= Córdoba, Spain =

City in Andalusia, Spain

Córdoba Cordova
- Municipality
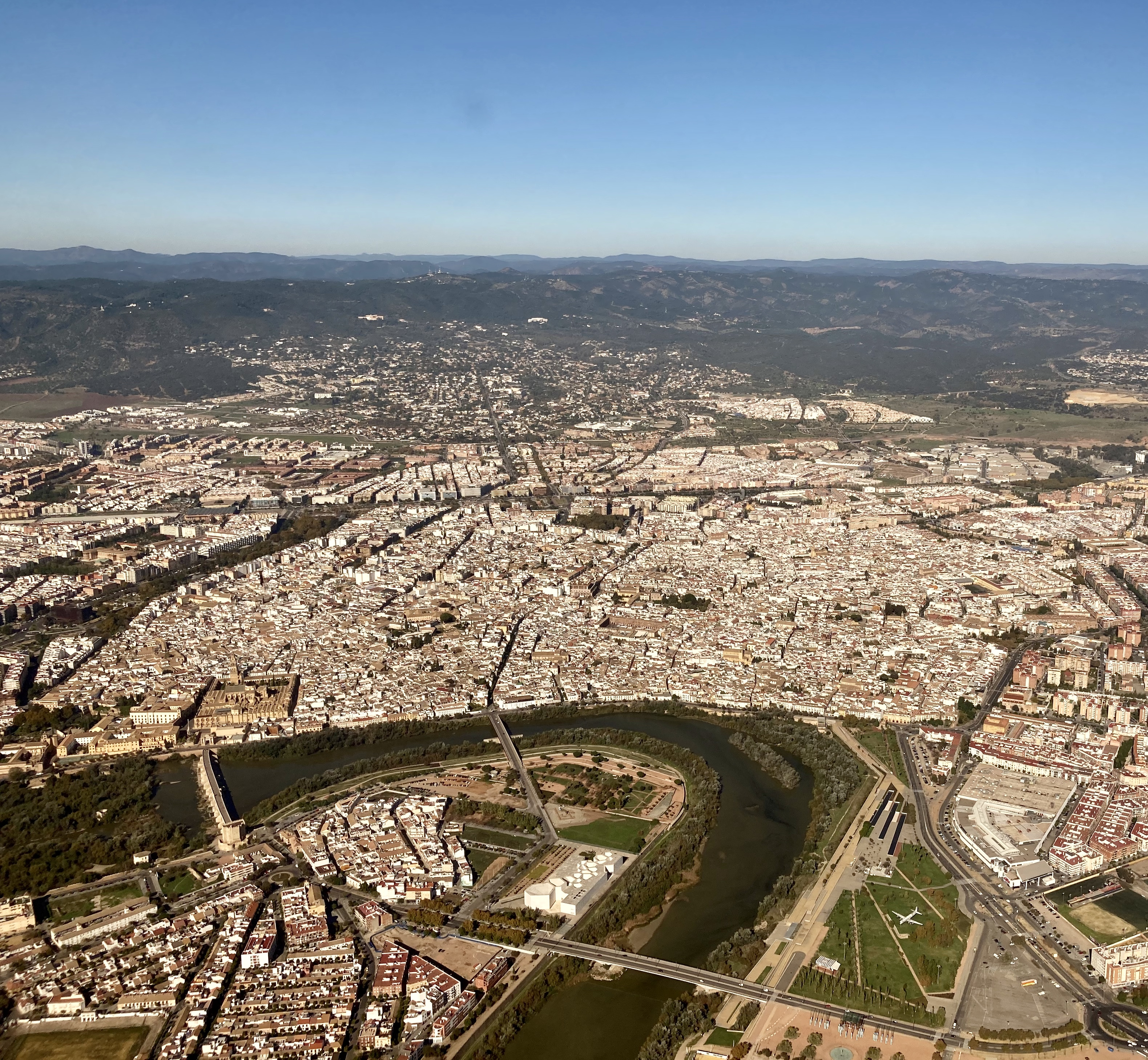
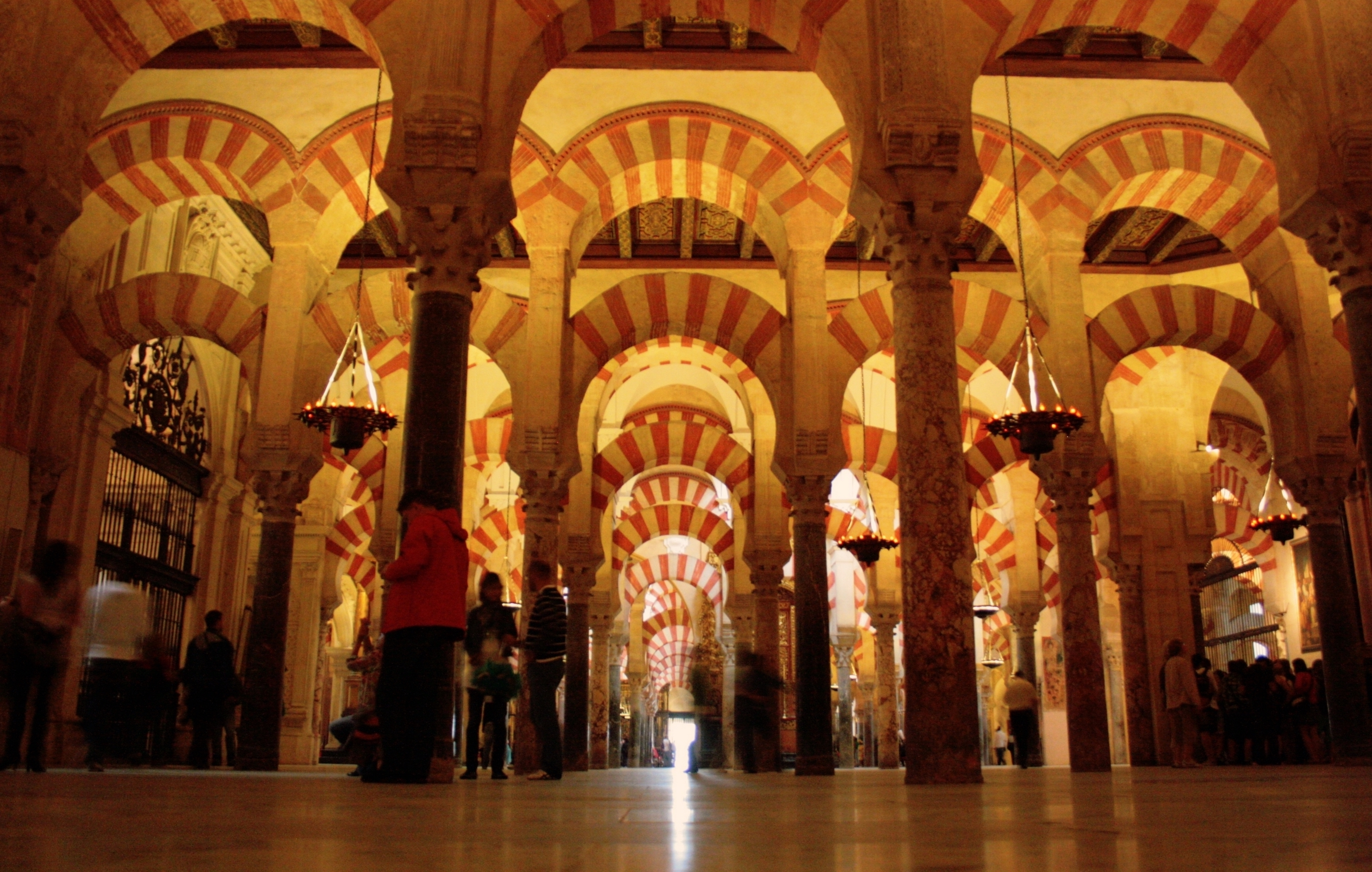
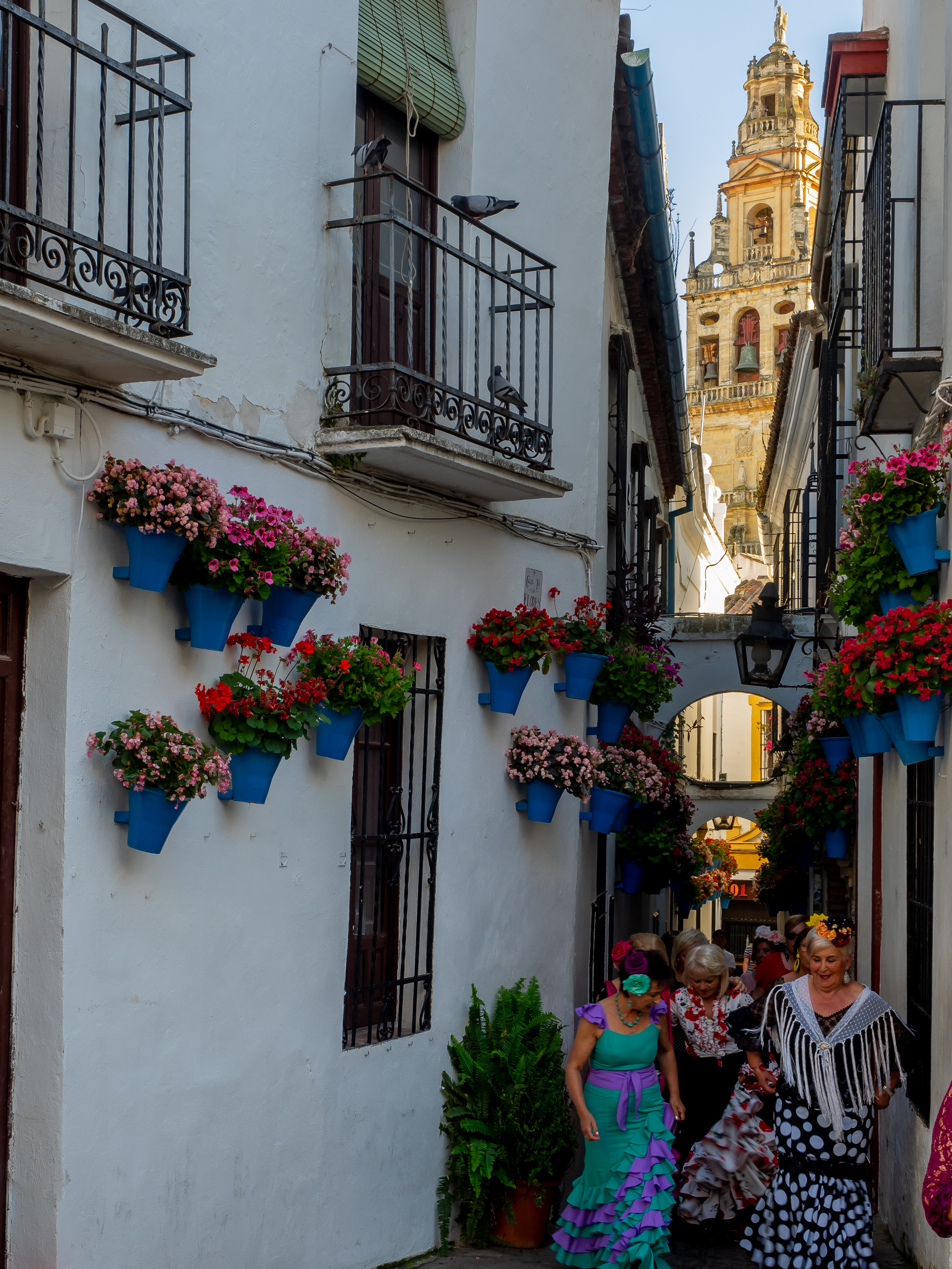
- View centred on the city's historic centre in relation to the Guadalquivir, with Sierra Morena in the background (November 2020) Mosque–Cathedral Calleja de las Flores

- Flag Seal
- Nicknames: La Ciudad Califal, Córdoba la Llana
- Location in Spain Córdoba (Andalusia)
- Coordinates: 37°53′24″N 4°46′48″W
- Country: Spain
- Autonomous community: Andalusia
- Province: Córdoba

Government
  - Type: Ayuntamiento
  - Body: Ayuntamiento de Córdoba
  - Mayor: José María Bellido (PP)

Area
  - Total: 1,253 km^{2} (484 sq mi)
- Elevation: 106 m (348 ft)

Population (2024)
  - Total: 324,902
  - Rank: 12th in Spain
  - Density: 259.3/km^{2} (671.6/sq mi)
- Demonyms: Cordoban, cordobés/sa, cordubense, cortubí, patriciense

GDP
  - Metro: €13.070 billion (2020)
- Time zone: UTC+1 (CET)
  - Summer (DST): UTC+2 (CEST)
- Postal code: 14001–14014
- Website: www.cordoba.es

UNESCO World Heritage Site
- Official name: Historic Centre of Cordoba
- Criteria: Cultural: i, ii, iii, iv
- Reference: 313
- Inscription: 1984 (8th Session)

Córdoba (/ˈkɔːrdəbə/ KOR-də-bə; Spanish: [ˈkoɾðoβa]), or sometimes Cordova (/ˈkɔːrdəvə/ KOR-də-və), is a city in Andalusia, Spain, and the capital of the province of Córdoba. With a population of 324,902 as of 2024, it is the 12th-largest city in Spain and the 3rd-largest in Andalusia.

The city primarily lies on the right bank of the Guadalquivir in the south of the Iberian Peninsula. Once a Roman colony, it was taken over by the Visigothic Kingdom in the sixth century and then conquered by the Muslims in the eighth century. Córdoba became the capital of the Emirate and then Caliphate of Córdoba, from which the Umayyad dynasty ruled al-Andalus. Under Umayyad rule, Córdoba was transformed into a centre of education and learning, and by the 10th century it had grown to be the second-largest city in Europe. The caliphate experienced a manifold political crisis in the early 11th century that brought about state collapse. Following the Christian conquest in 1236, Córdoba became part of the Crown of Castile as the head of the Kingdom of Córdoba.

Córdoba is the place with the most UNESCO World Heritage Sites in the world, with four separate UNESCO inscriptions. Córdoba is home to notable examples of Moorish architecture such as the Mezquita-Catedral, which was named as a UNESCO World Heritage Site in 1984 and is now a cathedral. The site has since been expanded to encompass the whole historic centre of Córdoba. Madinat al-Zahra near the city is also a World Heritage Site while the Festival de los Patios has been recognized as UNESCO Intangible Cultural Heritage.

Córdoba has the highest summer temperatures in Spain and Europe, with average high temperatures around 37 °C (99 °F) in July and August. Summers are very dry whereas the mild winters have frequent rainfall.

== Etymology ==
The name Córdoba has attracted fanciful explanations. One theory, suggested in 1799 by José Antonio Conde, is that the name comes from Punic qart ṭūbah 'good town'. C. F. Seybold and M. Ocaña Jiménez write, "The name is certainly not Semitic but Old Iberian." After the Roman conquest, the town's name was Latinised as Corduba. During the era of Muslim rule the city was known in Arabic as Qurṭubah (قرطبة).

== History ==
=== Prehistory, antiquity and Roman foundation of the city ===
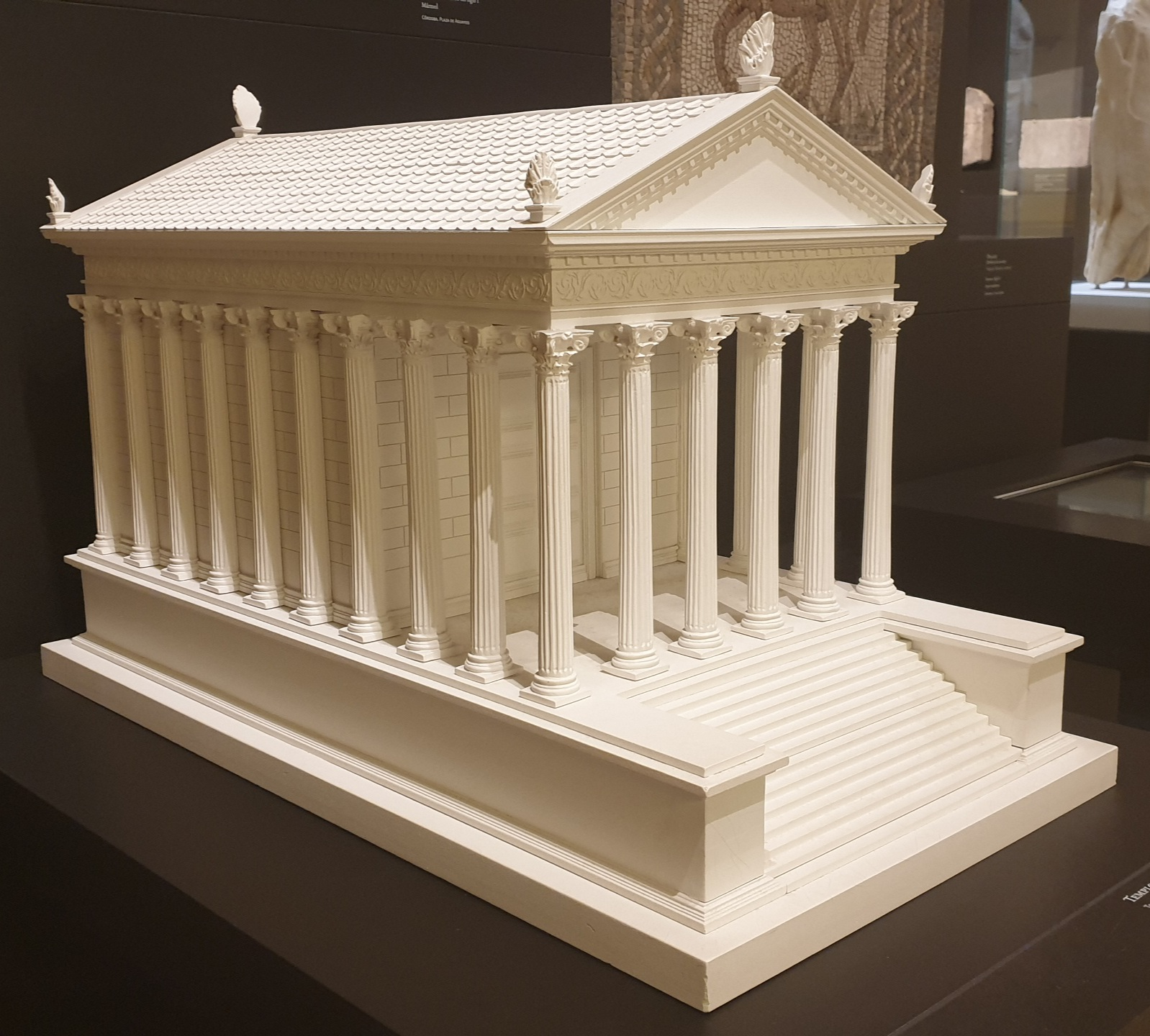
Reconstruction of the Roman temple of Córdoba

The first traces of human presence in the area are remains of a Neanderthal dating to c. 42,000 to 35,000 BC. Pre-urban settlements around the mouth of the Guadalquivir are known to have existed from the 8th century BC. The population gradually learned copper and silver metallurgy. The first historical mention of a settlement dates to the Carthaginian expansion across the Guadalquivir. Córdoba was conquered by the Romans in 206 BC.

In 169 BC, Roman consul Marcus Claudius Marcellus, the grandson of Marcus Claudius Marcellus, who had governed both Hispania Ulterior and Hispania Citerior respectively, founded a newer settlement alongside the pre-existing one. The date is contested; it could have been founded in 152 BC. Between 143 and 141 BC the town was besieged by Viriatus. A forum is known to have existed in the city in 113 BC. The famous Cordoba Treasure, with mixed local and Roman artistic traditions, was buried in the city at this time; it is now in the British Museum.

Corduba became a colonia with the name Colonia Patricia between 46 and 45 BC. It was sacked by Julius Caesar in 45 because of its fealty to Pompey and resettled with veteran soldiers by Augustus. It became the capital of Baetica, with a forum and numerous temples, and was the main center of Roman intellectual life in Hispania Ulterior. The Roman philosopher Seneca the Younger, his father, the orator Seneca the Elder, and his nephew, the poet Lucan came from Roman Córdoba.

In the late Roman period, Hosius of Corduba or "Bishop Ossius" was the dominant figure of the Latin Church throughout the earlier 4th century. Later, Corduba occupied an important place in the Provincia Hispaniae of the Byzantine Empire (552–572); the Visigoths conquered it in the late 6th century.

=== Umayyad rule ===
Córdoba was captured by the Muslims in 711 or 712. Unlike other Iberian towns, no capitulation was signed and the position was taken by storm. Córdoba was in turn governed by direct Arab rule. The new Umayyad commanders established themselves within the city and in 716 it became the provincial capital, subordinate to the Caliphate of Damascus, replacing Seville. In Arabic it was known as قرطبة (Qurṭuba).

The centre of the Roman and Visigothic cities became the walled medina. Over time, as many as 21 suburbs (رَبَض rabaḍ, pl. أَرْبَاض arbāḍ) developed around the city.

In 747, a battle took place in the surroundings of Córdoba, the Battle of Saqunda, pitting Arab Yemenites against northerner Qays.

Following the Abbasid ousting of the Umayyad Caliphate after 750, the surviving Umayyad Abd ar-Rahman crossed to the Iberian Peninsula in 756. He proclaimed himself Emir Abd ar-Rahman I and established his dynasty in Córdoba once the rump wāli Yusuf ibn Abd al-Rahman al-Fihri was defeated at a battle outside the city in May 756. In 785–786 (169 AH) he ordered construction of the Great Mosque of Córdoba, which was completed the next year and underwent later expansions under his successors.

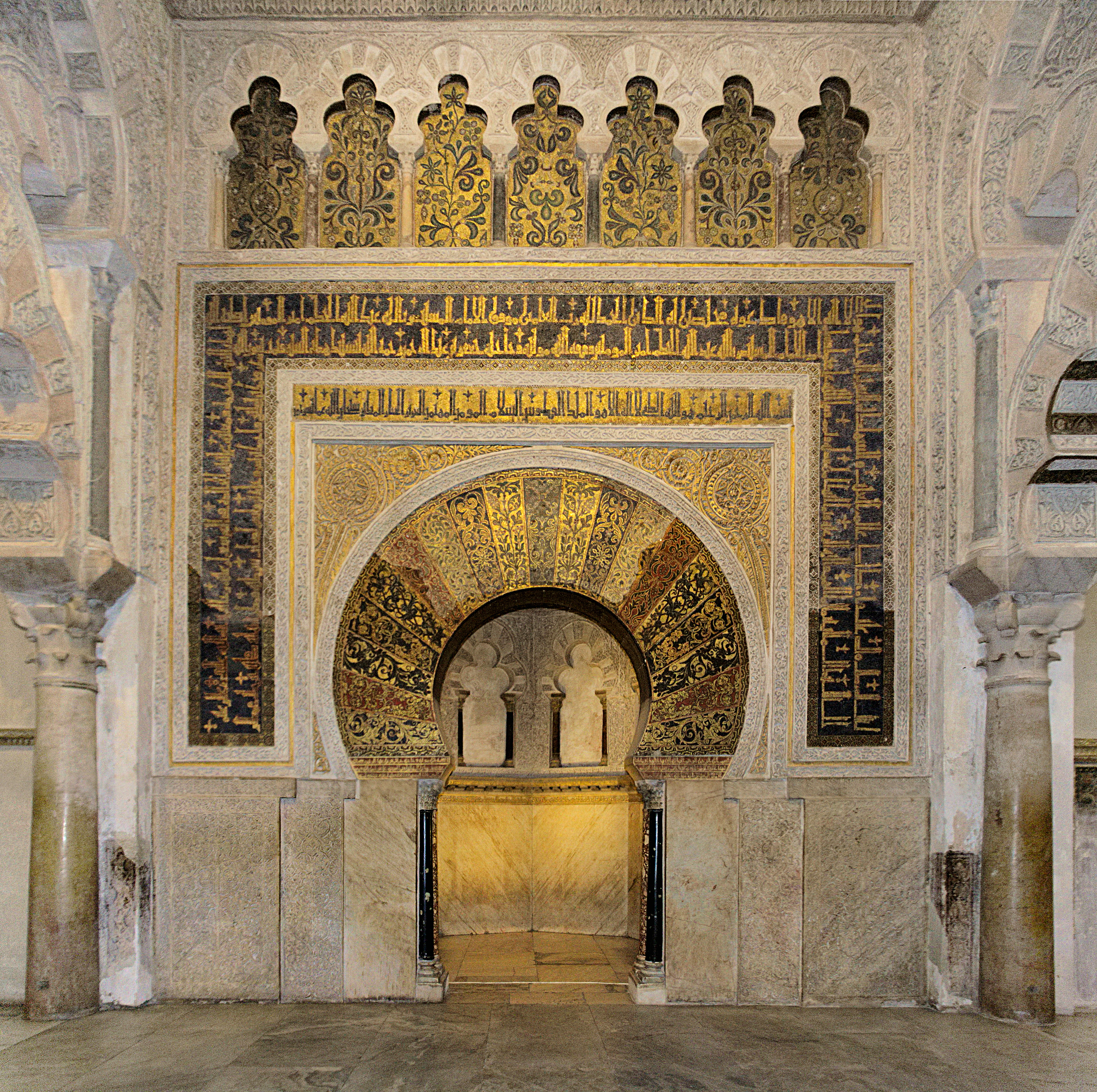
Mihrab of the Great Mosque

Historians' estimations of Córdoba's population during the 9th century range from 75,000 to 160,000. The ruthless repression of the 818 revolt in the southern suburb of Córdoba led to the destruction of the place. In the 10th and 11th centuries Córdoba was one of the most advanced cities in the world, and a great cultural, political, financial and economic centre.

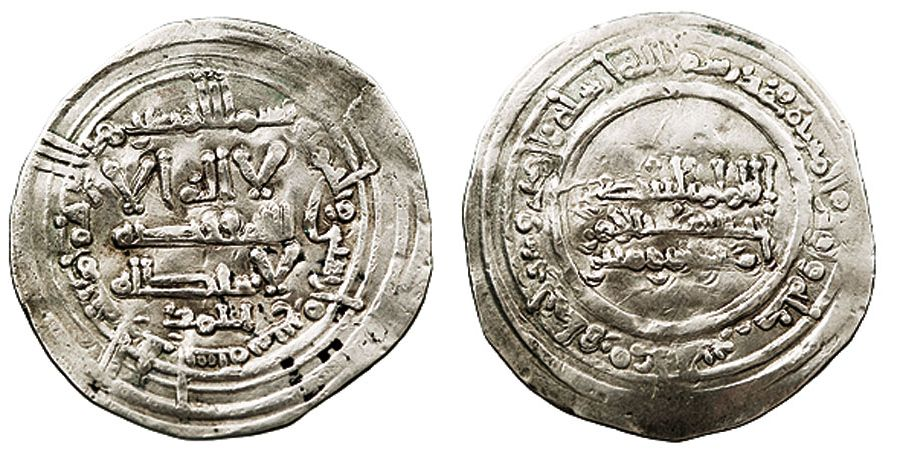
Dirham emitted by Abd al-Rahman III, coined in Medina Azahara (10th century)

Córdoba had a prosperous economy, with manufactured goods including leather, metal work, glazed tiles and textiles, and agricultural produce including a range of fruits, vegetables, herbs and spices, and materials such as cotton, flax and silk. It was also famous as a centre of learning, home to over 80 libraries and institutions of learning, with knowledge of medicine, mathematics, astronomy, botany far exceeding the rest of Europe at the time. Later, the vizier al-Mansur – the de facto ruler of al-Andalus from 976 to 1002 – burned most of the books on philosophy from the library of Caliph al-Hakam II to appease Maliki jurists (ulama); most of the others were sold off or perished in the civil strife not long after.

After a period of weak central rule, Abd ar-Rahman III came to power as emir in 912 and campaigned lengthily and systematically to re-establish the authority of Córdoba across Al-Andalus. In 929, after years of military and diplomatic efforts, he felt confident enough to declare himself "caliph", a title challenging the Abbasid caliphs in Baghdad and the Fatimid caliphs in North Africa. This inaugurated the height of Córdoba's power and influence in the 10th century. This century saw the construction of two palatine cities in the surroundings of Córdoba: Madīnat al-Zahrā to the west, built by Abd ar-Rahman III, and another one built later by al-Mansur (Medina Alzahira) to the east. Isa al-Razi describes Cordoba as "surrounded by many beautiful estates" and many varied fruit trees. The inner city of Cordoba was surrounded by 11 palaces, 22 almuna and 12 arbad (or suburbs), mainly on the right bank of the Guadalquivir, and in particular to the north and west of the city. Not much later, Ibn Bashkuwal lists a total of 21 suburbs (two to the south, three to the north, seven to the east and nine to the west). To the north, part of the rabad al-Rusafa was located just south of the present Parador of Arruzafa (or Parador of Cordoba), where excavations in the 1990s uncovered the remains of a variety of almuna, Roman villas and irrigation systems (with one aljibe of the early medieval period preserved in the basement of a private suburban house). The economic historian J. Bradford DeLong estimates the city's population at 400,000 around 1000 AD, while estimates from other historians range from 100,000 to 1,000,000 during the same era. Whatever Córdoba's population was, the city's apogee came to an abrupt halt after the 1009 crisis.

On 15 February 1009, with Hisham II as caliph and Abd al-Rahman Sanchuelo as hajib (and de facto ruler), a revolution broke out in Córdoba, which led to the proclamation of an alternative caliph. This marked the beginning of a long period of civil war and conflict in Al-Andalus known as the Fitna. Berbers entered and sacked Córdoba in May 1013. Hisham III was routed from Córdoba on 30 November 1031 and an oligarchic republic replaced the caliphate.

=== High and Late Middle Ages ===
Under rule of the Banu Yahwar, Cordobese power did not extend far from the city, as other independent polities emerged in the rest of the former caliphate. An estimation of 65,000 inhabitants has been proposed for 11th-century Córdoba.

In 1070, forces from the Abbadid Taifa of Seville entered Córdoba to help in the defence of the city, which had been besieged by al-Mamun of Toledo, ruler of Toledo, yet they took control and expelled the last ruler of the taifa of Córdoba, Abd-Al Malik, forcing him to exile. Al-Mamun did not cease in his efforts to take the city, and making use of a Sevillian renegade who murdered the Abbadid governor, he triumphantly entered the city on 15 February 1075, only to die there barely five months later, apparently poisoned. Córdoba was seized by force in March 1091 by the Almoravids. In 1121, the population revolted against the abuses of the Almoravid governor.

Sworn enemies of the Almoravid dynasty, the "Wolf King" Abū ʿAbd Allāh Muḥammad ibn Saʿd ibn Mardanīsh and his stepfather ibn Hamušk allied with Alfonso VIII of Castile and laid siege to Córdoba by 1158–1160, ravaging the surroundings but failing to take the city.

Almohad caliph Abdallah al-Adil appointed Al-Bayyasi (brother of Zayd Abu Zayd) as governor of Córdoba in 1224, only for the city to later become independent from Caliphal rule. Al-Bayyasi asked Ferdinand III of Castile for help and Córdoba revolted against him. Years later, in 1229, the city submitted to the authority of Ibn Hud, disavowing him in 1233, joining instead the territories under Muhammad Ibn al-Aḥmar, ruler of Arjona and soon-to-be emir of Granada.

Ferdinand III entered the city on 29 June 1236, following a siege of several months. According to Arab sources, Córdoba fell on 23 Shawwal 633 (that is, on 30 June 1236, a day later than Christian tradition). Upon the city's conquest the mosque was converted into a Catholic cathedral dedicated to the Virgin Mary (Santa Maria). This was also followed by the return to Santiago de Compostela of the church bells that had been looted by Almanzor and moved to Córdoba by Christian war prisoners in the late 10th century. Ferdinand III granted the city a fuero in 1241; it was based on the Liber Iudiciorum and in the customs of Toledo, yet formulated in an original way. Unlike the case of other kingdoms of the Crown of Castile, the wider Kingdom of Córdoba distinctly lacked realengo (royal demesne) council towns other than the capital city itself. In addition, the military orders had a comparatively lesser presence across the realm. The city was divided into 14 colaciones, and numerous new church buildings were added.

By the end of the 13th century, the land belonging to the council of Córdoba peaked at about 12,000 km^{2}. It progressively reduced upon creation of new lordships, amounting to about 9,000 km^{2} by the end of the middle ages.

The city's surrounding countryside was raided during the 1277–78 Marinid expedition in the Guadalquivir valley. In 1282, in the context of the problematic succession of Alfonso X of Castile, an army formed by the latter's supporters as well as Marinid forces laid siege to the city (where prince Sancho was) for 21 days. The city council had indeed joined a newly created brotherhood in 1282 together with other councils of the Upper Guadalquivir defending Sancho's dynastic rights against Alfonso's regal authoritarianism.

Many decades after during the Third Siege of Gibraltar in 1333, a diversionary army from Granada raided the countryside of Cordoba and encamped on the far side of the Roman Bridge of Cordoba. However the diversionary army had to return to Gibraltar to help their Marinid counterparts so no further action was taken. In 1368, during the Castilian Civil War, the city, loyal to the Trastámara side, was attacked by forces supporting of Peter I, with Granadan backing.

=== Modern history ===
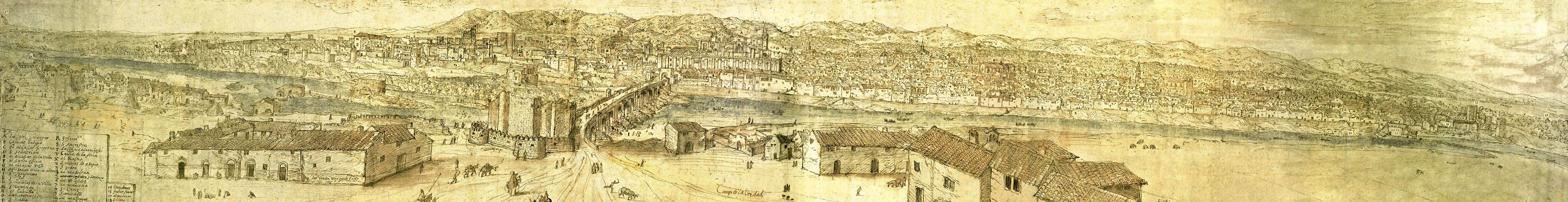
Panoramics of Córdoba as drawn by Anton van den Wyngaerde in 1567

In the context of the Early Modern Period, the city experienced a golden age between 1530 and 1580, profiting from an economic activity based on the trade of agricultural products and the preparation of clothes originally from Los Pedroches, peaking at a population of about 50,000 by 1571. A period of stagnation and ensuing decline followed.

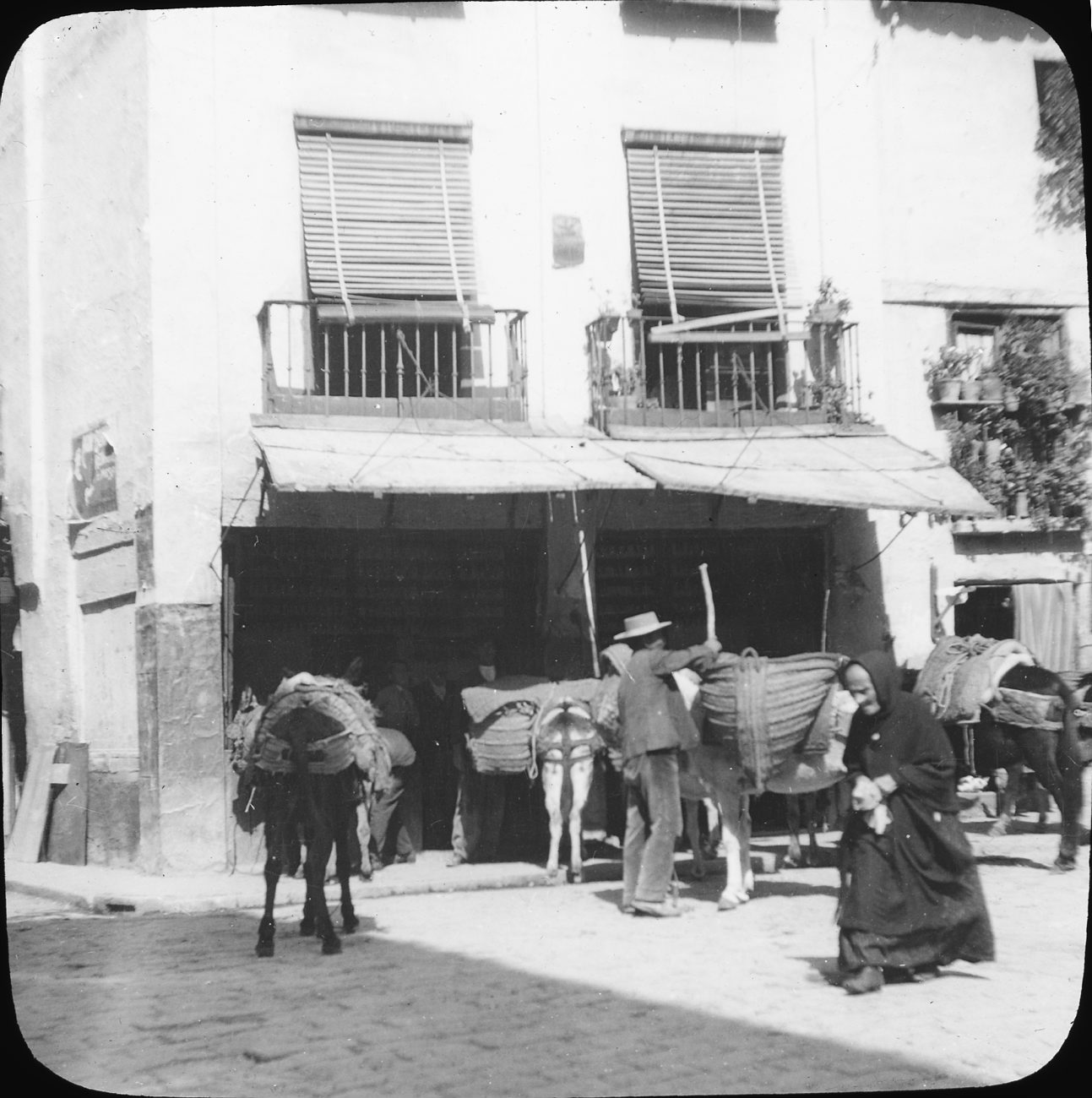
People in front of an inn in Córdoba (1910)

It was reduced to 20,000 inhabitants in the 18th century. The population and economy started to increase again only in the early 20th century. The second half of the 19th century saw the arrival of railway transport via the opening of the Seville–Córdoba line on 2 June 1859.

Córdoba was connected by railway to Jerez and Cádiz in 1861 and, in 1866, following the link with Manzanares, with Madrid. The city was eventually connected to Málaga and Belmez.

On 18 July 1936, the military governor of the province, Colonel Ciriaco Cascajo, launched the Nationalist coup in the city, bombing the civil government and arresting the civil governor, Rodríguez de León; these actions ignited the Spanish Civil War. Following the orders of the putschist General Queipo de Llano, he declared a state of war. The putschists were met by the resistance of the political and social representatives who had gathered in the civil government headquarters, and remained there until the Nationalist rifle fire and the presence of artillery broke their morale. When its defenders began fleeing the building, Rodríguez de León finally decided to surrender and was arrested.

In the following weeks, Queipo de Llano and Major Bruno Ibañez carried out a bloody repression in which 2,000 persons were executed. The ensuing Francoist repression in wartime and in the immediate post-war period (1936–1951) is estimated to have led to around 9,579 killings in the province.

The Mosque-Cathedral was declared a UNESCO World Heritage Site in 1984, and in 1994 this status was extended to the entire historic centre of Córdoba. The city has a number of modern areas, including the district of Zoco and the area surrounding the railway station.

The regional government (the Junta de Andalucía) has for some time been studying the creation of a Córdoba Metropolitan Area that would comprise, in addition to the capital itself, the towns of Villafranca de Córdoba, Obejo, La Carlota, Villaharta, Villaviciosa, Almodóvar del Río and Guadalcázar. The combined population of such an area would be around 351,000.

== Geography ==
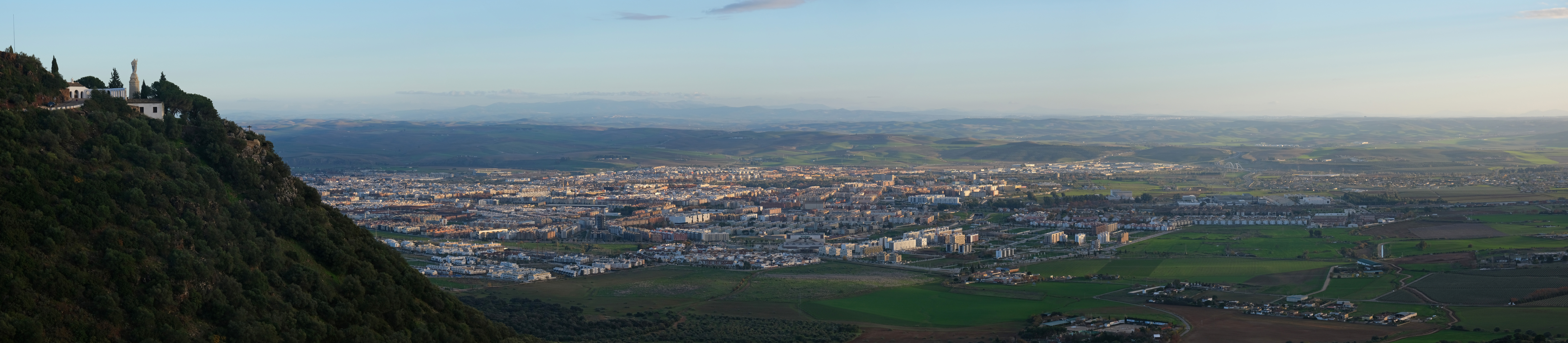
View of Córdoba from the Sierra foothills

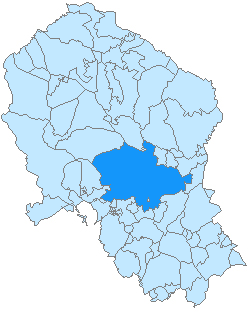
Location in the province of Córdoba

Córdoba is located in the south of the Iberian Peninsula, in the Guadalquivir depression formed by the Guadalquivir river, that cuts across the city in an east-north east to west-south west direction. The wider municipality extends across an area of 1,254.25 km^{2}, making it the largest municipality in Andalusia and the fourth largest in Spain.

The city of Córdoba lies in the middle course of the river. Three major landscape units in the municipality include the Sierra (as in the southern reaches of Sierra Morena), the Valley proper and the Campiña.

The differences in elevation in the Valley are very small, ranging from 100 and 170 metres above sea level, with the city proper located at an average altitude of roughly 125 metres above sea level. The landscape of the valley is further subdivided in the piedmont connecting with the Sierra, the fluvial terraces and the most immediate vicinity of the river course.

The Miocene Campiña, located in the southern bank of the Guadalquivir, features a hilly landscape gently increasing in height up to about 200 m. In the Sierra, to the north of the city, the altitude increases relatively abruptly up to 500 meters. Both the Sierra and the Campiña display viewpoints over the valley.

=== Climate ===
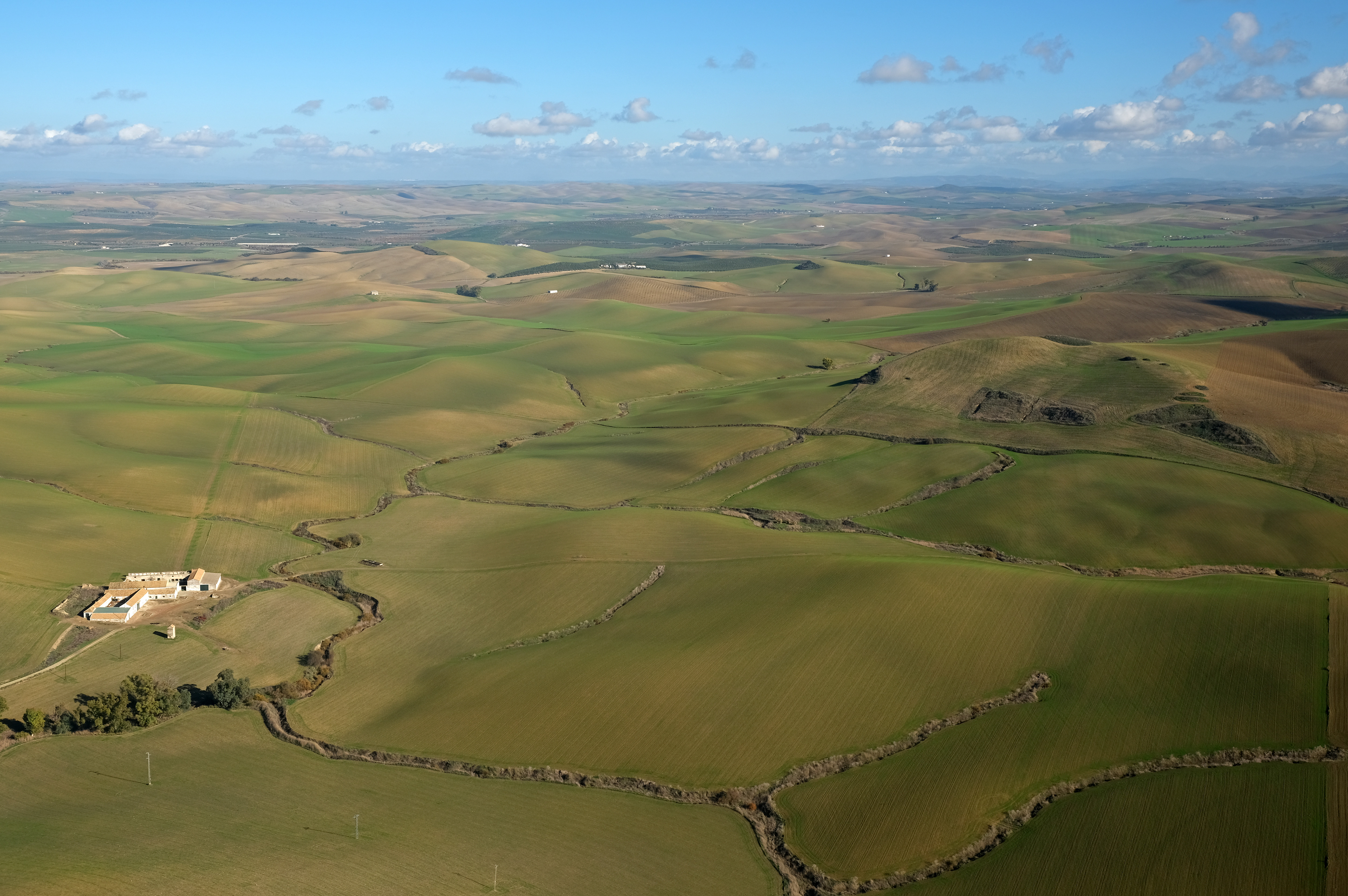
Green fields in Córdoba after December rains

Córdoba has a hot-summer Mediterranean climate (Köppen climate classification Csa). It has the highest summer average daily temperatures in Spain and Europe (with highs averaging 37 °C (99 °F) in July and August) and days with temperatures over 40 °C (104 °F) are common in the summer months. August's 24-hour average of 28.3 °C (83 °F) is also one of the highest in Europe. On average, Córdoba has 16 days with maximum temperatures over 40 °C (104 °F) and 68 days with maximum temperatures over 35 °C (95 °F). These scorching summers occur due to its location in the Guadalquivir Valley, which is considered to be the region with the hottest summer in Europe and even one of the hottest summers in the world that is not located in a semi-arid or arid region.

Winters are mild, yet cooler than other low lying cities in southern Spain due to its interior location, wedged between the Sierra Morena and the Penibaetic System. Precipitation is concentrated in the coldest months; this is due to the dry summer climate pattern featured in large parts of the Iberian Peninsula. Precipitation is generated by storms from the west that occur most frequently from December to February. This Atlantic characteristic then gives way to a hot summer with significant drought more typical of Mediterranean climates. Annual rain surpasses 550 mm (22 in), although it is recognized to vary from year to year.

In July 2022, there were 19 days with highs over 40 °C (104 °F) and 30 days with highs over 35 °C (95 °F), with the average high of 40.4 °C (104.7 °F) for that month, which is the highest ever recorded in the country and in Europe among all cities with a population over 100,000. On 27 April 2023, Córdoba broke the record for the highest maximum temperature recorded in peninsular Spain and Europe in a month of April, which registered 38.8 °C (101.8 °F). The registered maximum temperature at the Córdoba Airport, located at 6 km (4 mi) from the city, was 46.9 °C (116.4 °F) on 13 July 2017 and 14 August 2021. The lowest registered temperature was −8.2 °C (17.2 °F), on 28 January 2005.

Climate data for Córdoba Airport (1991–2020), extremes (1949–present)
Month	Jan	Feb	Mar	Apr	May	Jun	Jul	Aug	Sep	Oct	Nov	Dec	Year
Record high °C (°F)	23.5 (74.3)	27.8 (82.0)	33.0 (91.4)	38.8 (101.8)	41.2 (106.2)	45.0 (113.0)	46.9 (116.4)	46.9 (116.4)	45.4 (113.7)	37.6 (99.7)	29.7 (85.5)	23.8 (74.8)	46.9 (116.4)
Mean maximum °C (°F)	19.9 (67.8)	22.6 (72.7)	27.9 (82.2)	30.8 (87.4)	35.6 (96.1)	40.2 (104.4)	42.5 (108.5)	42.7 (108.9)	38.4 (101.1)	32.4 (90.3)	25.4 (77.7)	20.3 (68.5)	43.3 (109.9)
Mean daily maximum °C (°F)	15.2 (59.4)	17.4 (63.3)	21.1 (70.0)	23.6 (74.5)	28.1 (82.6)	33.4 (92.1)	37.1 (98.8)	37.0 (98.6)	31.8 (89.2)	25.8 (78.4)	19.1 (66.4)	15.8 (60.4)	25.5 (77.8)
Daily mean °C (°F)	9.4 (48.9)	11.1 (52.0)	14.2 (57.6)	16.6 (61.9)	20.5 (68.9)	25.1 (77.2)	28.2 (82.8)	28.3 (82.9)	24.4 (75.9)	19.4 (66.9)	13.5 (56.3)	10.5 (50.9)	18.4 (65.2)
Mean daily minimum °C (°F)	3.7 (38.7)	4.7 (40.5)	7.3 (45.1)	9.7 (49.5)	12.9 (55.2)	16.8 (62.2)	19.1 (66.4)	19.6 (67.3)	17.0 (62.6)	13.1 (55.6)	7.9 (46.2)	5.1 (41.2)	11.4 (52.5)
Mean minimum °C (°F)	−1.3 (29.7)	−0.5 (31.1)	1.4 (34.5)	4.9 (40.8)	7.4 (45.3)	12.2 (54.0)	15.0 (59.0)	15.3 (59.5)	12.2 (54.0)	7.4 (45.3)	1.7 (35.1)	−0.8 (30.6)	−2.7 (27.1)
Record low °C (°F)	−8.2 (17.2)	−5.0 (23.0)	−4.2 (24.4)	0.2 (32.4)	2.4 (36.3)	7.0 (44.6)	11.0 (51.8)	11.0 (51.8)	6.0 (42.8)	1.0 (33.8)	−3.6 (25.5)	−7.8 (18.0)	−8.2 (17.2)
Average precipitation mm (inches)	57.6 (2.27)	52.7 (2.07)	62.5 (2.46)	54.3 (2.14)	42.4 (1.67)	11.0 (0.43)	0.5 (0.02)	6.7 (0.26)	36.6 (1.44)	78.7 (3.10)	79.2 (3.12)	90.7 (3.57)	572.9 (22.55)
Average precipitation days (≥ 1 mm)	6.9	5.9	6.2	6.4	4.9	1.2	0.2	0.6	3.0	6.5	6.5	6.8	55.1
Average relative humidity (%)	76	70	64	59	51	43	38	39	50	63	73	78	59
Mean monthly sunshine hours	174	187	217	246	298	336	372	344	255	220	180	161	2,990
Percentage possible sunshine	57	61	58	62	67	76	83	82	68	63	59	54	66
Average ultraviolet index	2	3	5	7	8	9	9	9	7	5	3	2	6
Source: Agencia Estatal de Meteorologia (AEMET OpenData) and Weather Atlas (uv index)

Climate data for Córdoba Airport (altitude 90m, 1981–2010 normals)
Month	Jan	Feb	Mar	Apr	May	Jun	Jul	Aug	Sep	Oct	Nov	Dec	Year
Mean daily maximum °C (°F)	14.9 (58.8)	17.4 (63.3)	21.3 (70.3)	22.8 (73.0)	27.4 (81.3)	32.8 (91.0)	36.9 (98.4)	36.5 (97.7)	31.6 (88.9)	25.1 (77.2)	19.1 (66.4)	15.3 (59.5)	25.1 (77.2)
Daily mean °C (°F)	9.3 (48.7)	11.1 (52.0)	14.4 (57.9)	16.0 (60.8)	20.0 (68.0)	24.7 (76.5)	28.0 (82.4)	28.0 (82.4)	24.2 (75.6)	19.1 (66.4)	13.5 (56.3)	10.4 (50.7)	18.2 (64.8)
Mean daily minimum °C (°F)	3.6 (38.5)	4.9 (40.8)	7.4 (45.3)	9.3 (48.7)	12.6 (54.7)	16.5 (61.7)	19.0 (66.2)	19.4 (66.9)	16.9 (62.4)	13.0 (55.4)	7.8 (46.0)	5.5 (41.9)	11.3 (52.4)
Average precipitation mm (inches)	66 (2.6)	55 (2.2)	49 (1.9)	55 (2.2)	40 (1.6)	13 (0.5)	2 (0.1)	5 (0.2)	35 (1.4)	86 (3.4)	80 (3.1)	111 (4.4)	597 (23.6)
Average precipitation days (≥ 1 mm)	7.2	6.1	4.9	6.7	4.9	1.4	0.4	0.6	3.2	6.9	5.9	8.1	56.3
Average snowy days	0.2	0	0	0	0	0	0	0	0	0	0	0	0.2
Average relative humidity (%)	76	71	64	60	55	48	41	43	52	66	73	79	60
Mean monthly sunshine hours	174	186	218	235	289	323	363	336	248	205	180	148	2,905
Source: Agencia Estatal de Meteorología (AEMET)

== Demographics ==
Historical population
Year	Pop.	±%
1842	42,092	—
1857	42,909	+1.9%
1877	47,864	+11.5%
1887	54,448	+13.8%
1900	56,097	+3.0%
1910	64,407	+14.8%
1920	72,641	+12.8%
1930	101,701	+40.0%
1940	135,674	+33.4%
1950	160,347	+18.2%
1960	189,671	+18.3%
1970	232,343	+22.5%
1981	279,386	+20.2%
1991	302,154	+8.1%
2001	308,072	+2.0%
2011	328,326	+6.6%
2021	322,327	−1.8%
Source: INE

As of 2024, the foreign-born population of the city is 19,432, equal to 6.0% of the total population.

Foreign population by country of birth (2024)
Nationality	Population
Colombia	1,925
Morocco	1,708
Ecuador	1,522
Venezuela	1,187
Nicaragua	867
Honduras	825
Romania	777
Paraguay	765
France	737
Germany	677
China	617
Argentina	495
Peru	440
Bolivia	418
Cuba	410

== Landmarks ==
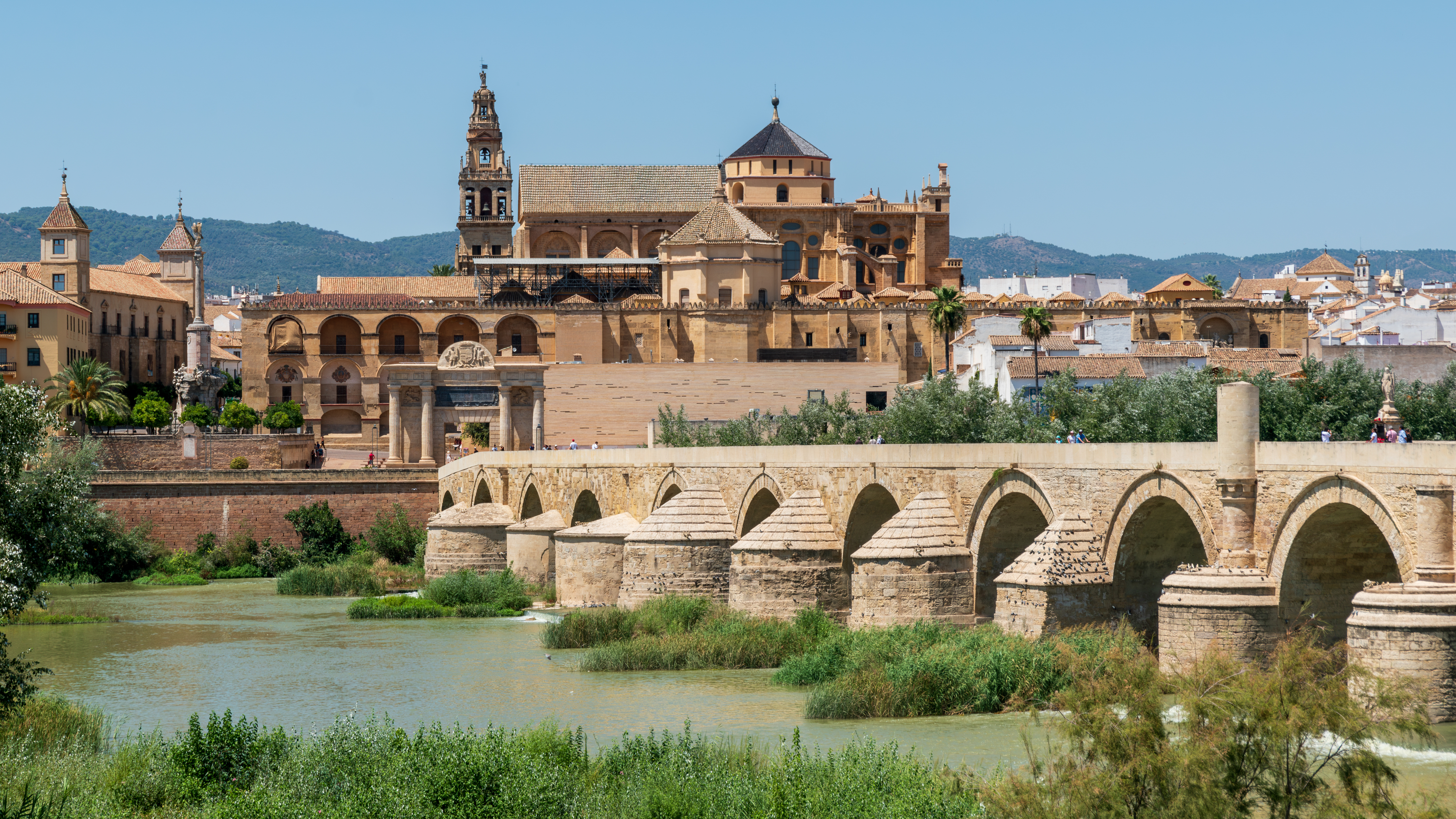
View of the historic centre of Córdoba from the Guadalquivir River

The historic centre of Córdoba has been a UNESCO World Heritage Site since 1994. (Note: The Mosque-Cathedral was listed as a World Heritage Site first in 1984 and this designation was extended to the rest of the historic centre in 1994.)

=== Roman ===
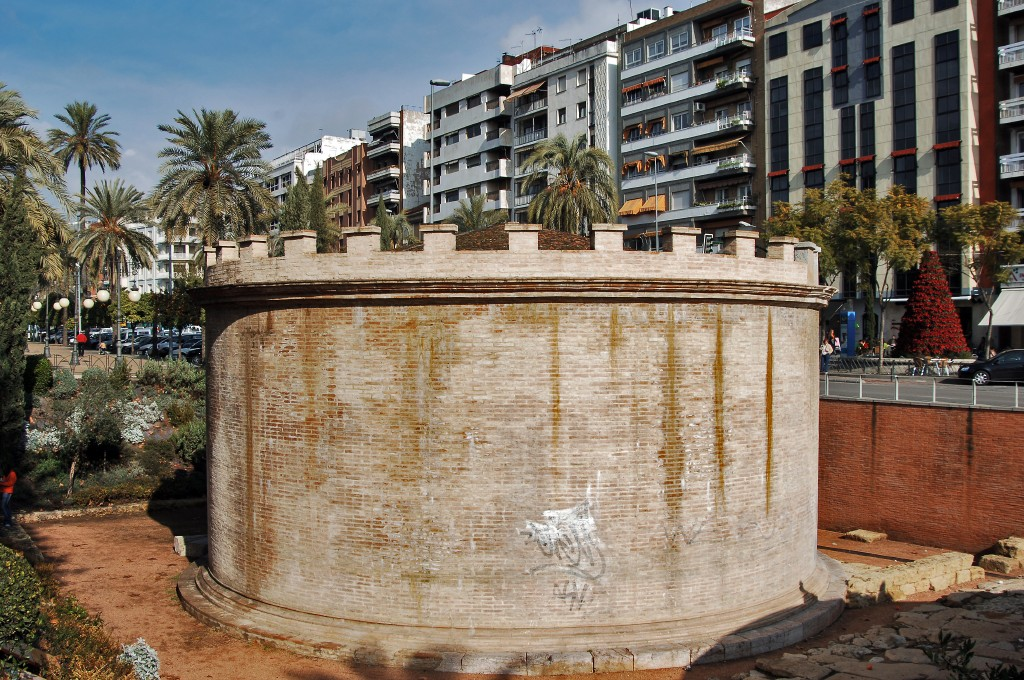
Roman Mausoleum in the Paseo de la Victoria

The Roman Bridge, over the Guadalquivir River, links the area of Campo de la Verdad with Barrio de la Catedral. It was the only bridge of the city for twenty centuries, until the construction of the San Rafael Bridge in the mid-20th century. It was initially built in the early 1st century BC during the reign of emperor Augustus but significantly rebuilt in the 8th century under Umayyad rule. It has a length of about 250 m and has 16 arches.

Other Roman remains include the Roman Temple, the Theatre, Mausoleum, the Colonial Forum, the Forum Adiectum, an amphitheater and the remains of the Palace of Emperor Maximian in the archaeological site of Cercadilla.

=== Islamic ===
==== Great Mosque of Córdoba ====
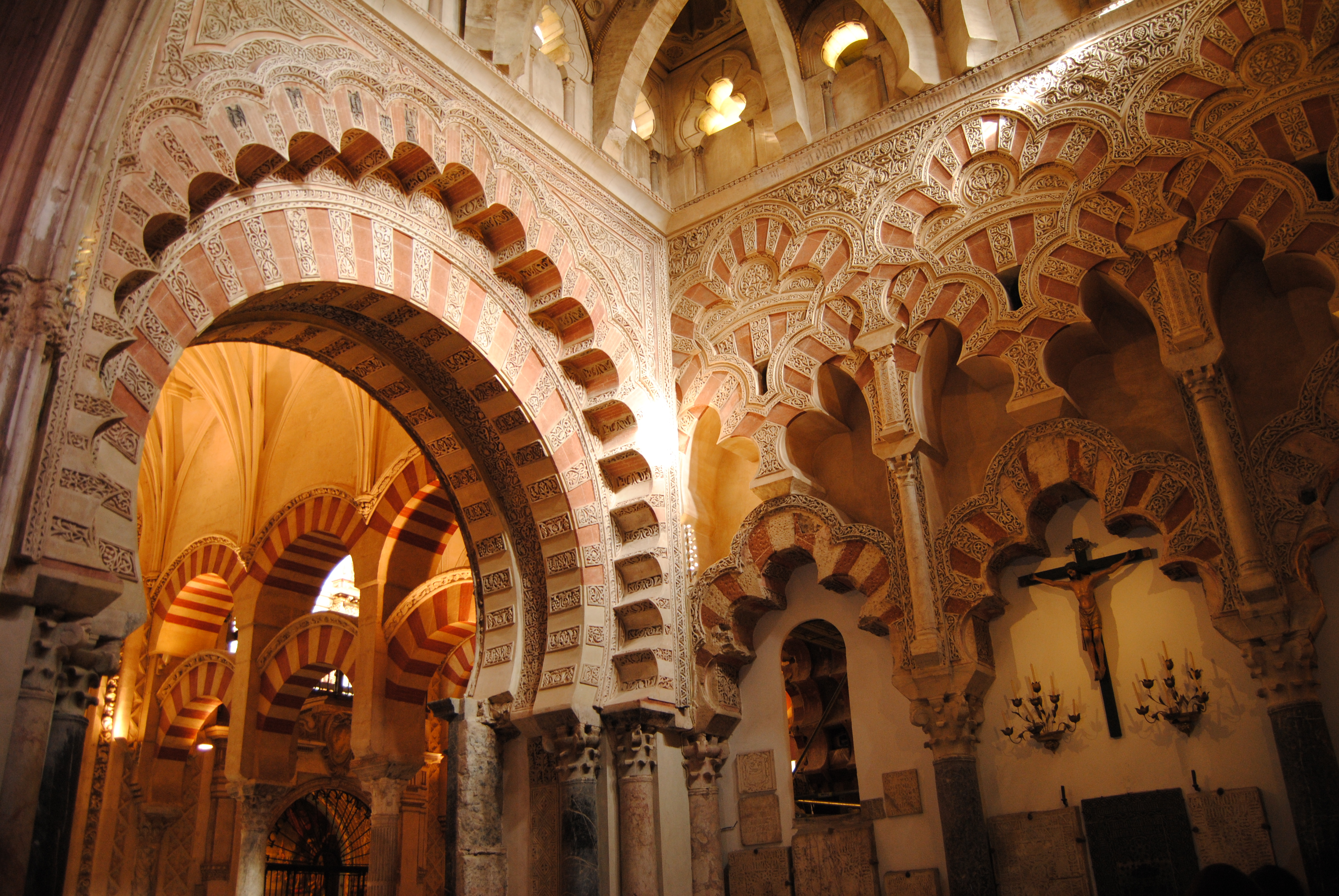
Interior of the Mosque–Cathedral of Córdoba

From 784- 786 AD, Abd al-Rahman I built the Great Mosque of Córdoba, one of the most famous monuments of Western Islamic (Moorish) architecture and for centuries the third largest mosque in the world. It integrated aspects of Islamic architecture with some indigenous elements of Roman and Visigothic architecture. Later Umayyad rulers expanded the mosque, adding a minaret and extending the prayer hall. A major 10th-century expansion resulted in the elaborate mihrab and other ornate embellishments seen today. After the Christian conquest of the city the mosque was converted to a cathedral. It underwent significant modifications in the 16th century but much of the original structure remains. The building was listed as a World Heritage Site in 1984.

==== Minaret of San Juan ====
Built in 930 AD, the mosque that this minaret adorned has been replaced by a church and the minaret re-purposed as a tower. It retains characteristics of Islamic architecture in the region, including a double horseshoe-arch windows.

==== Mills of the Guadalquivir ====
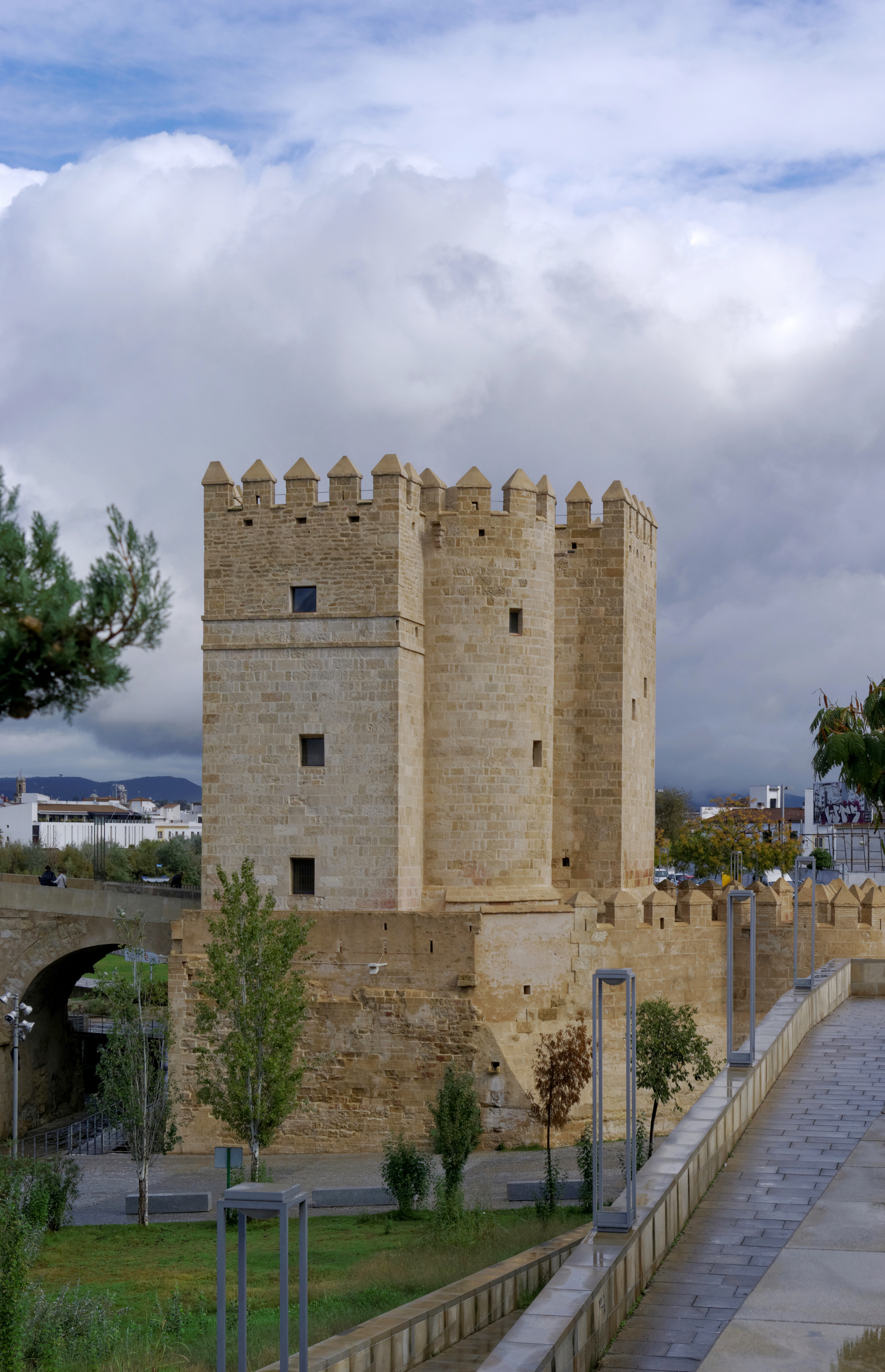
The Tower of Calahorra to one side of the Roman Bridge

Along the banks of the Guadalquivir are the Mills of the Guadalquivir, an array of watermills from different periods that used the power of the water current to grind flour. They include the Albolafia, Alegría watermill, Carbonell, Casillas, Enmedio, Lope García, Martos, Pápalo, San Antonio, San Lorenzo and San Rafael mills.

==== Calahorra Tower ====
The Calahorra is a fortified tower standing at the southern end of the city's Roman Bridge. Its original construction is attributed to the Almohad period. It now houses the Al-Andalus Living Museum (Museo Vivo de Al-Andalus), a museum on the cultural achievements of Al-Andalus.

==== Caliphal Baths ====
Near the Alcázar de los Reyes Cristianos, on the site of the former Islamic-era Alcázar, are the Caliphal Baths, a partly reconstructed hammam (baths) complex created in the 10th century and subsequently expanded. The archeological site has been open as a museum since 2006.

==== Medina Azahara ====
On the outskirts of the city lies the archaeological site of Madinat al-Zahra, the 10th-century palace-city. It is another major example of Islamic architecture in Spain and has been undergoing excavation and reconstruction since 1911.

=== Jewish Quarter ===
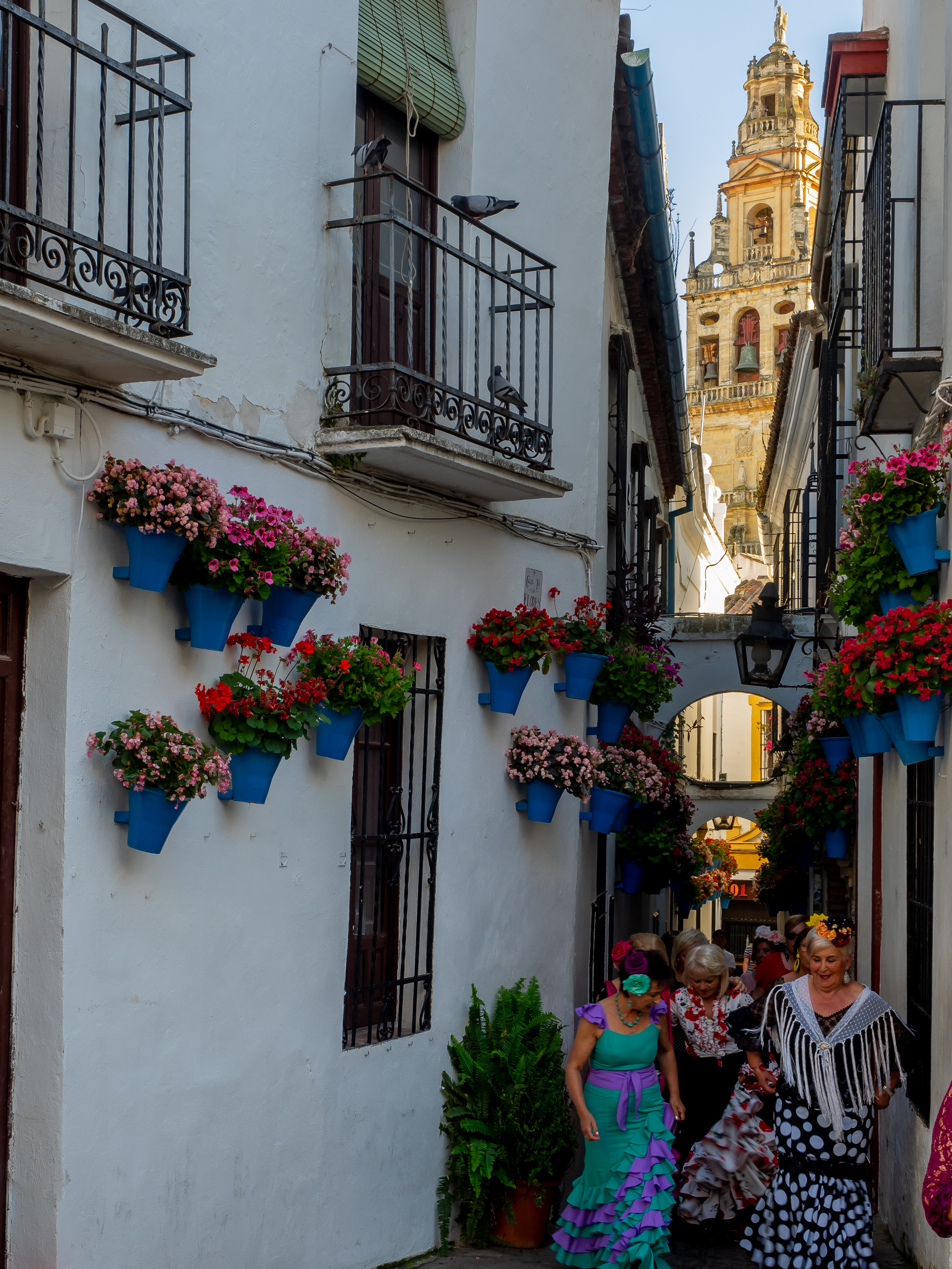
Calleja de las Flores, with the Great Cathedral in the background

Near the cathedral is the old Jewish quarter, which consists of many irregular streets that preserve some of the city's medieval aspect. It contains a museum, the Sepharad House, and the Synagogue, built in 1315.

=== Christian ===
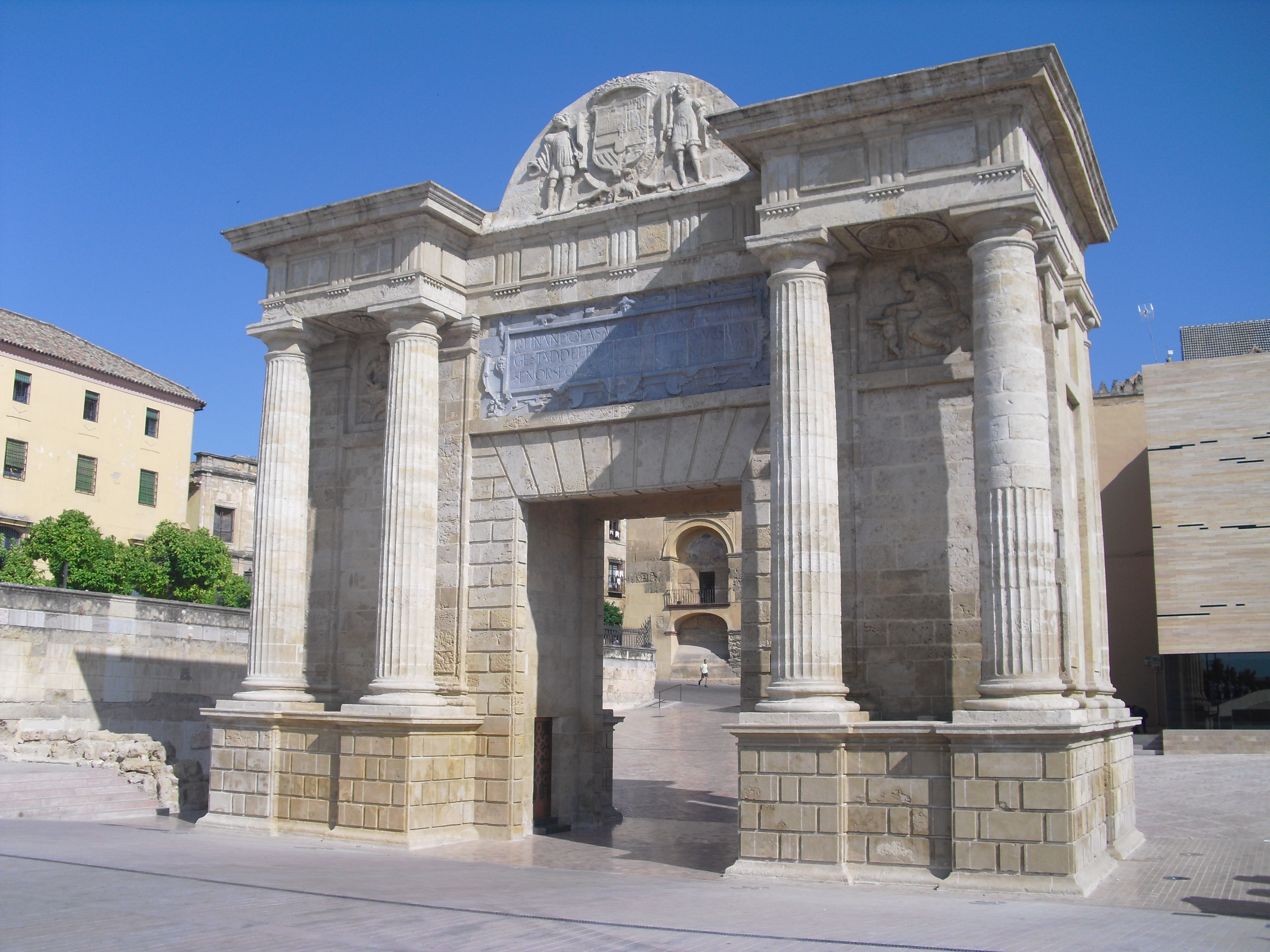
Puerta del Puente

Surrounding the large Old town are the Roman walls: gates include the Puerta de Almodóvar, the Puerta de Sevilla and Puerta del Puente, which are the only three gates remaining from the original thirteen. Towers and fortresses include the Malmuerta Tower, Torre de Belén and the Puerta del Rincón's Tower.

In the south of the Old town and east of the great cathedral, in the Plaza del Potro, is the Posada del Potro, a row of inns mentioned in literary works including Don Quixote and La Feria de los Discretos, and which remained active until 1972. Both the plaza and the inn get their name from the fountain in the centre of the plaza, which represents a foal (potro). Not far from this plaza is the Arco del Portillo (a 14th-century arch). In the extreme southwest of the Old Town is the Alcázar de los Reyes Cristianos, a former royal property and the seat of the Inquisition; adjacent to it are the Royal Stables, where Andalusian horses are bred. Palace buildings in the Old Town include the Palacio de Viana (14th century) and the Palacio de la Merced among others. Other sights include the Cuesta del Bailío (a staircase connecting the upper and lower part of the city).

==== Fernandine churches ====
The city is home to 12 Christian churches that were built (many as transformations of mosques) by Ferdinand III of Castile after the reconquest of the city in the 13th century. They were to act both as churches and as the administrative centres in the neighborhoods into which the city was divided in medieval times. Some of those that remain are:

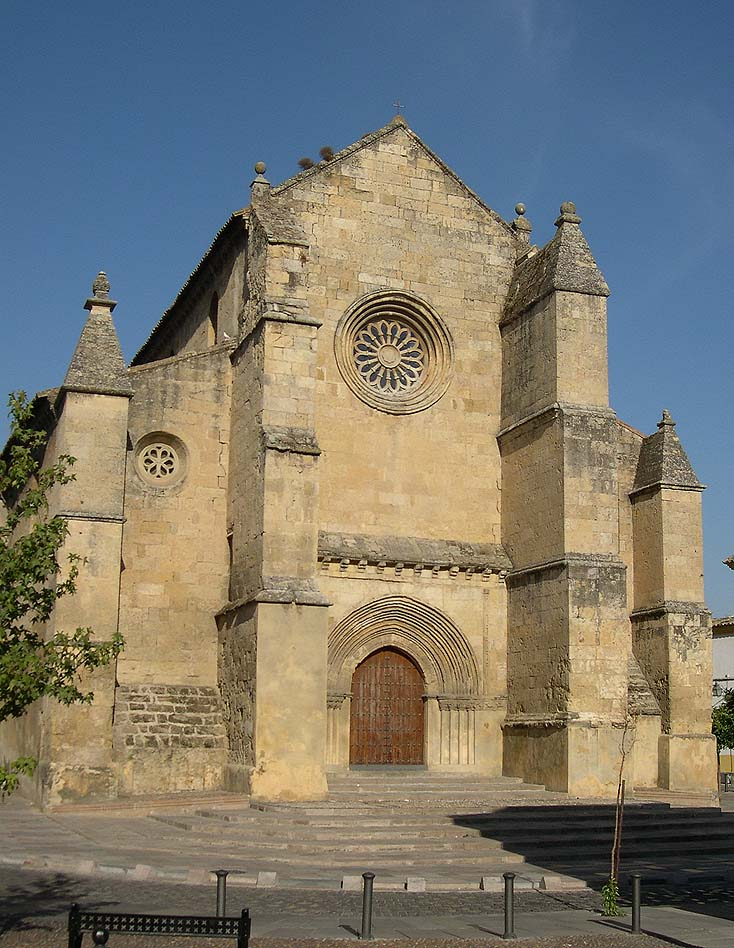
Iglesia de Santa Marina de Aguas Santas, built in the 13th century

- San Nicolás de la Villa.
- San Miguel.
- San Juan y Todos los Santos (also known as Iglesia de la Trinidad).
- Santa Marina de Aguas Santas.
- San Agustín. Begun in 1328, it has now an 18th-century appearance. The façade bell tower, with four bells, dates to the 16th century.
- San Andrés, largely renovated in the 14th and 15th centuries. It has a Renaissance portal (1489) and a bell tower from the same period, while the high altar is a Baroque work by Pedro Duque Cornejo.
- San Lorenzo.
- Church of Santiago.
- San Pedro.
- Santa María Magdalena. Like the others, it combines Romanesque, Mudéjar and Gothic elements.
- San Pablo. In the church's garden in the 1990s the ruins of an ancient Roman circus were discovered.

==== Other religious structures ====
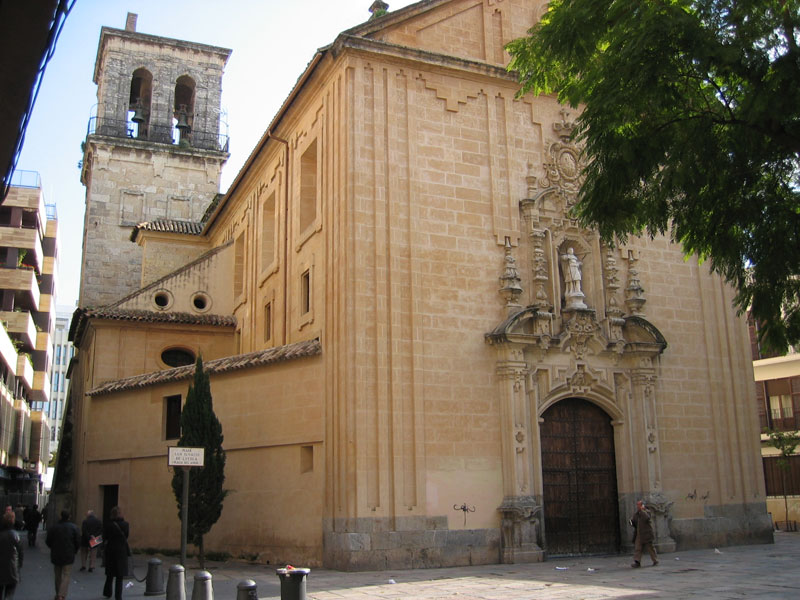
Main façade of the Iglesia de San Hipólito

- Iglesia de San Hipólito. It houses the tombs of Ferdinand IV and Alfonso XI of Castile, kings of Castile and León.
- Iglesia de San Francisco
- Iglesia de San Salvador y Santo Domingo de Silos
- Santuario de Nuestra Señora de Linares
- Torre de Santo Domingo de Silos
- Santuario de Nuestra Señora de la Fuensanta
- Chapel of San Bartolomé
- Convent of Santa Clara
- Convent of Santa Cruz
- Convent of Santa Marta

==== Sculptures and memorials ====
Scattered throughout the city are ten statues of the Archangel Raphael, protector and custodian of the city. These are called the Triumphs of Saint Raphael, and are located in landmarks such as the Roman Bridge, the Puerta del Puente and the Plaza del Potro.

In the western part of the Historic Centre are the statue of Seneca (near the Puerta de Almodóvar, a gate from the time of Islamic rule, (the Statue of Averroes (next to the Puerta de la Luna), and Maimonides (in the plaza de Tiberiades). Further south, near the Puerta de Sevilla, are the sculpture to the poet Ibn Zaydún and the sculpture of the writer and poet Ibn Hazm and, inside the Alcázar de los Reyes Cristianos, the monument to the Catholic Monarchs and Christopher Columbus.

There are also several sculptures in plazas of the Old Town. In the central Plaza de las Tendillas is the equestrian statue of Gonzalo Fernández de Córdoba, in the Plaza de Capuchinos is the Cristo de los Faroles, in Plaza de la Trinidad is the statue of Luis de Góngora, in the Plaza del Cardenal Salazar is the bust of Ahmad ibn Muhammad abu Yafar al-Gafiqi, in the Plaza de Capuchinas is the statue to the bishop Osio, in Plaza del Conde de Priego is the monument to Manolete and the Campo Santo de los Mártires is a statue to Al-Hakam II and the monument to the lovers.

In the Jardines de la Agricultura is the monument to the painter Julio Romero de Torres, a bust by sculptor Mateo Inurria, a bust of the poet Julio Aumente and the sculpture dedicated to the gardener Aniceto García Roldán, who was killed in the park. Further south, in the Gardens of the Duke of Rivas, is a statue of writer and poet Ángel de Saavedra, 3rd Duke of Rivas by sculptor Mariano Benlliure.

In the Guadalquivir river, near the San Rafael Bridge is the Island of the sculptures, an artificial island with a dozen stone sculptures executed during the International Sculpture Symposium. Up the river, near the Miraflores bridge, is the "Hombre Río", a sculpture of a swimmer looking to the sky and whose orientation varies depending on the current.

==== Bridges ====
- San Rafael Bridge, consisting of eight arches of 25 m span and a length of 217 m. The width is between parapets, divided into 12 m of cobblestone for four circulations and two tiled concrete sidewalks. It was inaugurated on 29 April 1953 joining the Avenue Corregidor with Plaza de Andalucía. In January 2004 the plaques reading "His Excellency the Head of State and Generalissimo of all the Armies, Francisco Franco Bahamonde, opened this bridge of the Guadalquivir on 29 April 1953", which were on both sides of each of the entrances of the bridge, were removed.
- Andalusia Bridge, a suspension bridge.
- Puente de Miraflores, known as "the rusty bridge". This bridge links the Street San Fernando and Ronda de Isasa with the Miraflores peninsula. It was designed by Herrero, Suárez and Casado and inaugurated on 2 May 2003. At first, in 1989, a proposal by architect-engineer Santiago Calatrava was considered that would look like the Lusitania Bridge of Mérida, but this was eventually discarded because its height would obscure the view of the Great Mosque.
- Autovía del Sur Bridge.
- Abbas Ibn Firnas Bridge, inaugurated in January 2011. It is part of the variant west of Córdoba.
- Puente del Arenal, connecting Avenue Campo de la Verdad with the Recinto Ferial (fairground) of Córdoba.

=== Gardens, parks and natural environments ===
- Jardines de la Victoria. Within the gardens there are two newly renovated facilities, the old Caseta del Círculo de la Amistad, today Caseta Victoria, and the Kiosko de la música, as well as a small Modernist fountain from the early 20th century. The northern section, called Jardines of Duque de Rivas, features a pergola of neoclassical style, designed by the architect Carlos Sáenz de Santamaría; it is used as an exhibition hall and a café bar.
- Jardines de la Agricultura, located between the Jardines de la Victoria and the Paseo de Córdoba: it includes numerous trails that radially converge to a round square which has a fountain or pond. This is known as the duck pond, and, in the centre, has an island with a small building in which these animals live. Scattered throughout the garden are numerous sculptures such as the sculpture in memory of Julio Romero de Torres, the sculpture to the composer Julio Aumente and the bust of Mateo Inurria. In the north is a rose garden in form of a labyrinth.
- Parque de Miraflores, located on the south bank of the river Guadalquivir. It was designed by the architect Juan Cuenca Montilla as a series of terraces. Among other points of interest as the Salam and Miraflores Bridge and a sculpture by Agustín Ibarrola.
- Parque Cruz Conde, located southwest of the city, is an open park and barrier-free park in English gardens style.
- Paseo de Córdoba. Located on the underground train tracks, it is a long tour of several km in length with more than 434,000 m^{2}. The tour has numerous fountains, including six formed by a portico of falling water which form a waterfall to a pond with four levels. Integrated into the tour is a pond of water from the Roman era, and the building of the old train station of RENFE, now converted into offices of Canal Sur.
- Jardines Juan Carlos I, in the Ciudad Jardín neighborhood. It is a fortress which occupies an area of about 12,500 square metres.
- Jardines del Conde de Vallellano, located on both sides of the avenue of the same name. It includes a large L-shaped pond with a capacity of 3,000 m^{3} (105,944.00 cu ft) and archaeological remains embedded in the gardens, among which is a Roman cistern from the second half of the 1st century BC.
- Parque de la Asomadilla, with a surface of 27 hectares, is the second largest park in Andalusia. The park recreates a Mediterranean forest vegetation, such as hawthorn, pomegranate, hackberry, oak, olive, tamarisk, cypress, elms, pines, oaks and carob trees among others.
- Balcón del Guadalquivir.
- Jardines de Colón.
- Sotos de la Albolafia. Declared Natural monument by the Andalusian Autonomous Government, it is located in a stretch of the Guadalquivir river from the Roman Bridge and the San Rafael Bridge, with an area of 21.36 hectares. Host a large variety of birds and is an important point of migration for many birds.
- Parque periurbano Los Villares.

== Museums ==
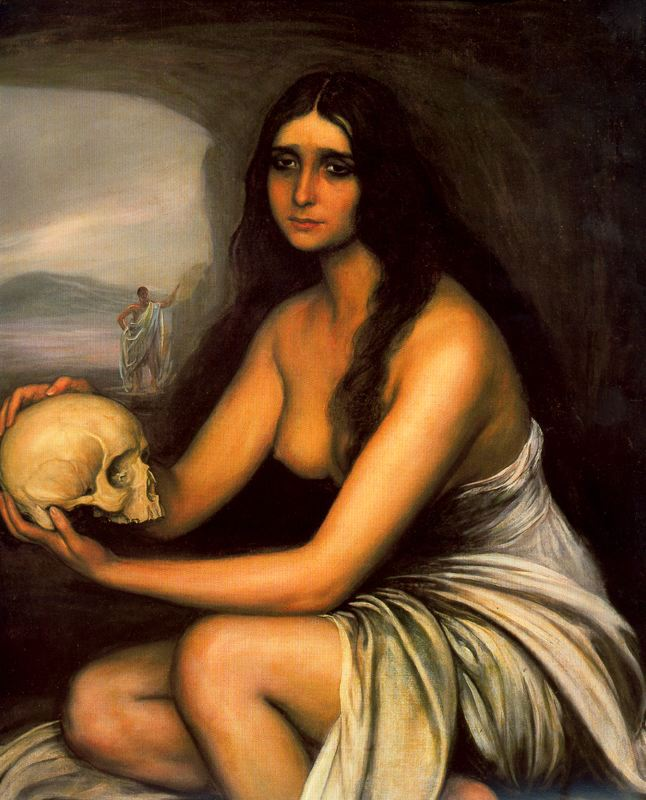
Magdalena by Julio Romero de Torres

The Archaeological and Ethnological Museum of Córdoba is a provincial museum located near the Guadalquivir River. The museum was officially opened in 1867 and shared space with the Museum of Fine Arts until 1920. In 1960, the museum was relocated to the Renaissance Palace of Páez de Castillo where it remains to present day. The Archaeological and Ethnological Museum has eight halls which contain pieces from the middle to late Bronze Age, to Roman culture, Visigothic art, and Islamic culture.

The Julio Romero de Torres Museum is located next to the Guadalquivir and was opened in November 1931. The home of Julio Romero de Torres, has undergone many renovations and been turned into a museum and it has also been home to several other historical institutions such as the Archaeological Museum (1868–1917) and the Museum of Fine Arts. Many of the works include paintings and motifs done by Julio Romero de Torres himself.

The Fine Arts Museum of Córdoba is located next to the Julio Romero de Torres Museum which it shares a courtyard with. The building originally was for the old Hospital for Charity but after that the building went under many renovations and renewals to become the renaissance style building it is today. The Museum of Fine Arts contains many works from the baroque period, medieval renaissance art, work from the 18th, 19th and 20th centuries, drawings, mannerist art and other unique works.

The Diocesan Museum is located in the Córdoba's Episcopal Palace which was built upon the former Umayyad alcázar. The collection within houses many paintings, sculptures and furniture.

Another museum within Córdoba are the Caliphal Baths.

== Festivals ==
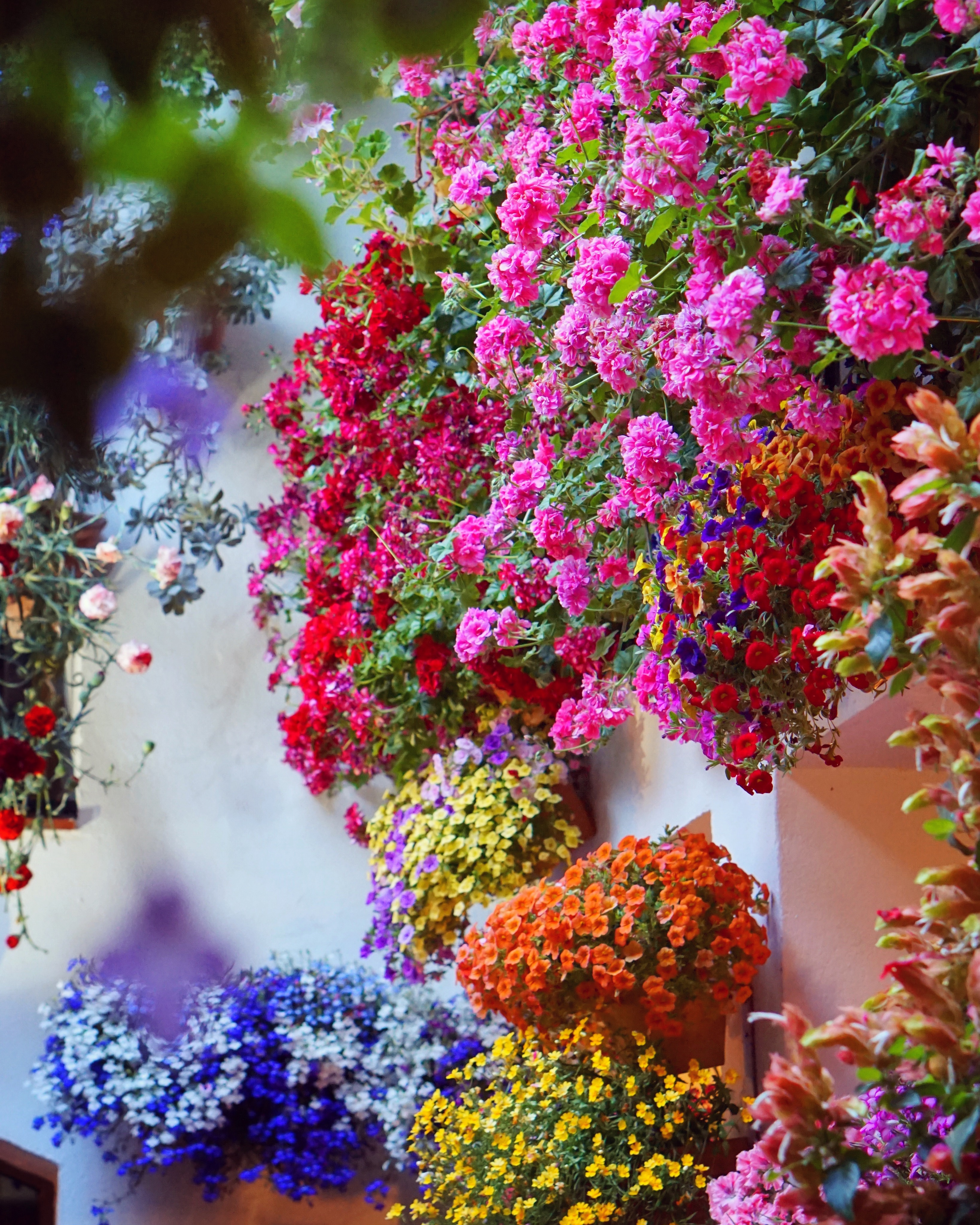
Interior patio during the Courtyards Festival of Córdoba – World Heritage

Tourism is especially intense in Córdoba during May as this month hosts three of the most important annual festivals in the city:

- Las Cruces de Mayo (The May Crosses of Córdoba). This festival takes place at the beginning of the month. During three or four days, crosses of around 3m height are placed in many squares and streets and decorated with flowers and a contest is held to choose the most beautiful one. Usually there is regional food and music near the crosses.
- Los Patios de Córdoba (The Courtyards Festival of Córdoba – World Heritage). This festival is celebrated during the second and third week of the month. Many houses of the historic center open their private patios to the public and compete in a contest. Both the architectonic value and the floral decorations are taken into consideration to choose the winners. It is usually very difficult and expensive to find accommodation in the city during the festival.
- La Feria de Córdoba (The Fair of Córdoba). This festival takes place at the end of the month and is similar to the better known Seville Fair with some differences, mainly that the Sevilla Fair has majority private casetas (tents run by local businesses), while the Córdoba Fair has majority public ones.

== Politics and government ==
Local administration

As of 2019 José María Bellido Roche (PP) is the mayor of Córdoba.

The City Council of Córdoba is divided into different areas: the Presidency; Human Resources, Management, Tax and Public Administration; City Planning, Infrastructure, and Environment; Social; and Development. The Council holds regular plenary sessions once a month, but can hold extraordinary plenary session to discuss issues and problems affecting the city.

The Governing Board, chaired by the mayor, consists of four IU councillors, three of PSOE, and three non-elected members. The municipal council consists of 29 members: 11 of PP, 7 of PSOE, 4 of IU, 4 of Ganemos Córdoba, 2 of Ciudadanos and 1 of Unión Cordobesa.

List of mayors since the democratic elections of 1979
Legislature	Name	Party
1979–1983	Julio Anguita	PCE
1983–1987	Julio Anguita (until 1 February 1986)	PCE
1983–1987	Herminio Trigo	IU
1987–1991	Herminio Trigo	IU
1991–1995	Herminio Trigo	IU
1991–1995	Manuel Pérez Pérez	IU
1995–1999	Rafael Merino	PP
1999–2003	Rosa Aguilar	IU
2003–2007	Rosa Aguilar	IU
2007–2011	Rosa Aguilar (until 23 April 2009)	IU
2007–2011	Andrés Ocaña	IU
2011–2015	José Antonio Nieto	PP
2015–2019	Isabel Ambrosio	PSOE
2019–	José María Bellido	PP

Administrative divisions

As of July 2008, the city is divided into 10 administrative districts, coordinated by the Municipal district boards, which in turn are subdivided into neighbourhoods:

District	District	Location
Centro	Poniente-Sur	
Levante	Sur	
Noroeste	Sureste	
Norte-Sierra	Periurbano Este-Campiña	
Poniente-Norte	Periurbano Oeste-Sierra	
Periurbano Este-Campiña and Periurbano Oeste-Sierra not shown on the map

== Notable people ==
- Abd Allah al-Qaysi – Islamic jurist
- Abu al-Qasim Zahrawi – Islamic surgeon and physician
- Ahmad ibn Muhammad ibn Musa al-Razi – historian
- al-Qurtubi – jurist of the Maliki school
- Averroes – Islamic philosopher
- Blanca del Rey – flamenco dancer and choreographer
- Fernando Tejero – actor
- Fosforito – Flamenco artist
- Gabi Delgado-López – musician
- Hasdai ibn Shaprut – Jewish statesman, physician and scholar
- Hisae Yanase – artist
- Ibn as-Saffar – astronomer
- Ibn al-Samh – astronomer and mathematician
- Ibn Hazm – Islamic theologian and jurist
- Ibn Maḍāʾ – Islamic linguist
- India Martinez – flamenco and pop singer
- Joaquín Cortés – Flamenco artist
- Juan de Mena – Medieval poet
- Juan Serrano – Flamenco artist
- Julio Romero de Torres – painter
- Lucan – Roman poet
- Luis de Góngora – Renaissance-era poet
- Maimonides – Jewish philosopher and rabbi
- Manolete – matador
- Martin of Soure – Portuguese captive canon
- Mundhir bin Sa'īd al-Ballūṭī – Islamic jurist
- Paco Peña – Flamenco artist
- Seneca, Stoic philosopher
- Vicente Amigo – Flamenco artist

== Sports ==
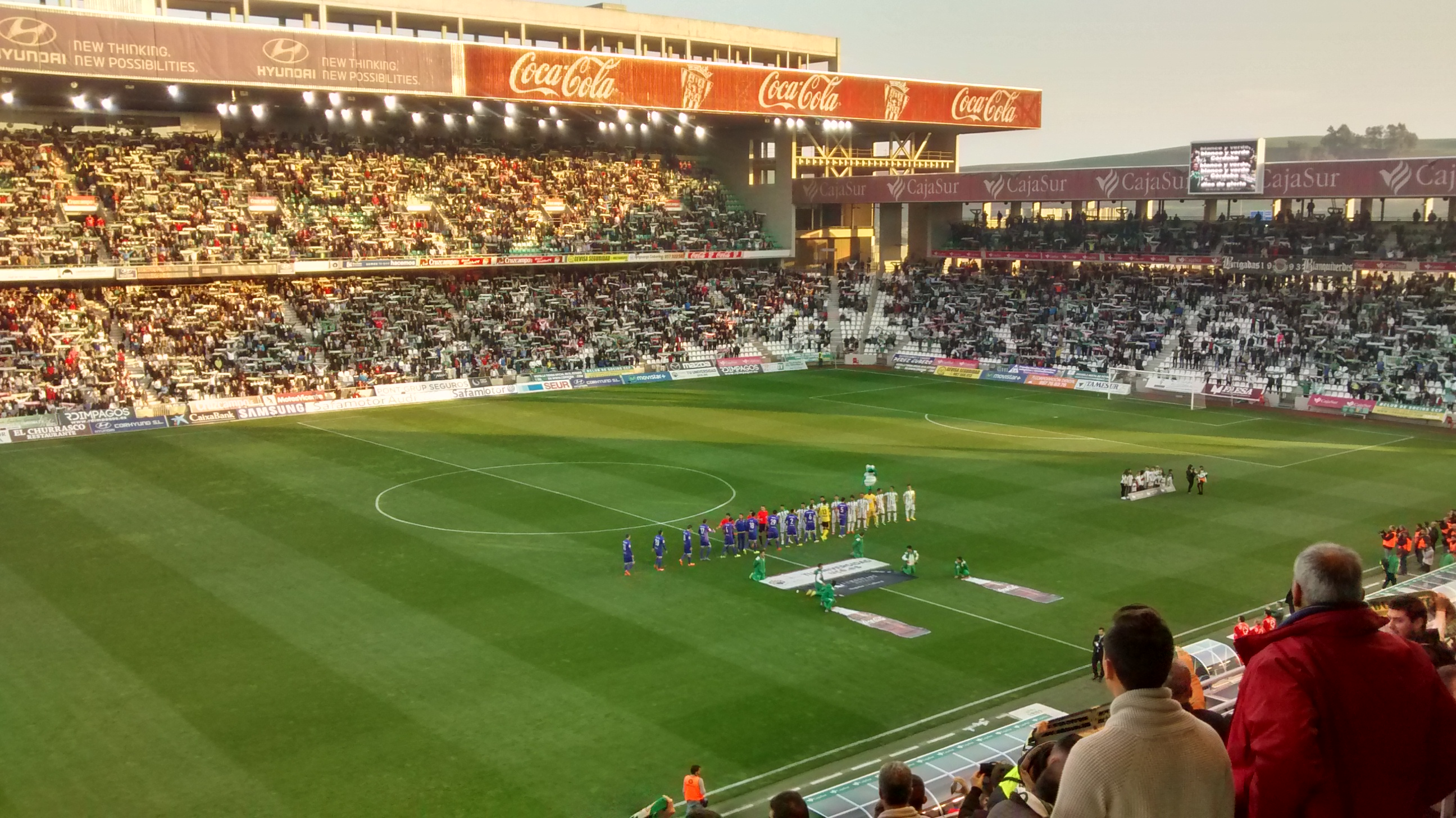
Segunda División match between Córdoba C.F. and C.D. Leganés at Estadio Nuevo Arcángel, January 2016

Córdoba's main sports team is its association football team, Córdoba CF, which plays in the Spanish LaLiga HyperMotion following a brief one-season tenure in La Liga during the 2014–15 season. Home matches are played at the Estadio Nuevo Arcángel, which has 20,989 seats.

Córdoba also has a professional futsal team, Córdoba Patrimonio de la Humanidad, which plays in the Primera División de Futsal. The local basketball club, Córdoba CB, had a professional team which played in the Segunda FEB. The futsal and the basketball teams plays the majority of its home games at the 3,500 seat Palacio Municipal de Deportes Vista Alegre.

== Transport ==
=== Rail ===
Córdoba railway station is connected by high speed trains to the following Spanish cities: Madrid, Barcelona, Seville, Málaga and Zaragoza. More than 20 trains per day connect the downtown area, in 54 minutes, with Málaga María Zambrano station, which provides interchange capability to destinations along the Costa del Sol, including Málaga Airport.

=== Airports ===
Córdoba has an airport, with seasonal flights to Palma de Mallorca, Gran Canaria and Barcelona. Other closest airports to the city are Seville Airport (110 km), Granada Airport (118 km) and Málaga Airport (136 km).

=== Road ===
The city is also well connected by highways with the rest of the country and Portugal. The A-45 and A-4 motorways serve the city.

==== Intercity buses ====
The main bus station is located next to the train station. Several bus companies operate intercity bus services to and from Córdoba.

== Gallery ==
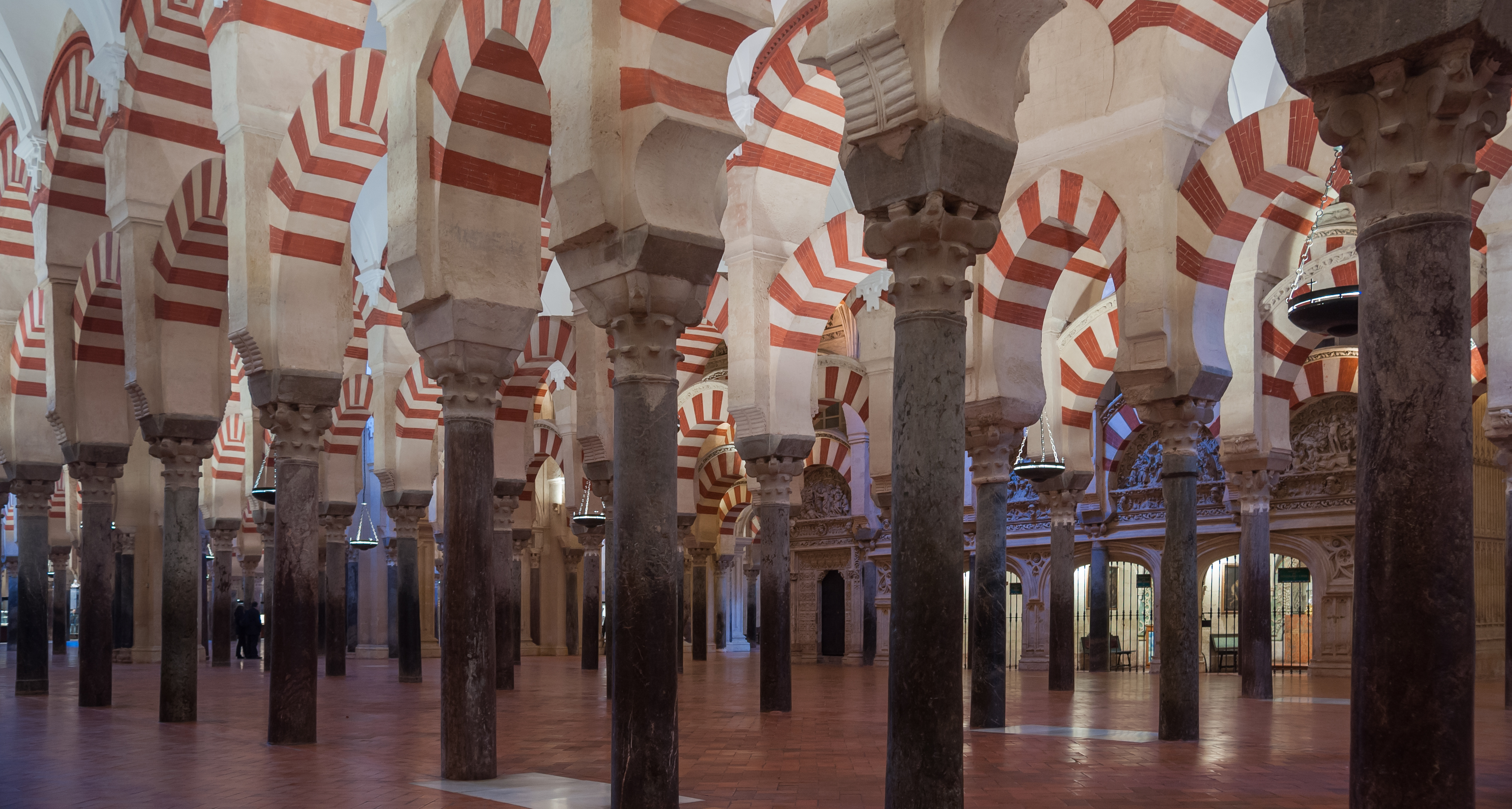
Columns in the Mosque–Cathedral

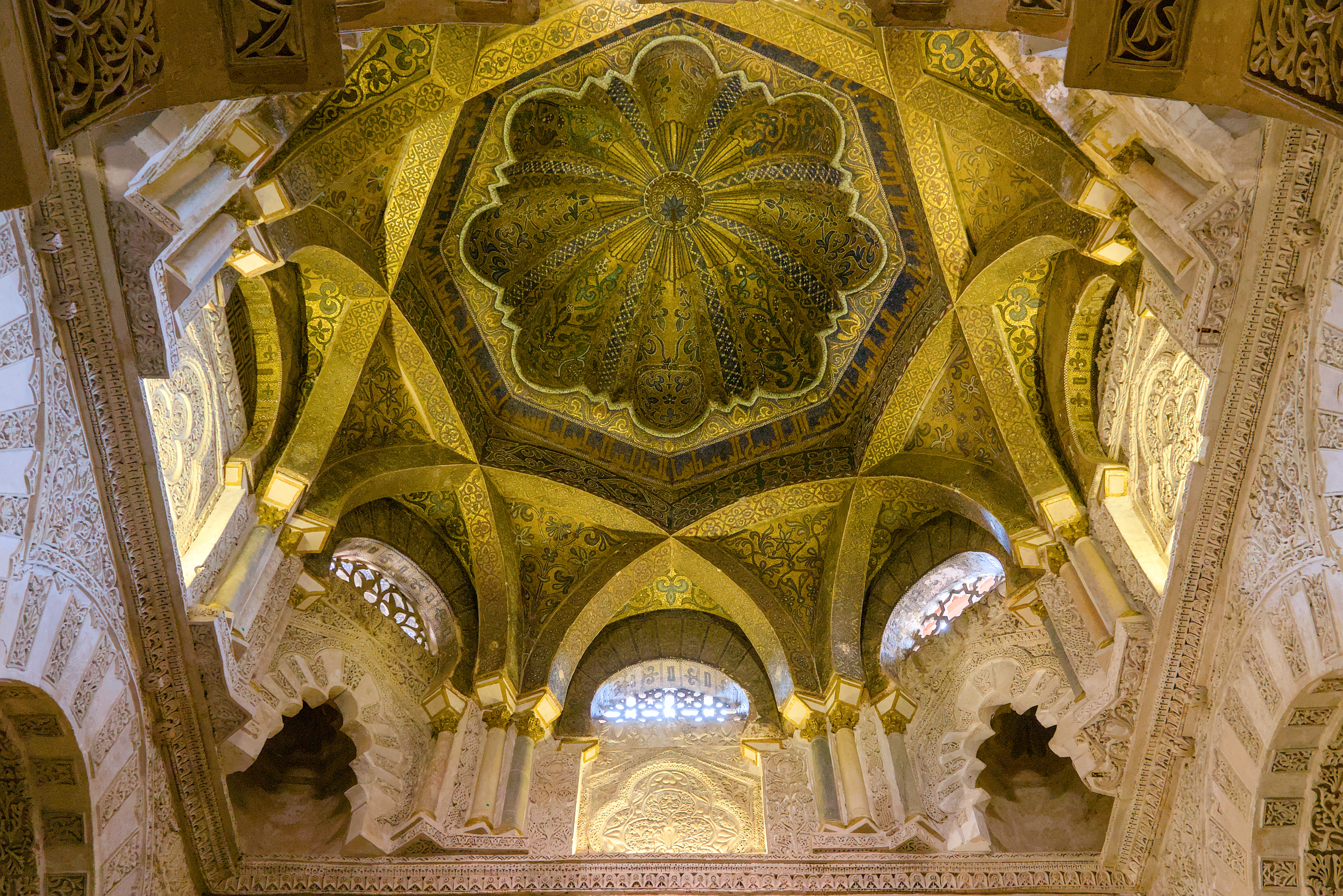
Center dome of the Mosque–Cathedral

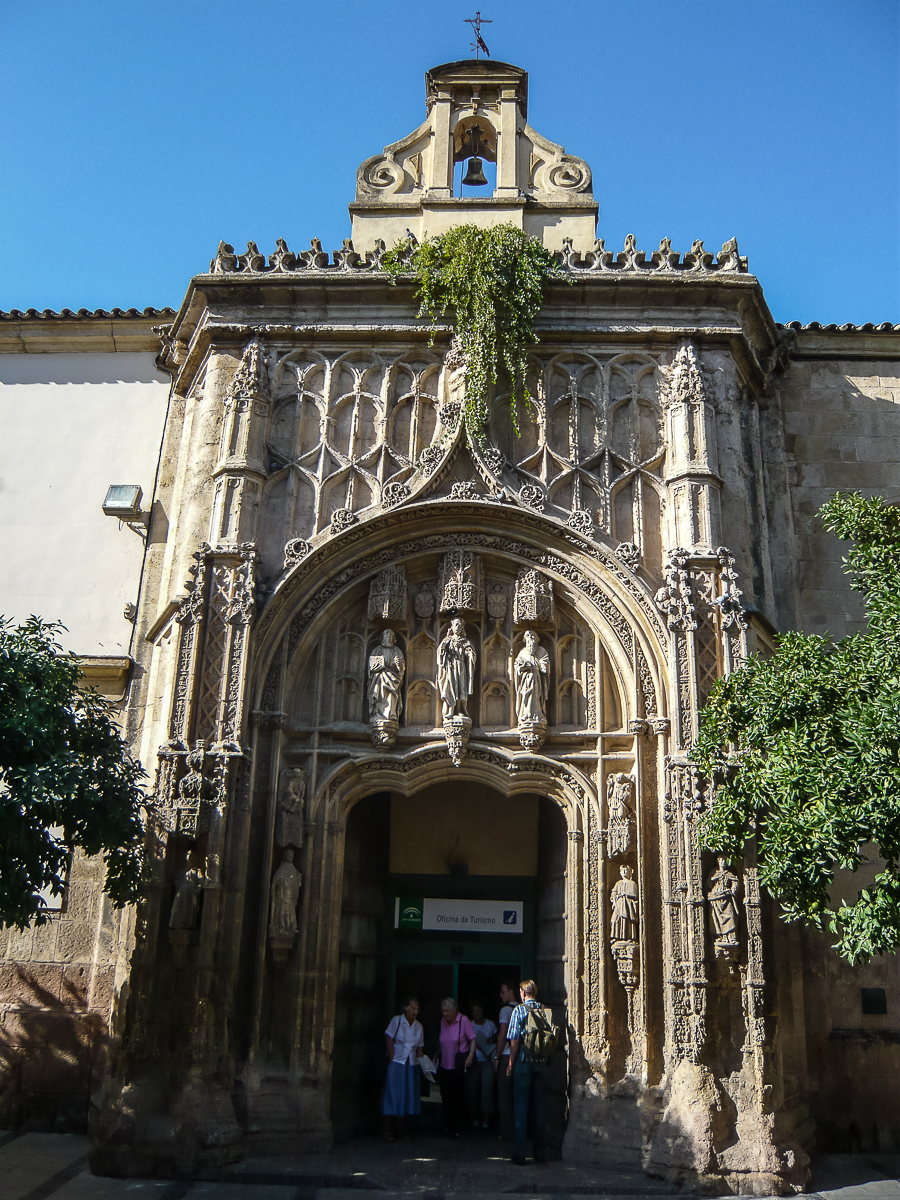
Hospital de San Sebastián

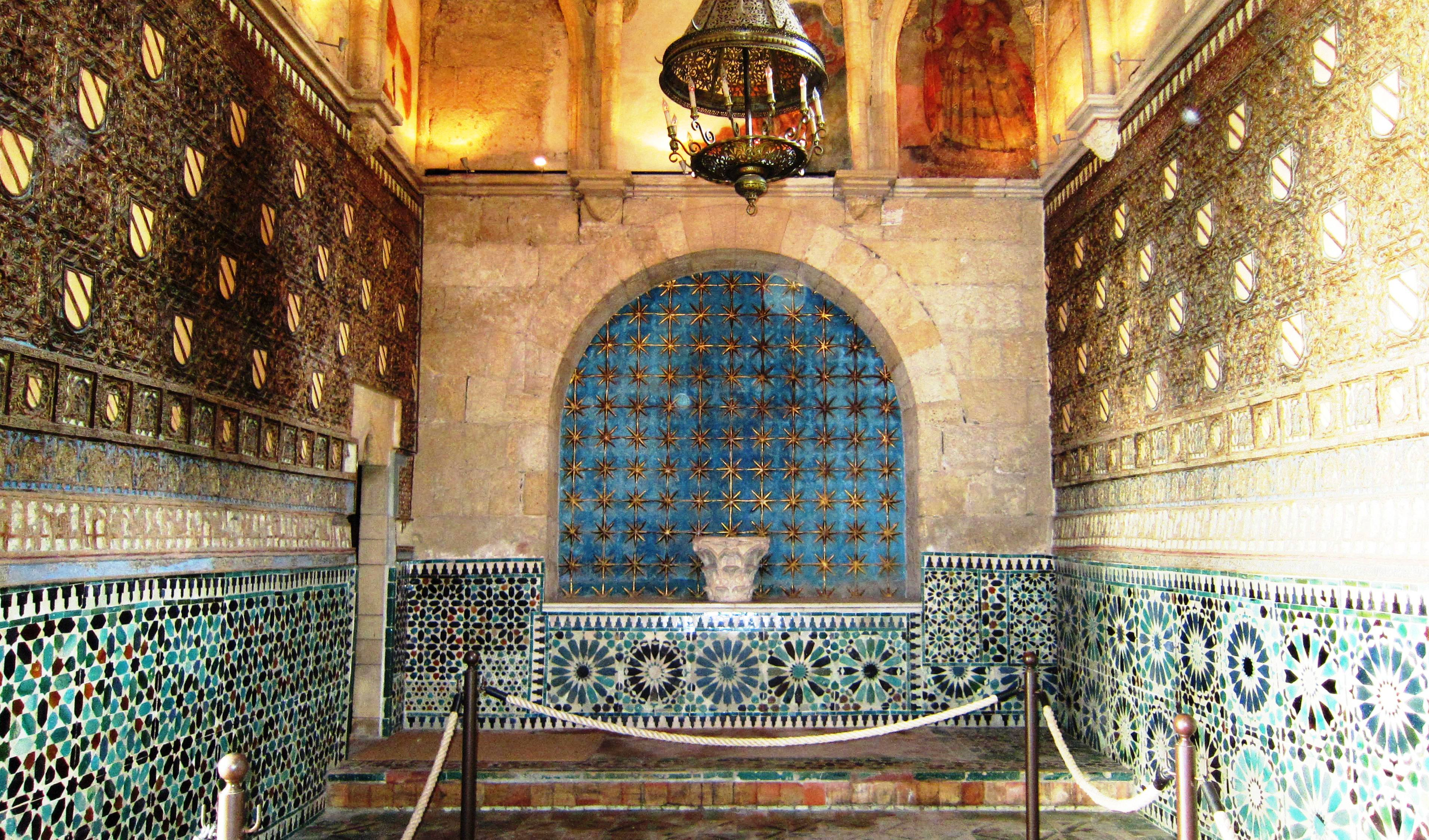
(Christian) Chapel of San Bartolomé (c. 1410)

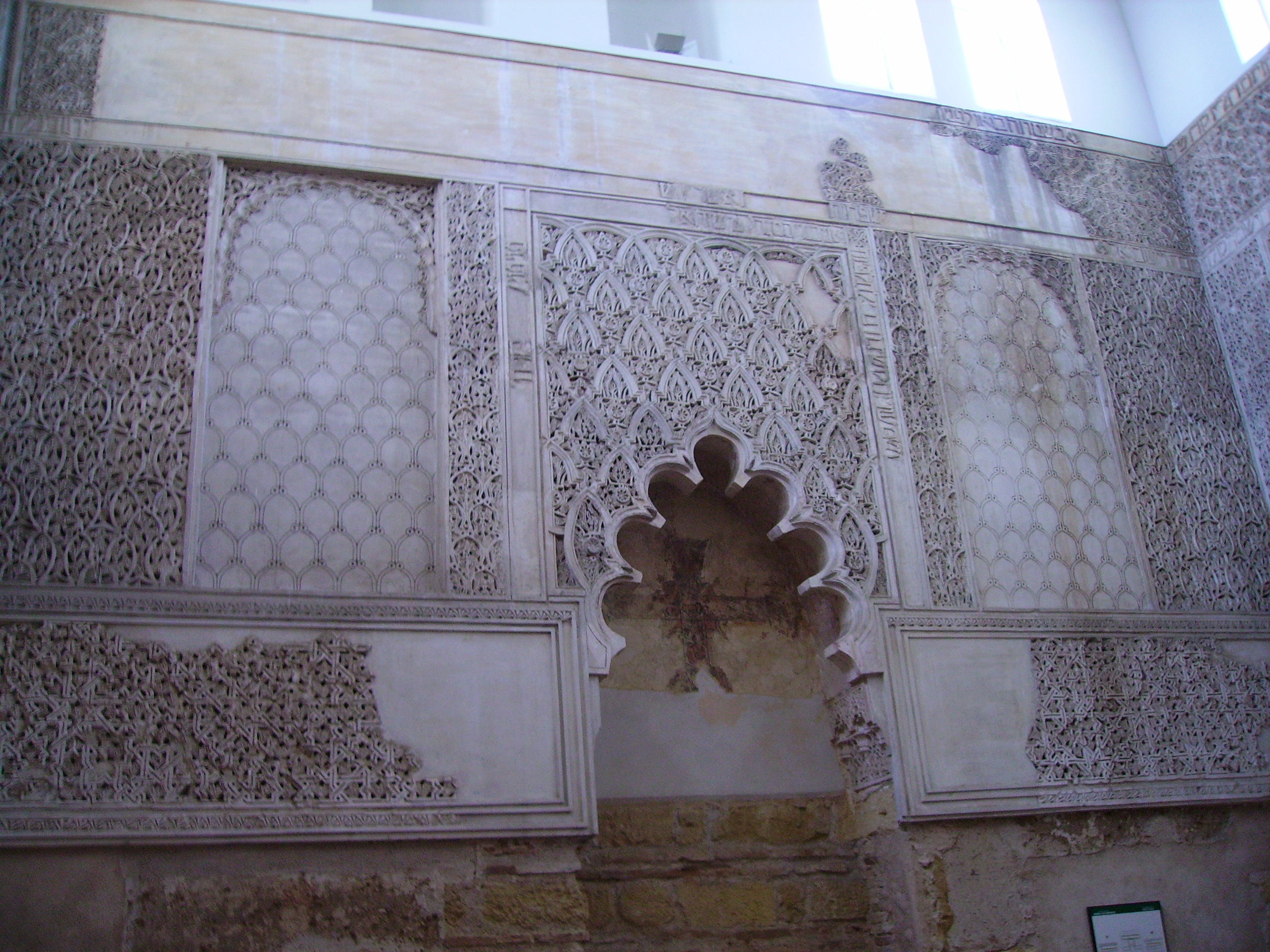
Córdoba Synagogue

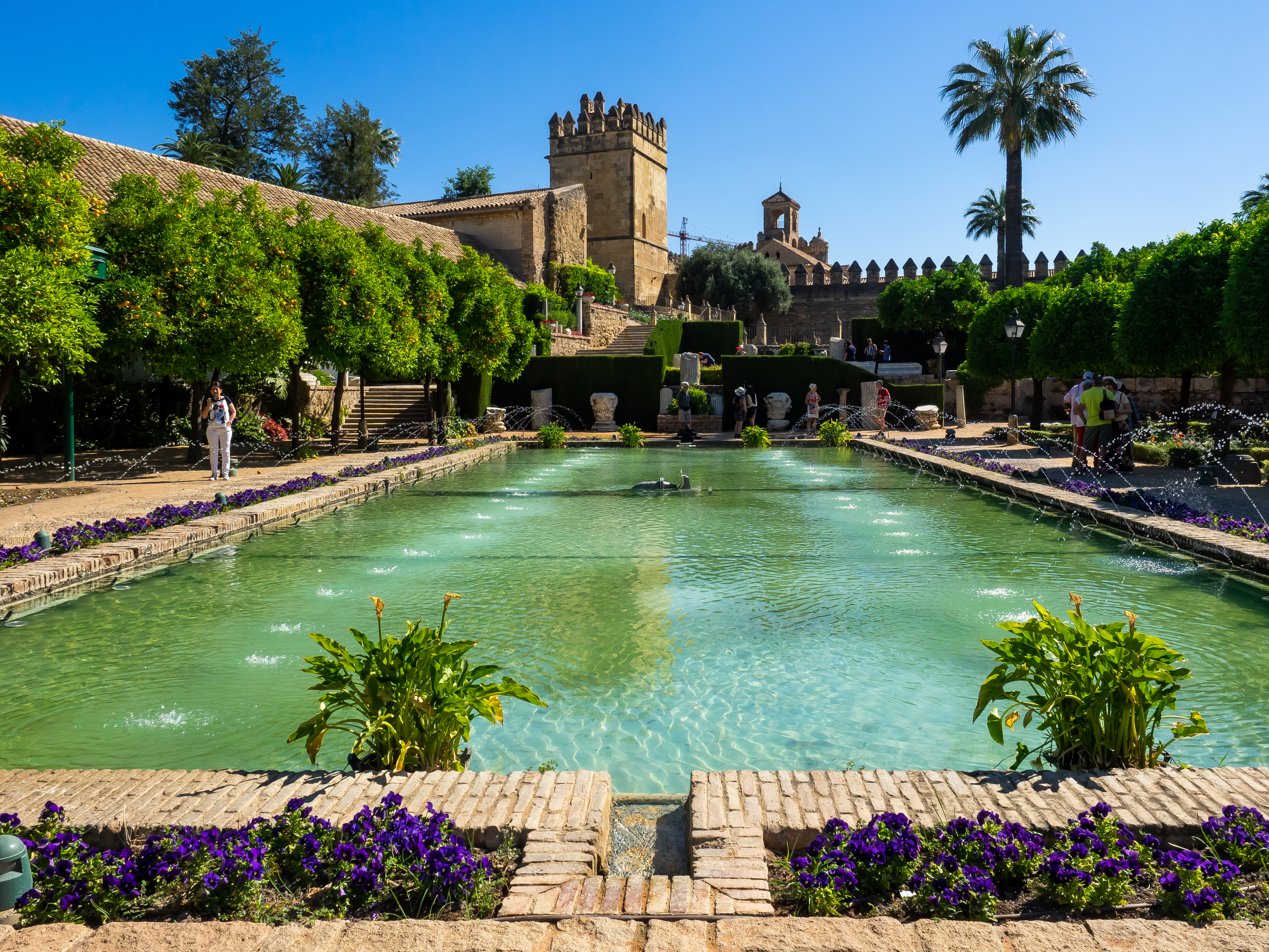
Gardens of the Alcázar de los Reyes Cristianos

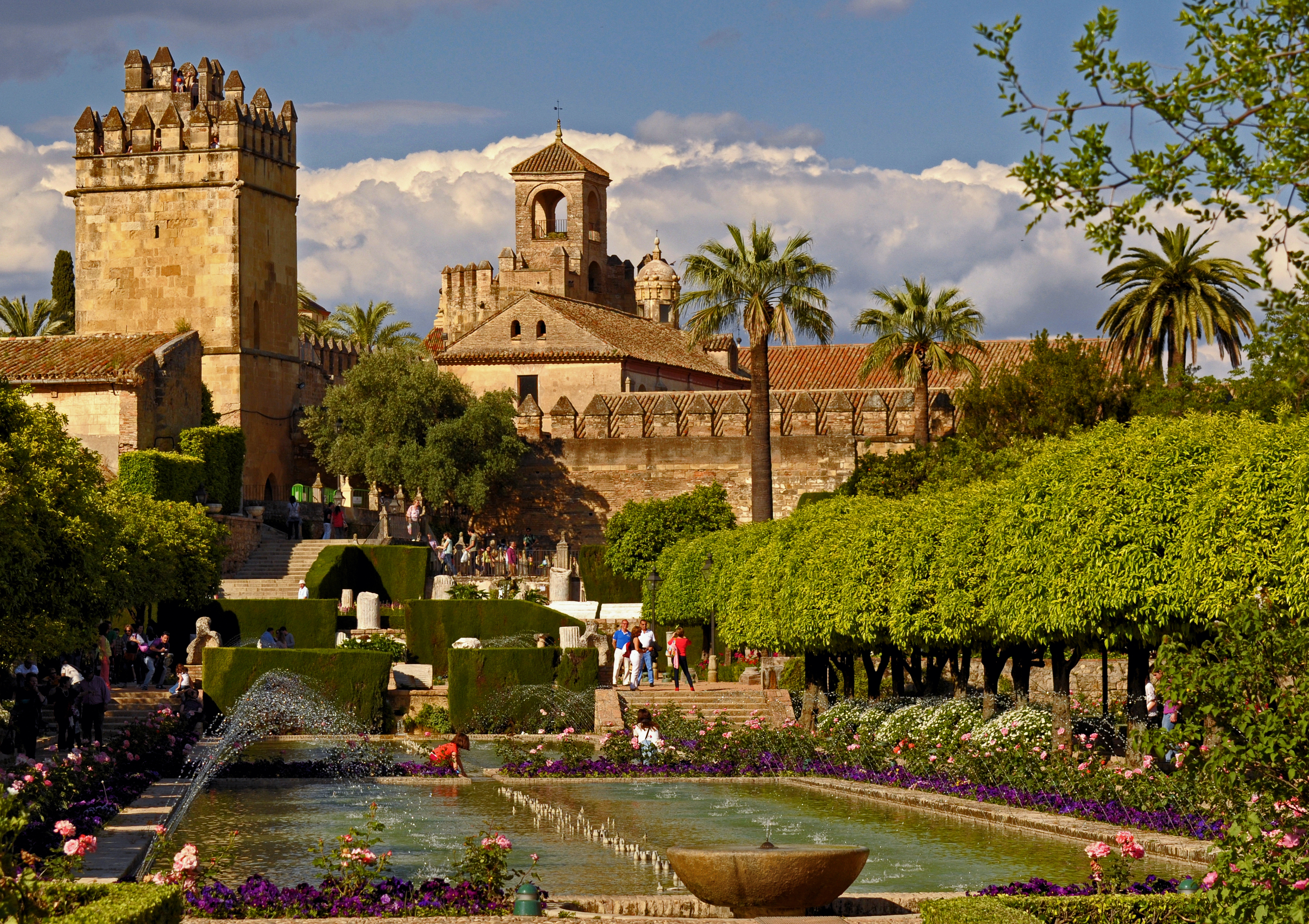
Alcazar Gardens

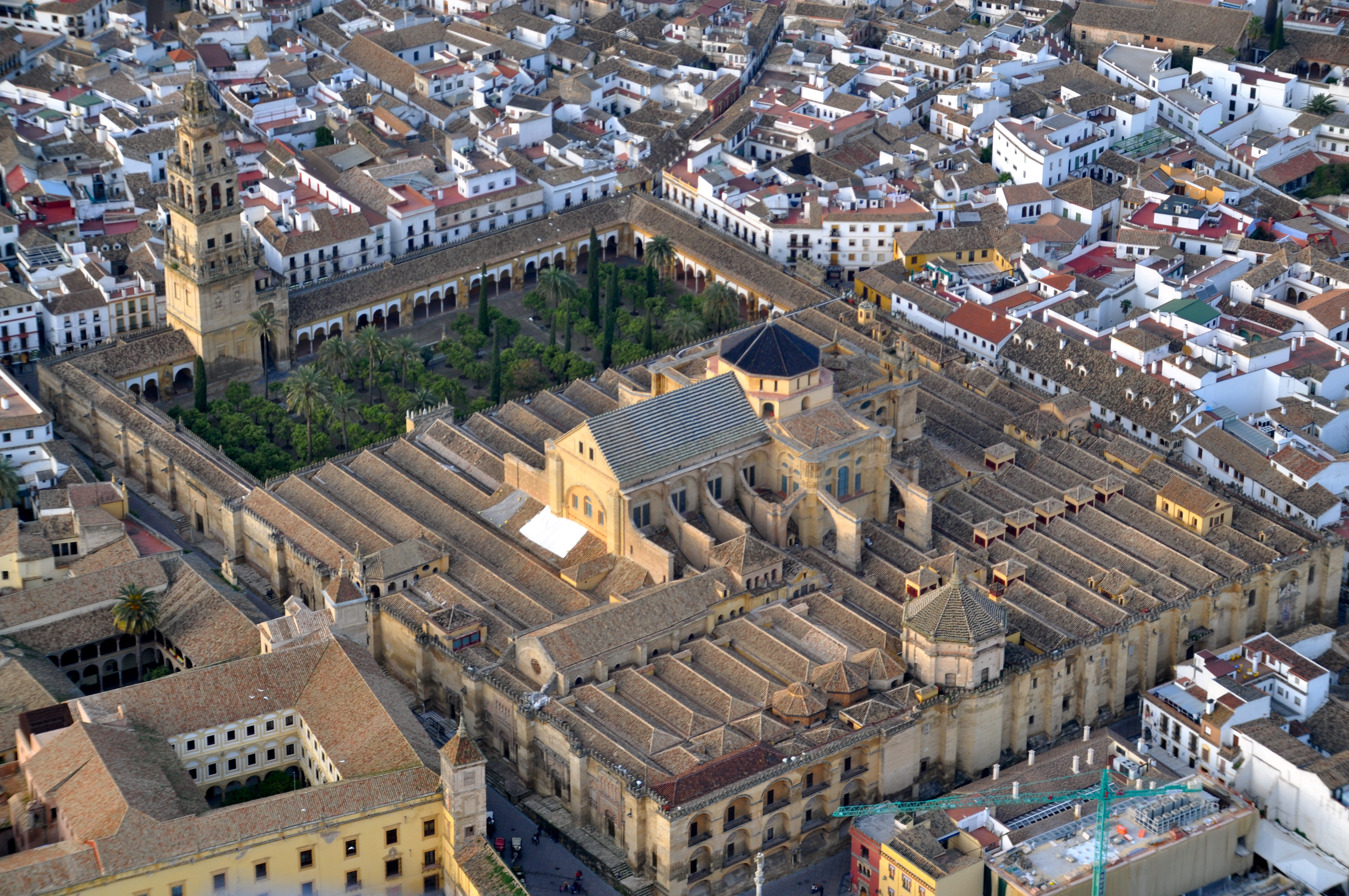
Mosque–Cathedral

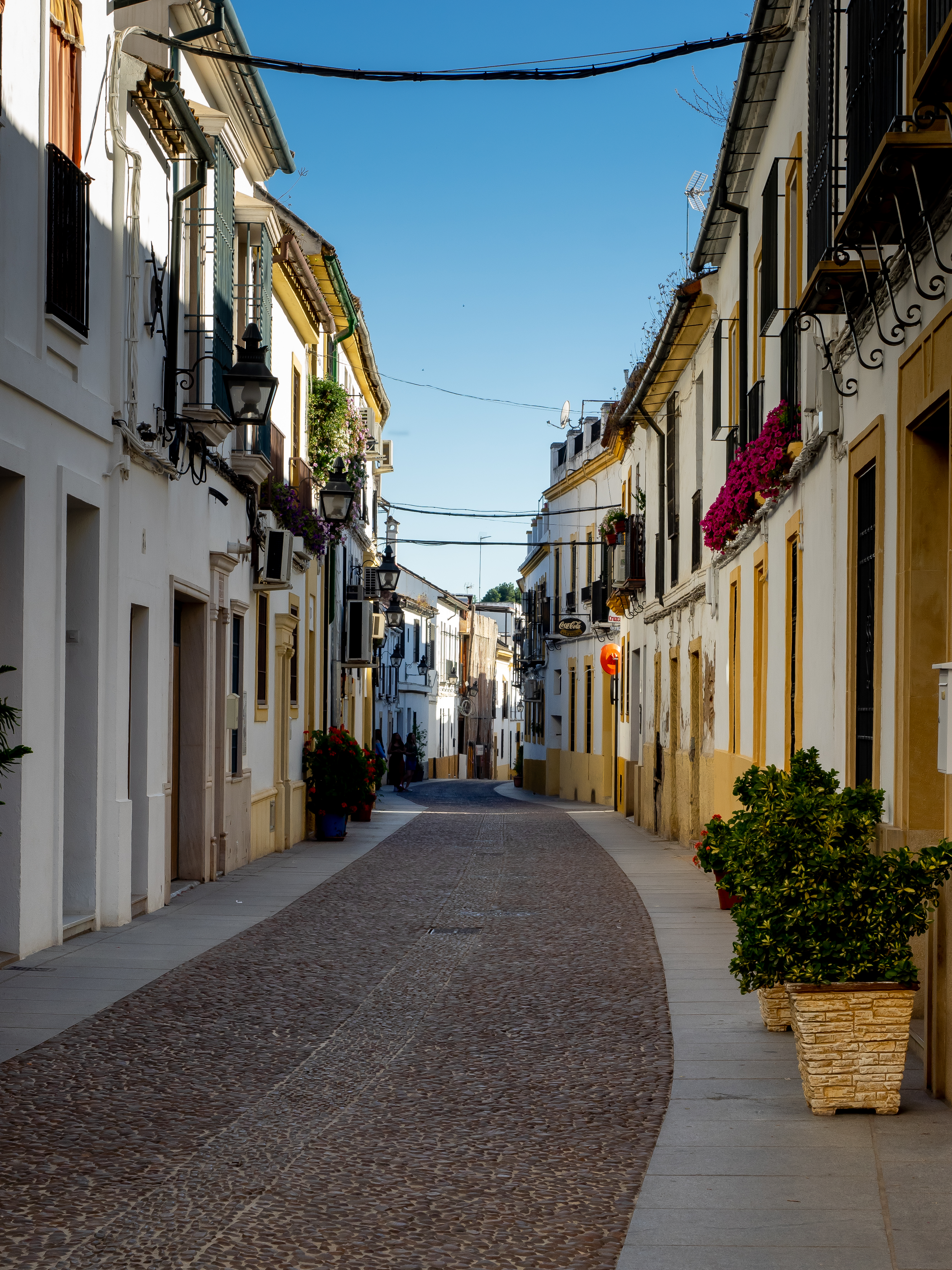
Street scene in Santa Maria, Córdoba

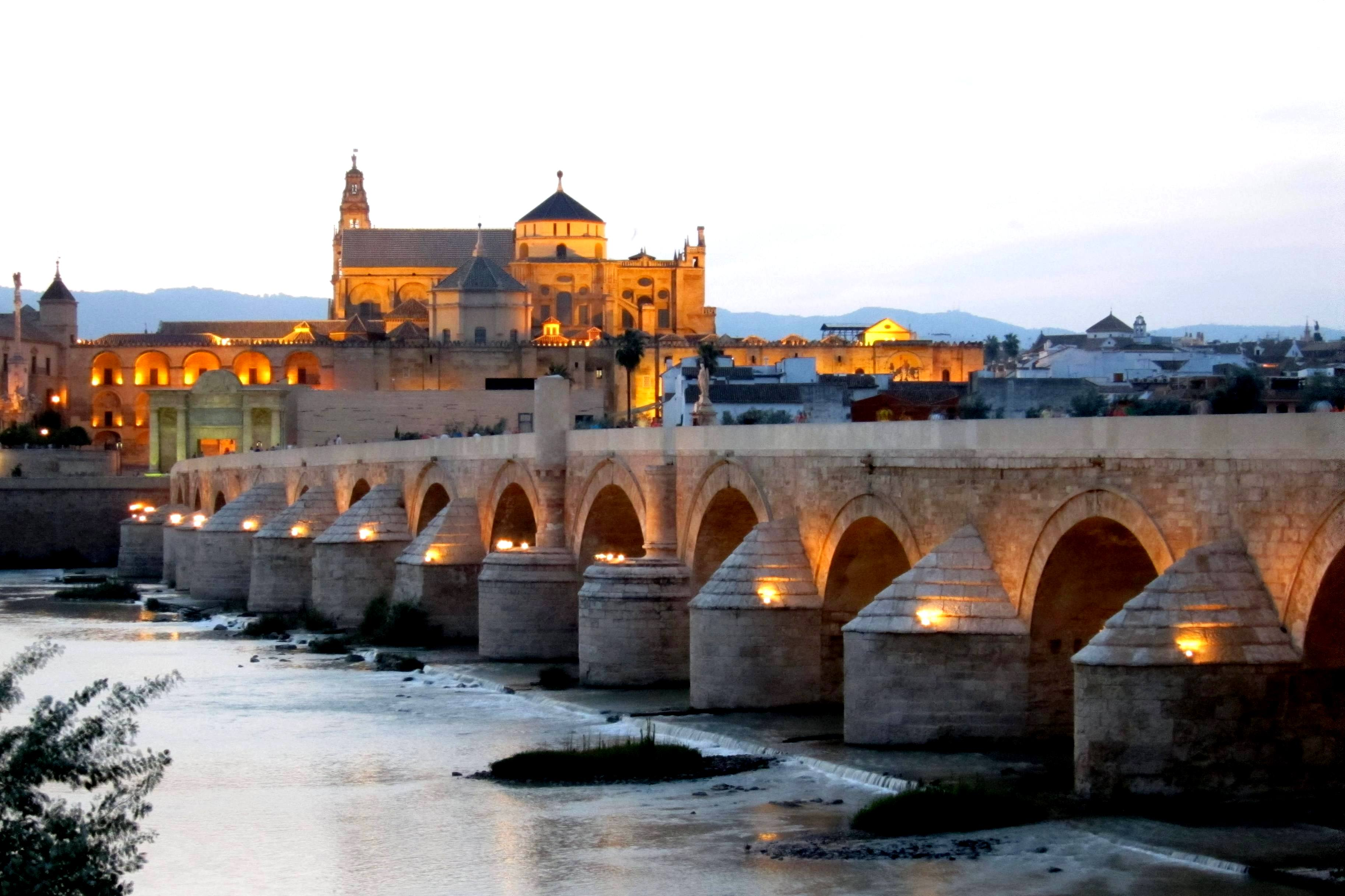
Roman bridge of Córdoba

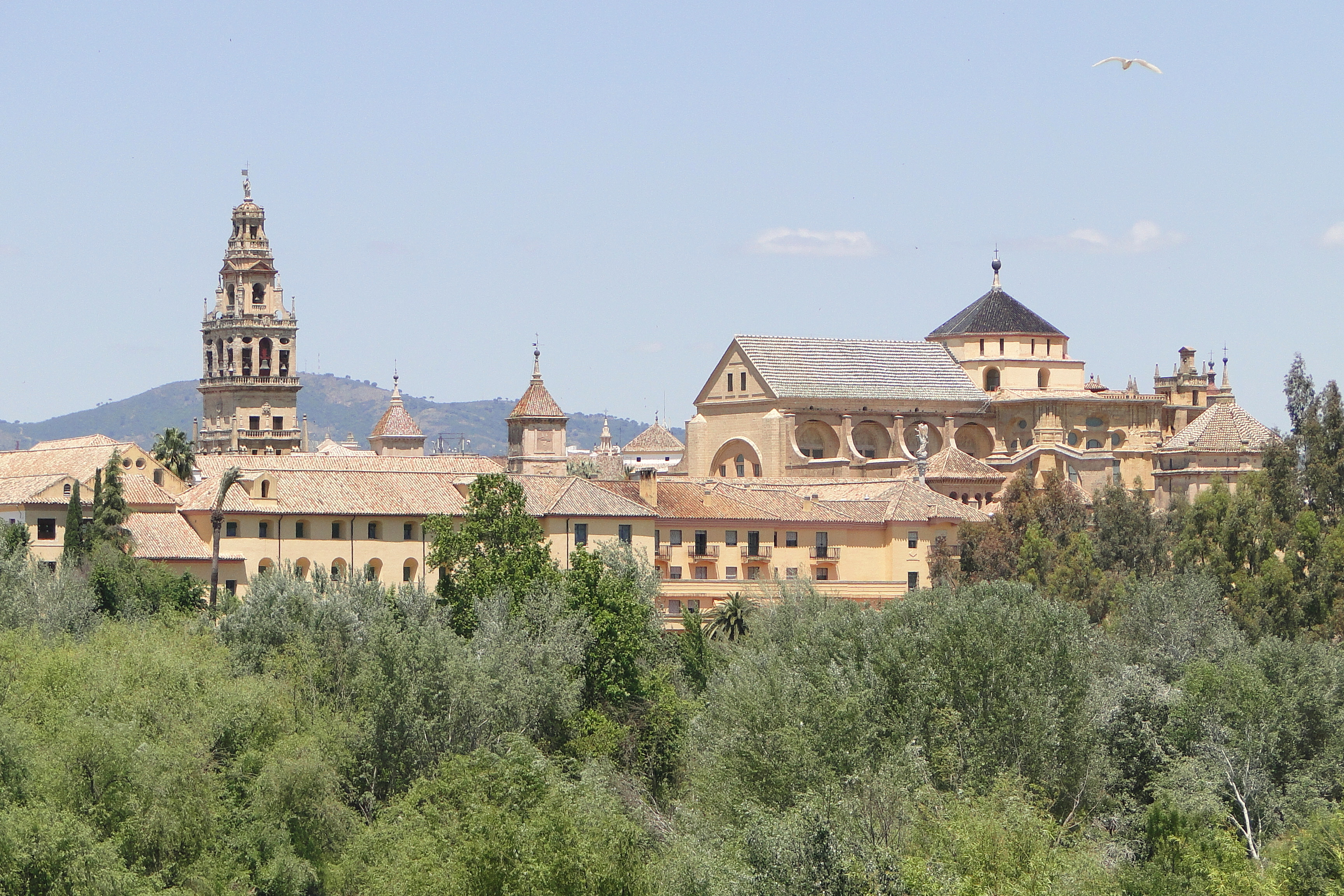
Riverfront viewed from Puente Romano, Córdoba

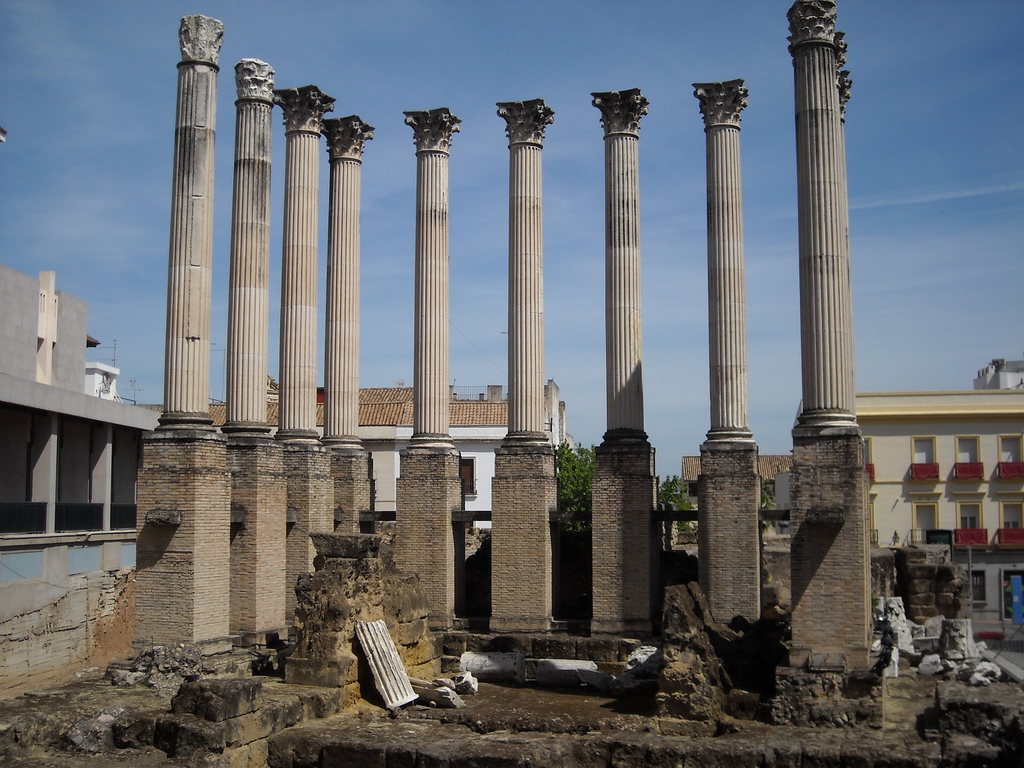
Roman temple of Córdoba

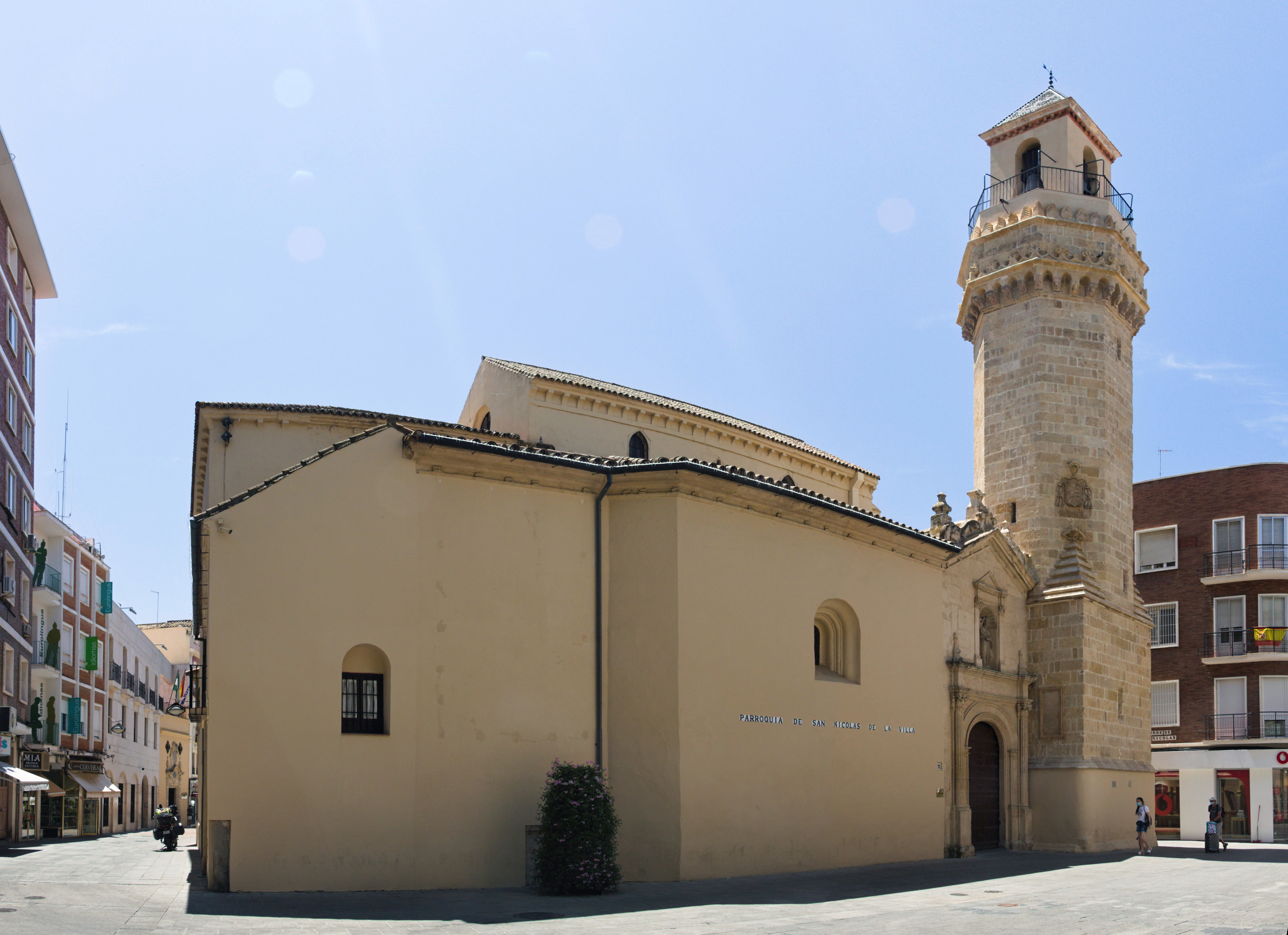
Church of San Nicolás de la Villa

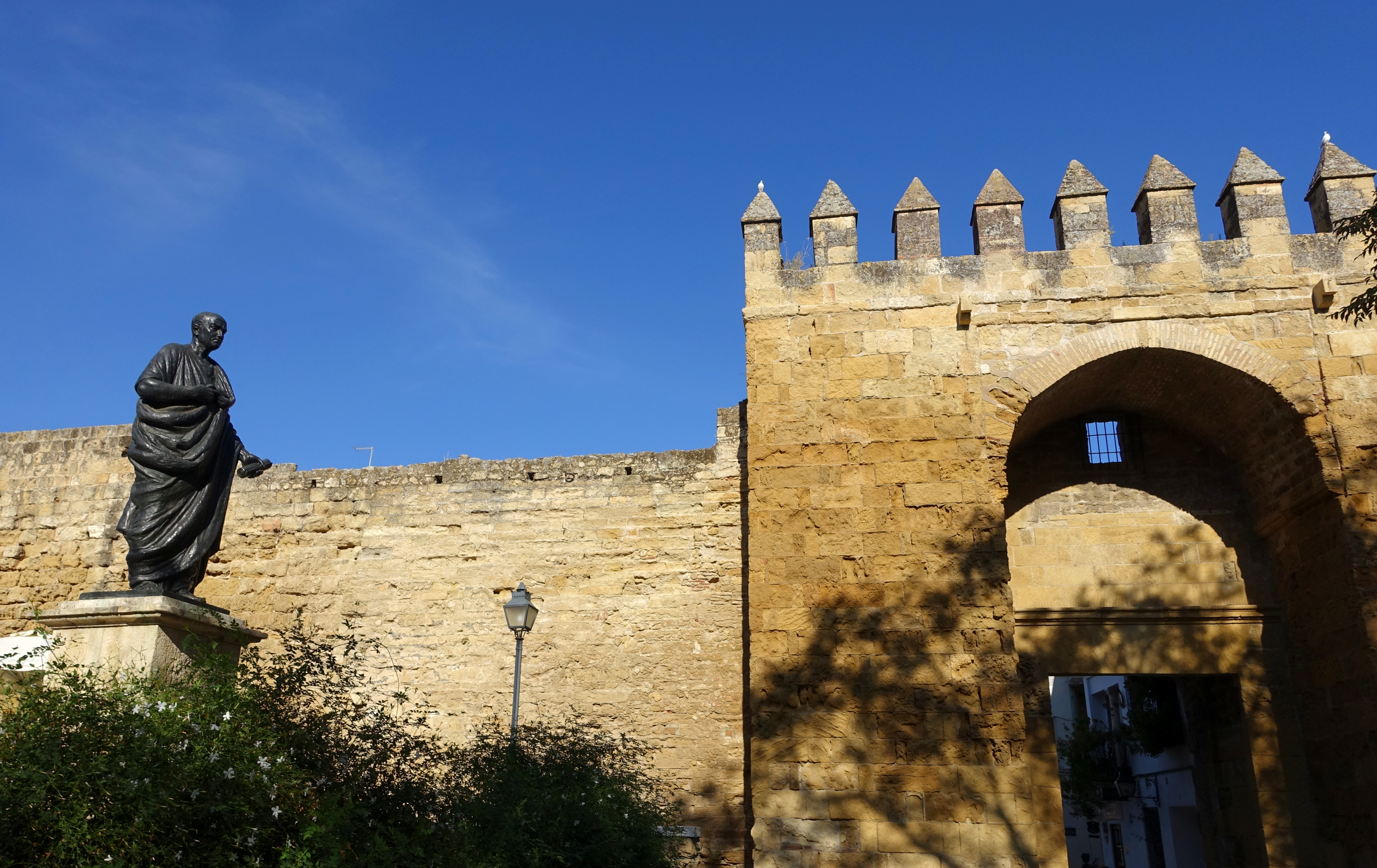
Statue of Seneca the Younger by the Puerta de Almodóvar

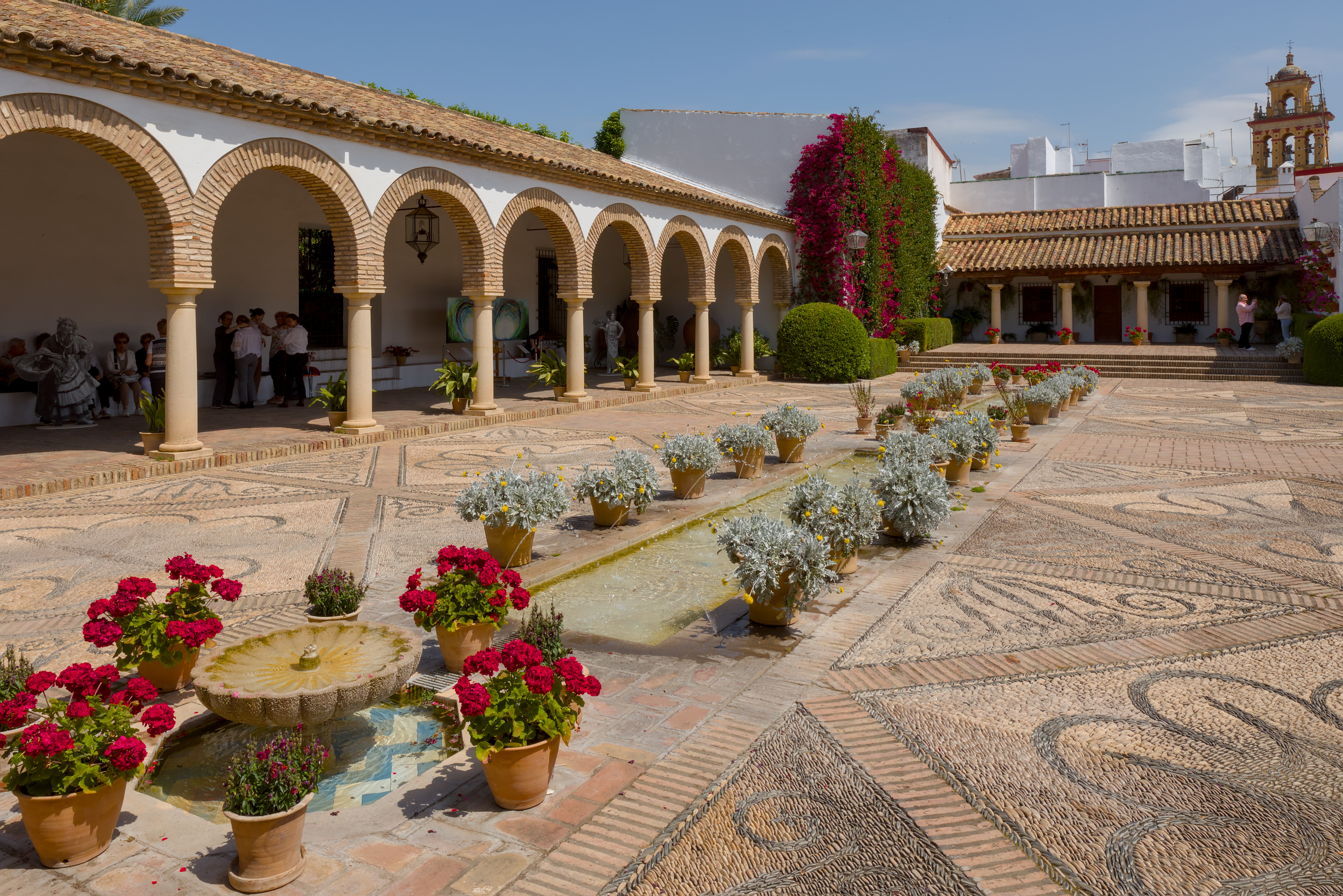
Viana Palace

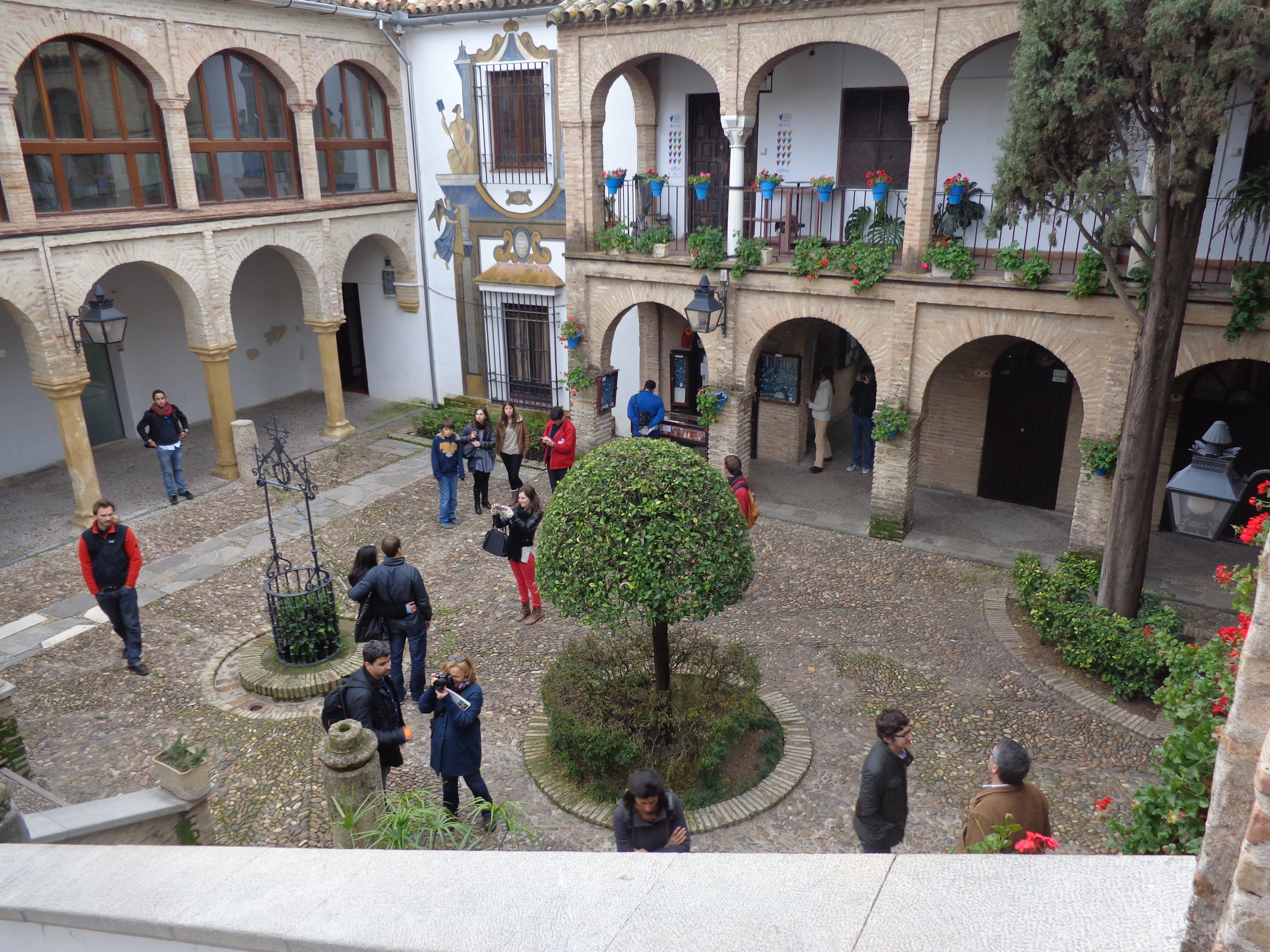
Patio del Zoco

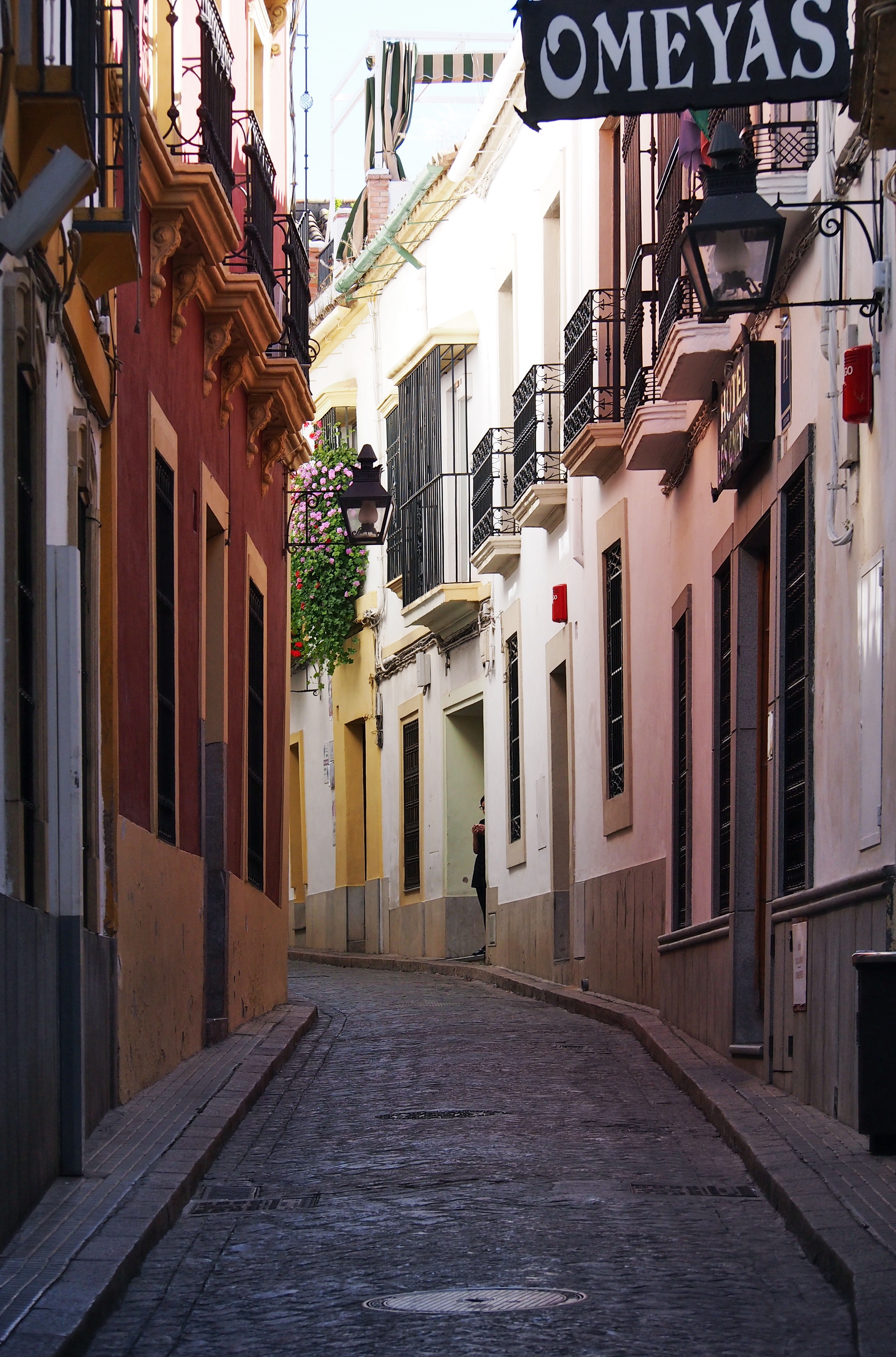
Calle Encarnación

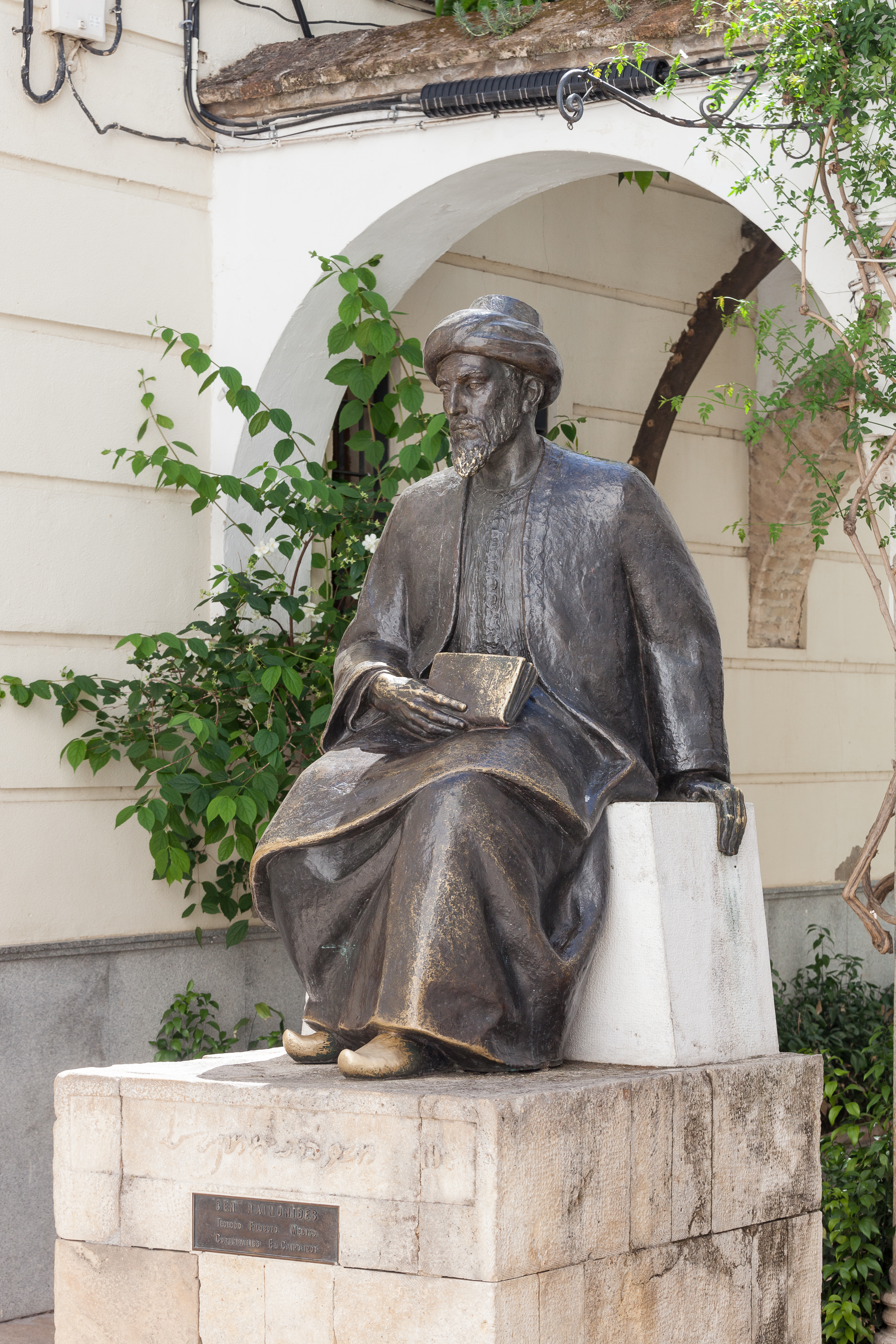
Statue of Ben Maimónides

== Twin towns – sister cities ==
Córdoba is twinned with:

- Kairouan, Tunisia (1968)
- Lahore, Pakistan (1968)
- Córdoba, Argentina (1969)
- Córdoba, Mexico (1980)
- Bukhara, Uzbekistan (1983)
- Smara, Western Sahara (1987)
- Fez, Morocco (1990)
- Old Havana, Cuba (2000)
- Damascus, Syria (2002)
- Santiago de Compostela, Spain (2004)
- Nuremberg, Germany (2010)
- Nîmes, France (2013)

== See also ==
- Diario de Córdoba
- List of municipalities in Córdoba

== Bibliography ==
- Bennison, Amira K. (2016). The Almoravid and Almohad Empires. Edinburgh University Press. ISBN 978-0-7486-4682-1.
- Burgueño, Jesús; Guerrero Lladós, Montse (2014). "El mapa municipal de España. Una caracterización geográfica". Boletín de la Asociación de Geógrafos Españoles (64). doi:10.21138/bage.1687. hdl:10459.1/47927. ISSN 0212-9426.
- Domínguez Bascón, Pedr (1995). "Inversiones de temperatura en el valle del Guadalquivir: un factor climático de gran influencia en el medio ambiente de la ciudad de Córdoba". Anales de Geografía de la Universidad Complutense. 15 (15): 281–288. ISSN 0211-9803.
- López Serrano, Miguel Jesús (2017). "Los inicios del ferrocarril en la provincia de Córdoba. Una visión a corto plazo" (PDF). Anuario Jurídico y Económico Escurialense (50). San Lorenzo de El Escorial: Real Centro Universitario Escorial-María Cristina: 579–600. ISSN 1133-3677.
- Scales, Peter S. (1997). "Cordoba under the Umayyads, a 'Syrian' Garden City? Urban layout of 10th-century Cordoba and its relationship to the urban layout of Damascus". In De Boe &, Guy; Verhaeghe, Frans (eds.). Urbanism in Medieval Europe (Papers of the 'Medieval Europe Brugge 1997' Conference, vol. 1). Zellik: Institute for the Archaeological Heritage. pp. 175–182.
- Torres Márquez, Martín (2013). "Paisajes del Valle medio del Guadalquivir cordobés: Funcionalidad y cambios" (PDF). Revista de Estudios Regionales (96): 135–180. ISSN 0213-7585.
- Villar Movellán, Alberto (1998). "Esquemas urbanos de la Córdoba renacentista" (PDF). Laboratorio de Arte: Revista del Departamento de Historia del Arte (11). Universidad de Sevilla: 101–120. ISSN 1130-5762.
