= Caliphal Baths =

Historic site in Cordoba, Spain

Coordinates: 37.877898°N 4.782243°W

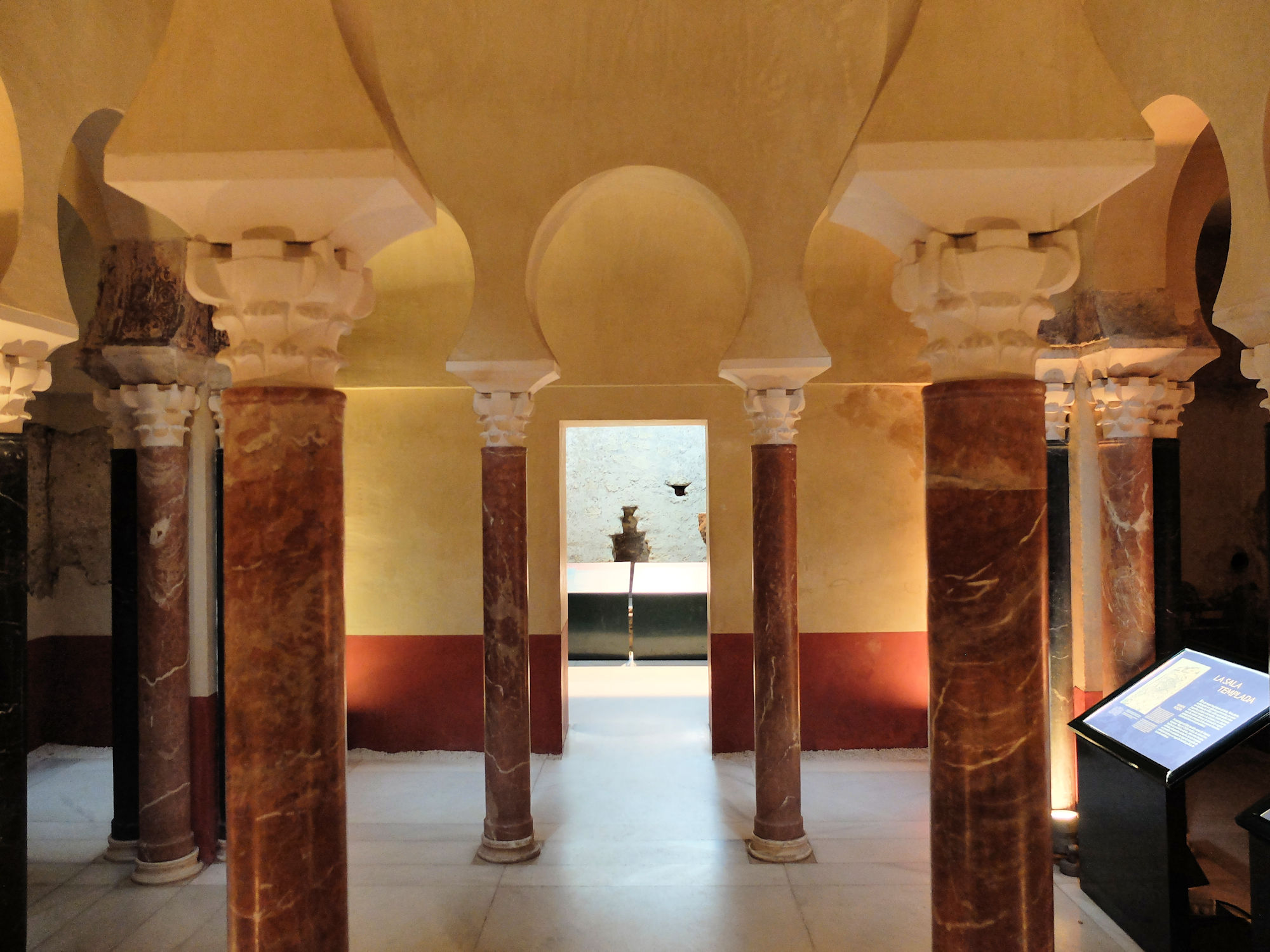
The interior of the Caliphal Baths, showing the reconstructed warm room

The Caliphal Baths are an Islamic bathhouse (or Arab baths) complex in Córdoba, Spain. They are situated in the historic centre which was declared a World Heritage Site by UNESCO in 1994. The complex was contiguous to the former Caliphal Palaces of the Umayyads (now the Alcázar de los Reyes Cristianos), whose inhabitants it served. Today the baths have been partially reconstructed and are open as a museum.

== History ==
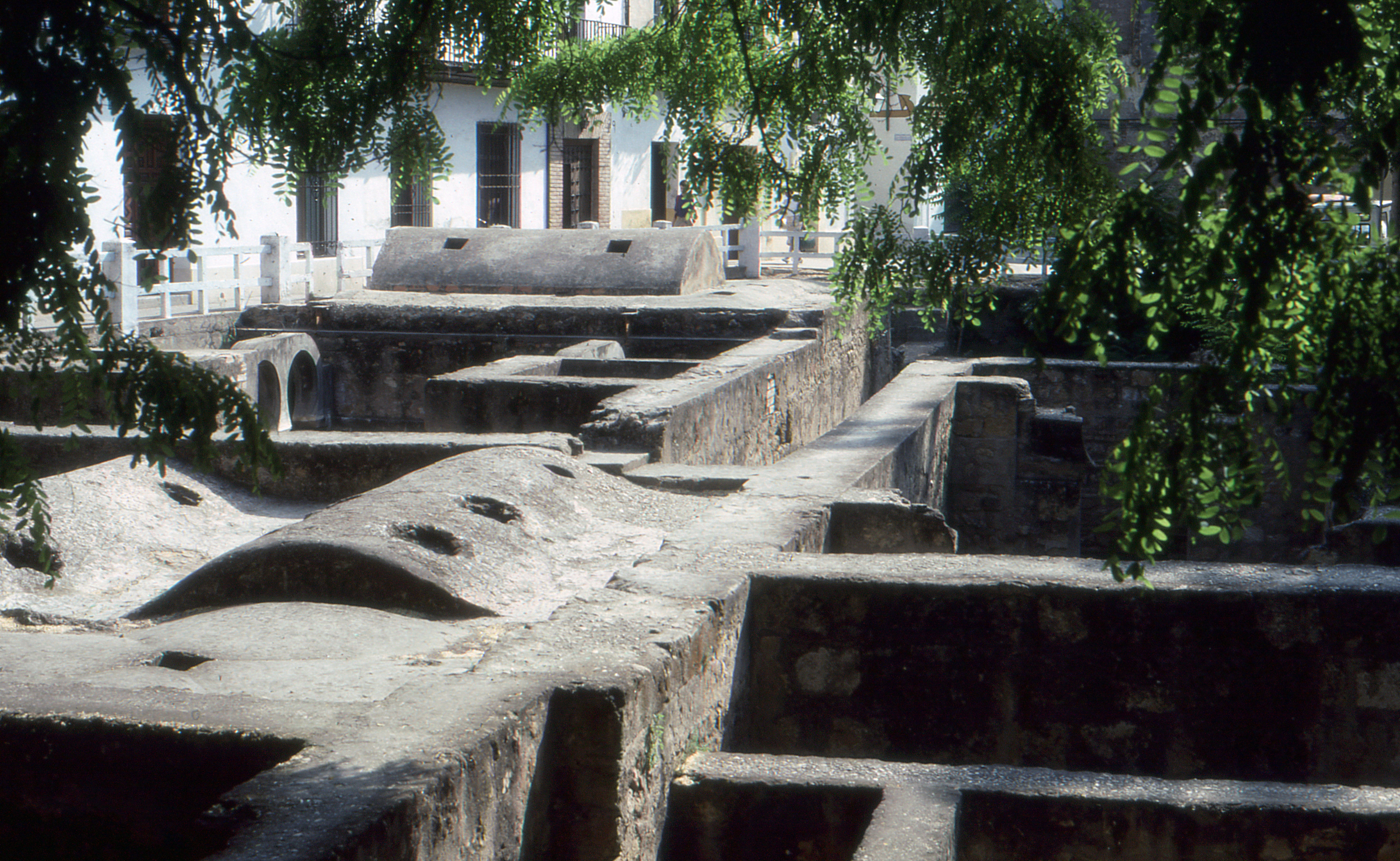
The uncovered remains of the bath complex in the 1990s (prior to their redevelopment as a museum)

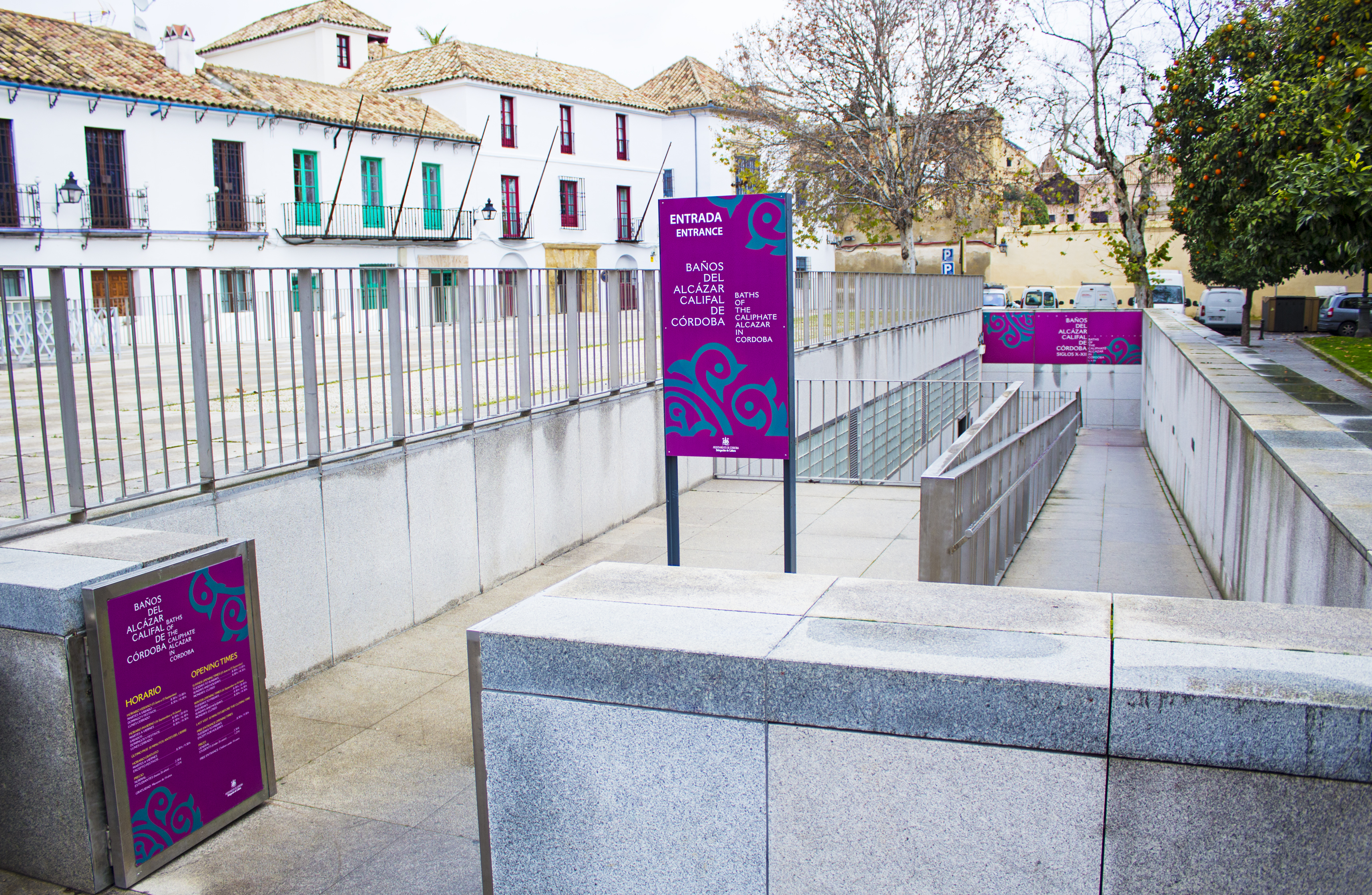
Entrance to the Caliphal Baths museum today (photo from 2016); the remains of the baths have been covered from the outside but their interior is now accessible to visitors

=== Construction and development under Muslim rule ===
The baths were constructed in the 10th century under the reign of Caliph Al-Hakam II (961–976) to serve the inhabitants of his palace. Bathhouses (hammams) of this type were a common feature of Muslim cities across the Muslim world, serving both a social and religious purpose. They assisted Muslims in the performance of ablutions, especially the full-body ablutions or ghusl, which were required for certain situations. They also served the general purpose of hygiene as well as being a place for socialization. Their layout and function was modeled on the Roman bathhouses which preceded them and which had already been part of urban life in the region for generations. The caliphal baths in Cordoba consisted of the usual sequence of cold room, warm room, and hot room.

After the fall of the Umayyad Caliphate in Cordoba in the 11th century, Cordoba came under the control of the Taifa (kingdom) of Seville. During this period the Alcazar (royal palace) still served as the governor's residence in the city, and a reception hall was added to the bath complex, still present in the reconstructed remains today. The Taifa kingdoms were soon conquered by the Almoravids at the end of the same century, and they in turn were conquered by the Almohads, who ruled over al-Andalus until the early 13th century. The Almohads constructed another bathhouse attached to the original caliphal complex, sharing some of the same facilities but with a new sequence of cold to hot rooms.

=== Christian era (after 1236) ===
Following the Christian conquest of the city by Ferdinand III in 1236, he donated one part of the Alcazar to the bishop of Cordoba (today the Episcopal Palace) while the rest continued to be used as a royal residence. The baths continued to be used by the new Christian rulers and a water basin for bathing was added to the more recent Almohad baths. A century later, in 1328, King Alfonso XI decided to build a new set of baths within the royal palace for his favourite mistress, Leonor de Guzmán, which can still be seen today in the Christian Alcazar. At the same time, the old Arab baths were buried in order to create a small square known as the Campillo del Rey. In 1588 the square was renamed Campo Santo de los Mártires after Ambrosio de Morales erected a monument here in memory of honour of Christian martyrs killed by Muslims.

In 1691 the remains of the baths were accidentally uncovered during building work around the square. It's possible that at this time parts of the bathhouse's masonry, especially the vaulted ceilings, was reused for the construction of the Church of San Pedro de Alcántara to the north. The baths were covered up again and were not uncovered again until 1903, when they were accidentally discovered during gardening work in the square. At this point they were studied by Spanish historian Rafael Ramírez de Arellano, who dated them back to al-Hakam II's reign. The bath complex was then covered up yet again until 1961, when they were excavated and more thoroughly studied by archeologists Félix Hernández and Rafael Castejón between 1961 and 1964. This led to the site being declared a Cultural Heritage Property of Spain a few years later. Eventually, the remains were converted into a museum which opened in 2006.

== Architecture ==
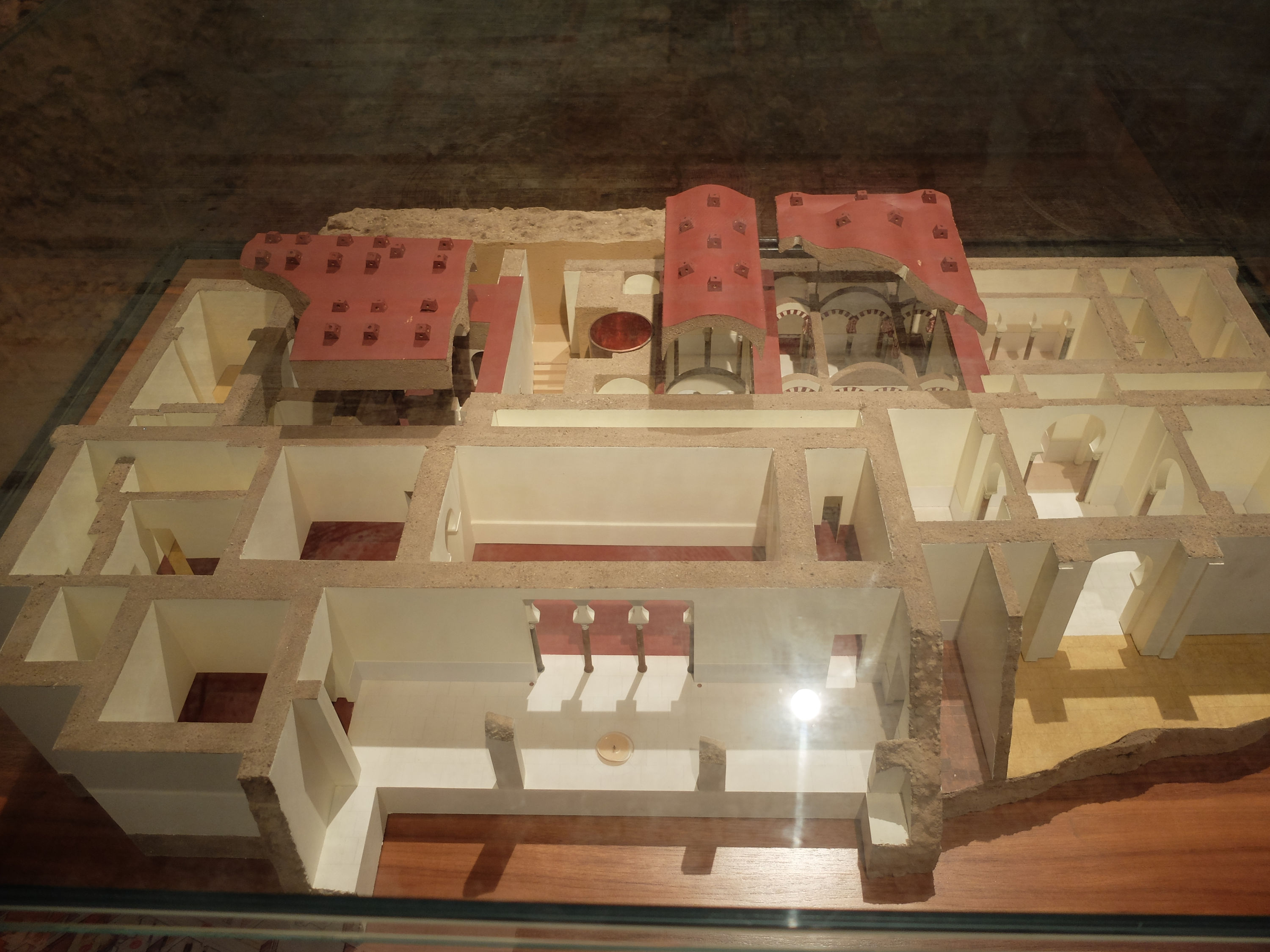
Model of the reconstructed baths, on display at the museum today

=== Entrance areas to the bath complex ===
The caliphal baths were entered from the south (the direction of the palace) and visitors first arrived at a large changing room (the bayt al-maslah or bayt al-maslakh), equivalent to the Roman apodyterium. By the Taifa period (11th century), the entrance was fronted by a sunken garden leading to a portico, which in turn led to a decorated reception hall built in this period. The garden was likely planted with orange trees, lemon trees, and myrtles, along with other plants. Water was brought to the baths from the aqueduct along the city walls and also stored in a cistern.

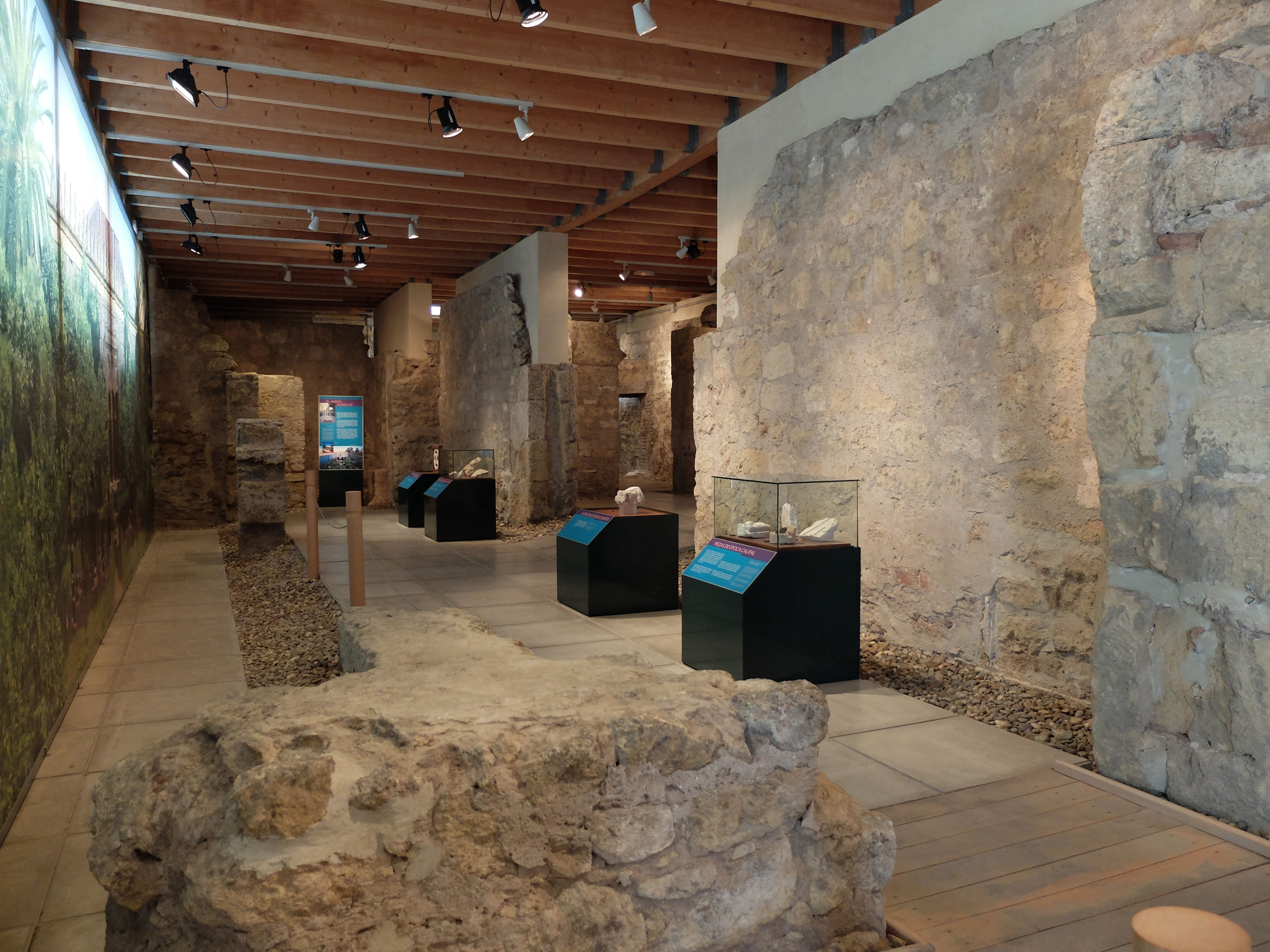
The area of the former portico entrance of the bath complex from the palace gardens

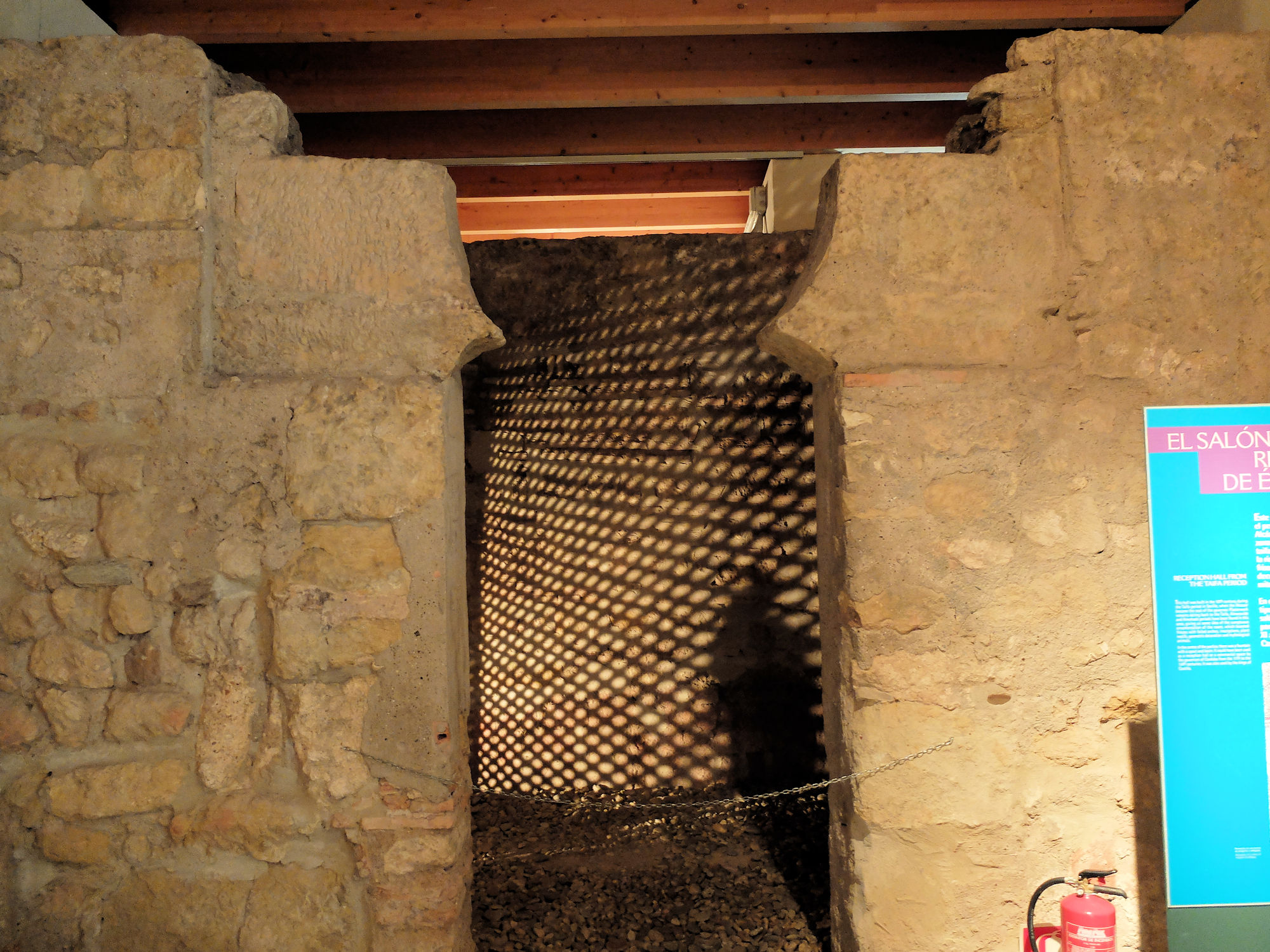
Remains of a former decorated horseshoe-arch gateway in the Taifa-period reception hall

=== Baths of the Umayyad Caliphate period ===
The original caliphal baths consisted of three main rooms arranged in sequence parallel to the changing room, from east to west: the cold room (bayt al-barid), the warm room (bayt al-wastani), and the hot room (bayt al-sajun). These corresponded, respectively, to the Roman equivalents of the frigidarium, tepidarium, and caldarium. Latrines were also accessible near the cold room, with underground running water washing away the waste. Bathers visited the cold room first, then moved progressively to the warm room and then the hot room, whose purpose was to induce perspiration as part of the cleaning or purification process. Visitors were also cleaned with vigorous rubbing and massaging by bathhouse staff. As was common to other Muslim hammams, and in contrast with other versions of steam baths, bathers did not actually immerse themselves in water but instead washed themselves at the end of the process by having warm water poured onto them.

In the caliphal baths, the largest room was the warm room (bayt al-wastani), occupying roughly 40% of the total area of the bathing rooms. This feature of the layout was also common to many other bathhouses in al-Andalus. It was covered by a large central vault ceiling surrounded by smaller barrel vault sections, all of which rested on marble columns with decorative capitals between horseshoe arches. The ceilings were pierced with small skylights, often star-shaped, in order to provide some lighting. The flooring and lower walls were also covered in marble, the upper walls were clad with some kind of steam-proof lining (like plaster), and the room featured some geometric decoration, though not much of this survives today. The smaller hot room to the west was a rectangular space covered by a barrel vault and marked at either end by a column between two horseshoe arches. On the west side of this, behind a marble lattice wall, was the service area of the baths which was set lower than the other rooms and contained the furnaces. These furnaces provided hot water for the steam rooms, and also generated hot air and smoke which was then channeled through pipes and conduits under the floors of the hot and warm rooms (similar to the Roman hypocaust system) before being evacuated through the walls and up to the chimneys.

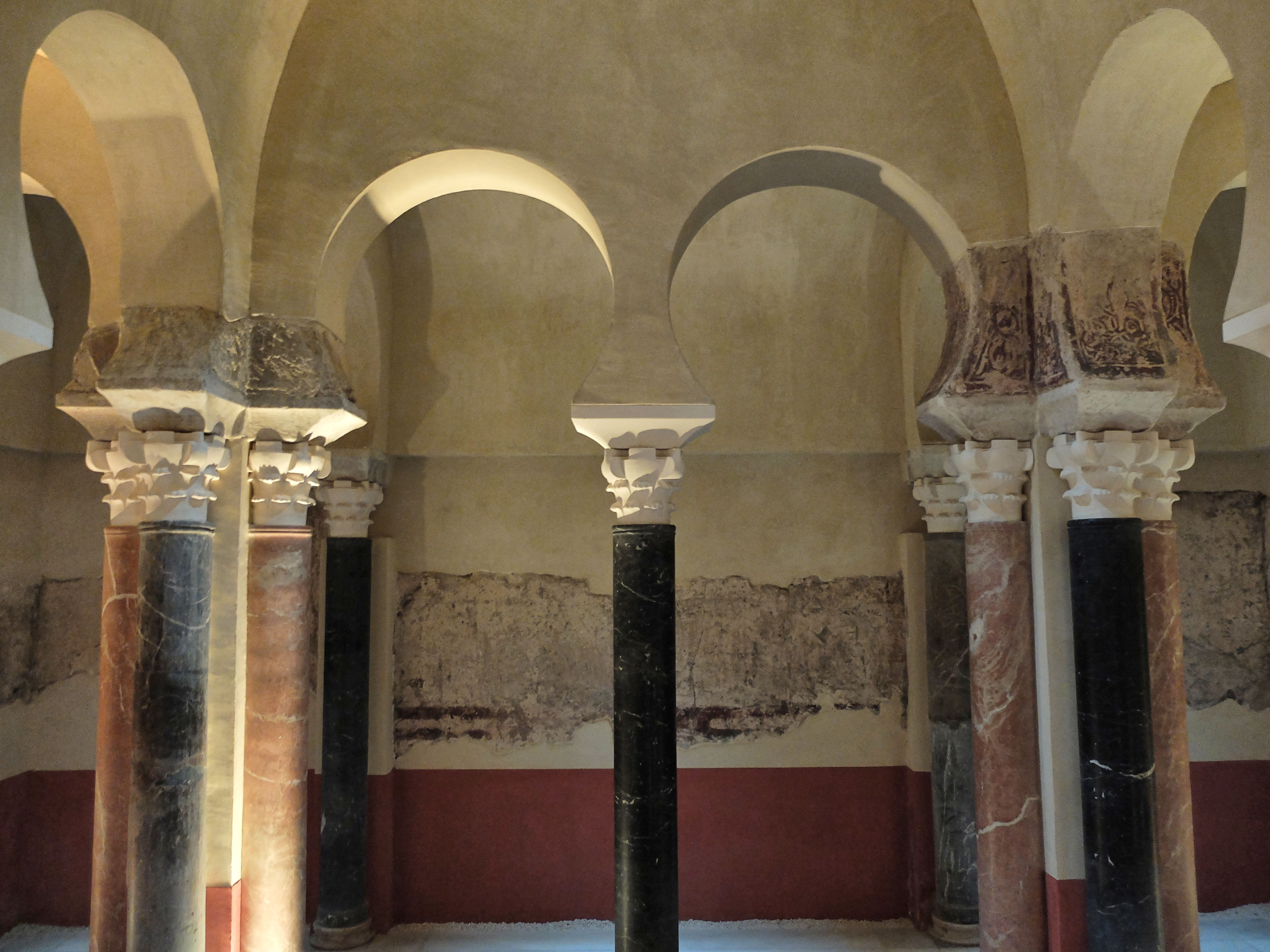
The reconstructed warm room (bayt al-wastani) of the caliphal baths

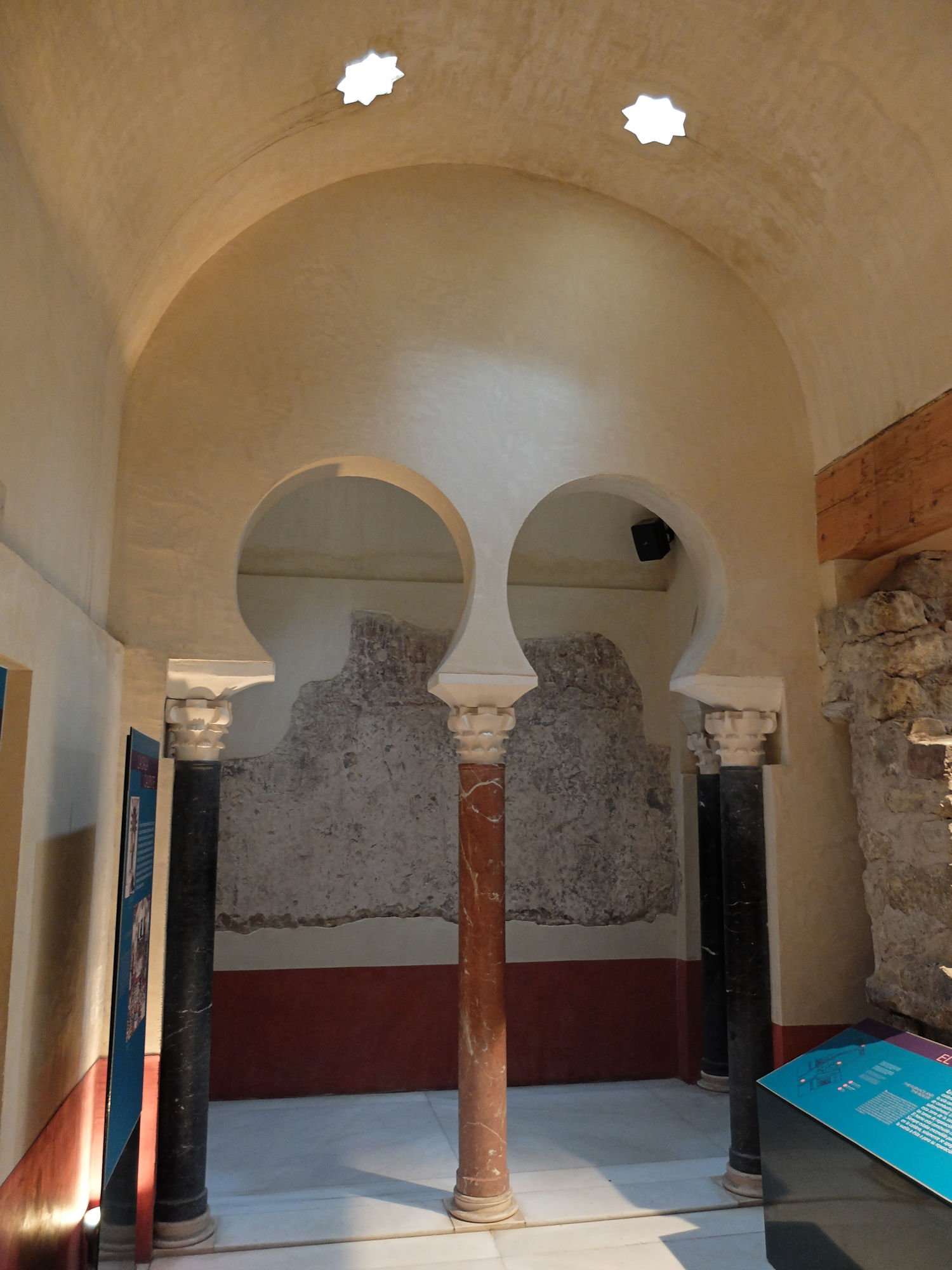
The hot room (bayt al-sajun) of the caliphal baths

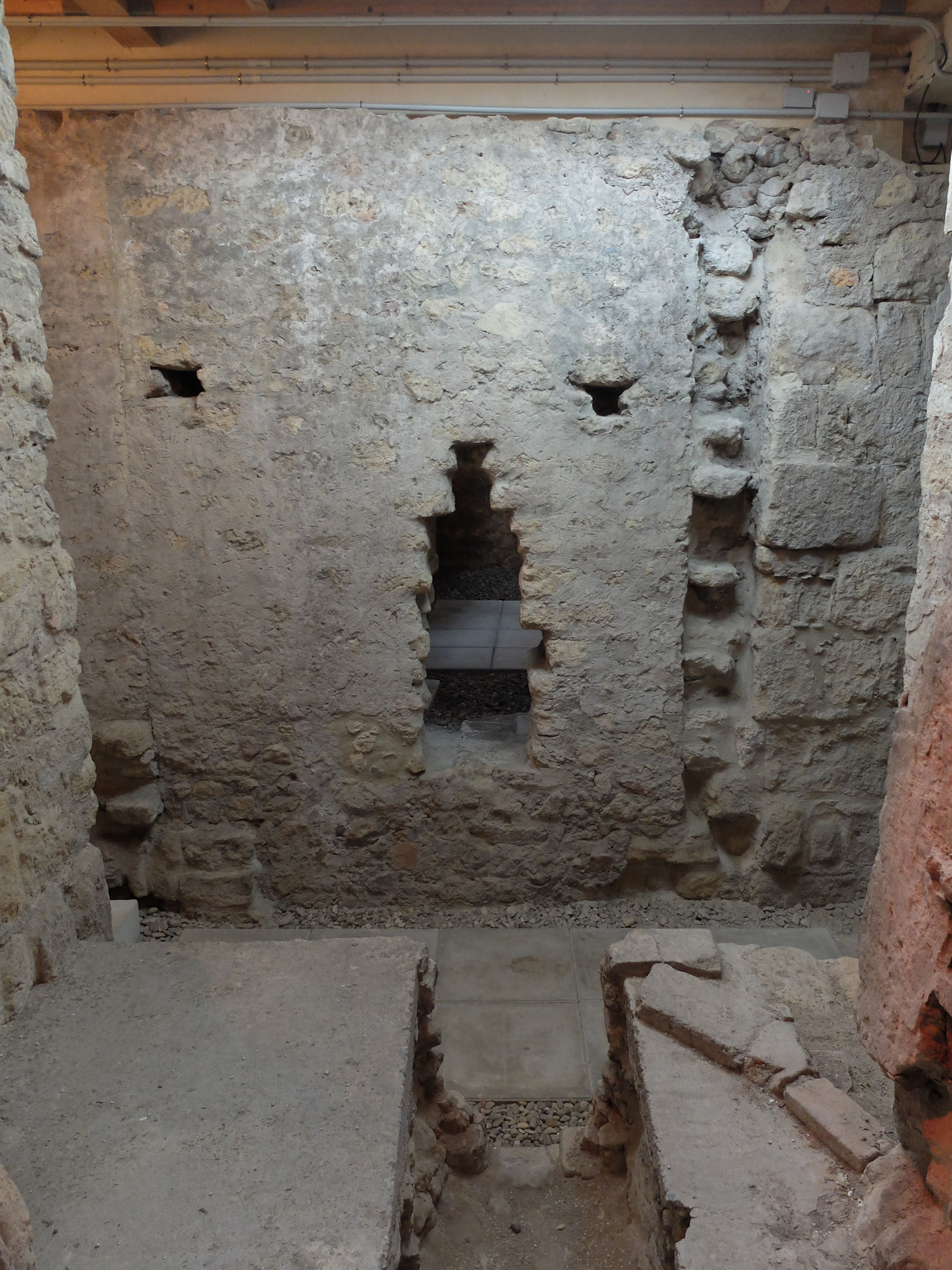
The service area or furnace room of the bath complex

=== Almohad-period baths ===
The Almohad-era bath was located to the west of the caliphal bath complex and consisted of a second set of cold, warm, and hot rooms, accessed from the Taifa-period reception hall. These occupied a smaller area than the original caliphal steam rooms and they reused the service area and furnaces of the original baths. The hot room here is of a very similar form to the hot room of the caliphal baths, but the warm room is much more modest than its caliphal counterpart. They also featured decorative plasterwork with floral and interlacing motifs, fragments of which have been preserved at the Archeological Museum of Cordoba.

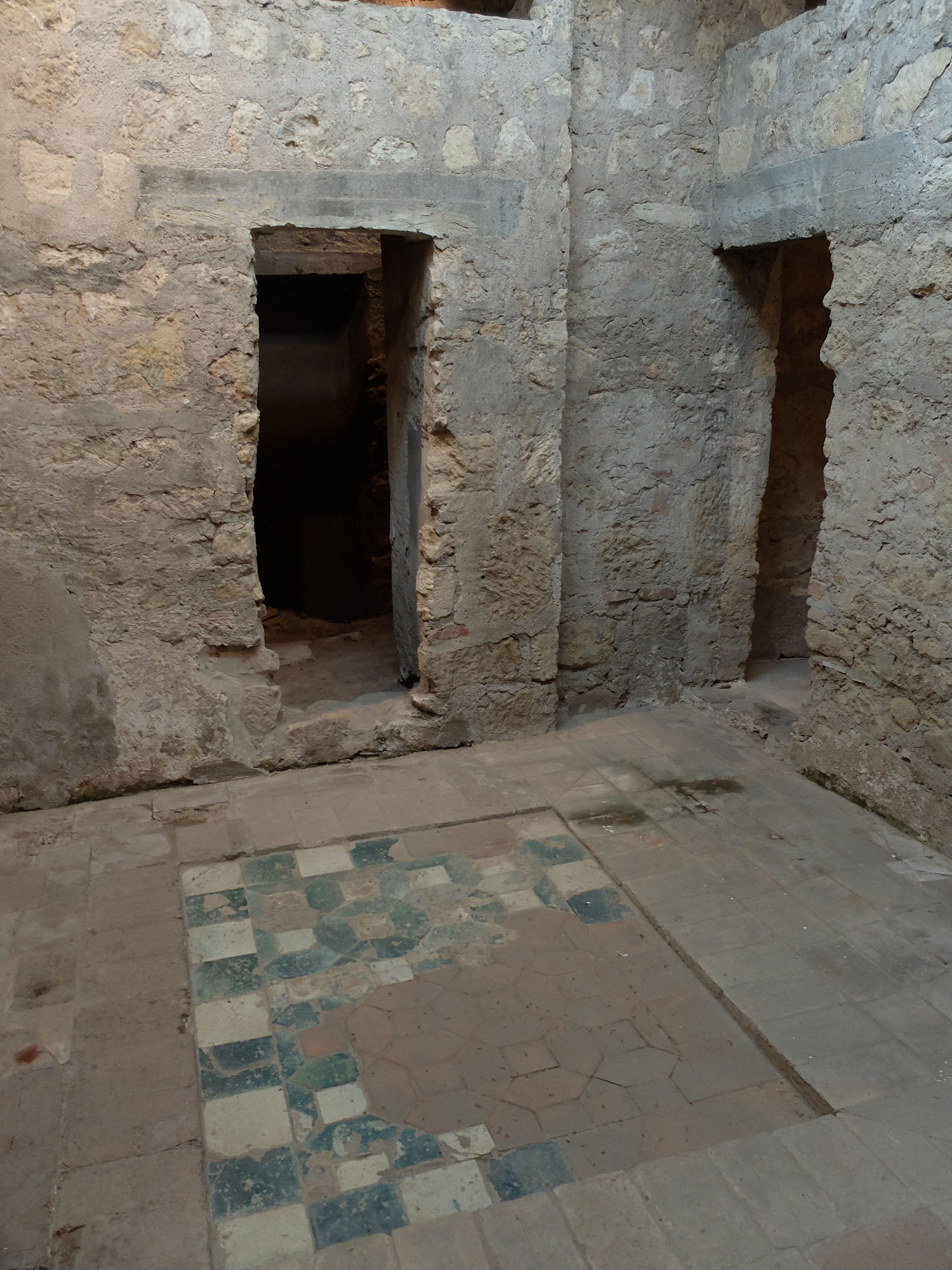
The cold room (bayt al-barid) of the Almohad baths

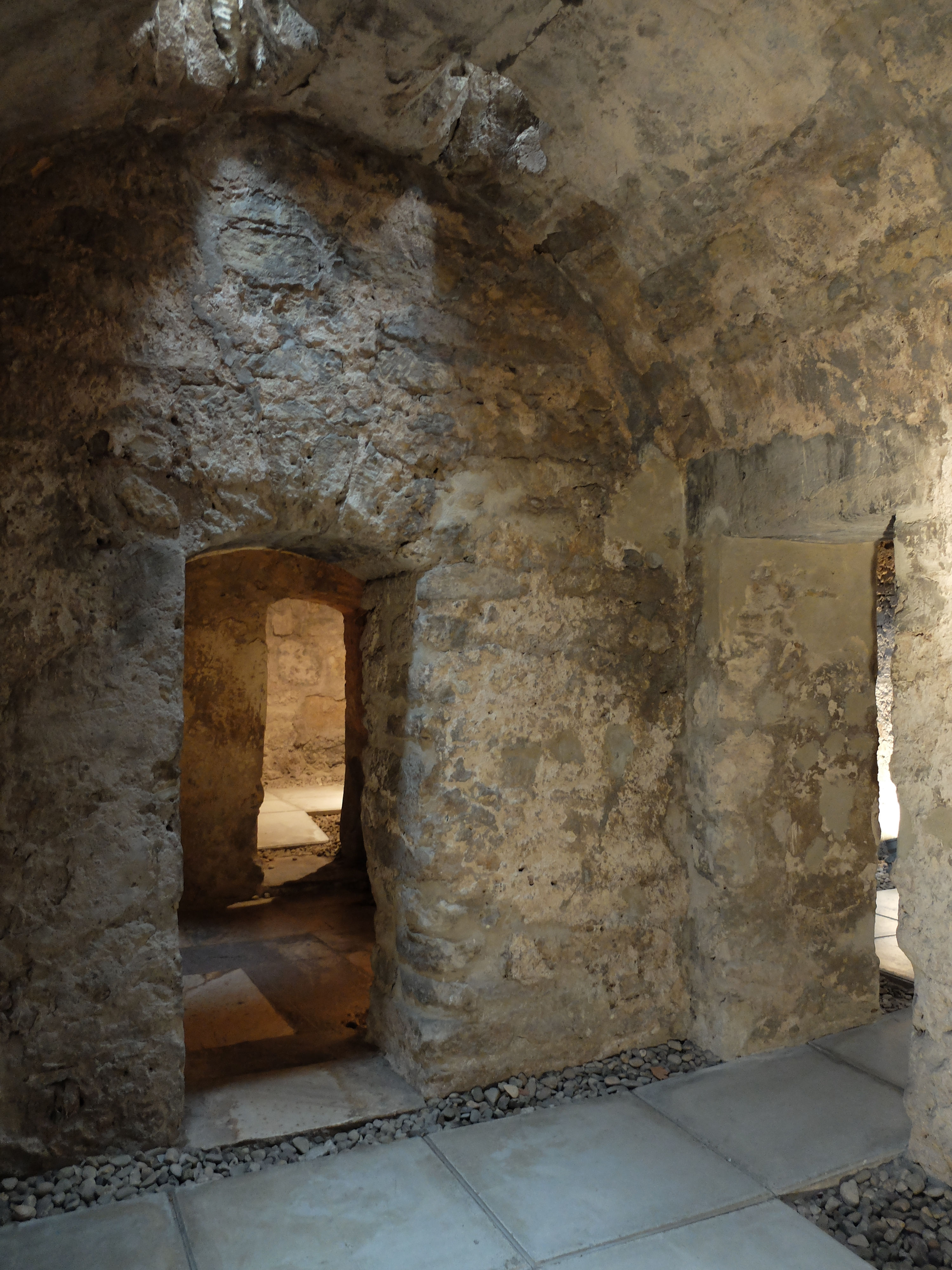
The warm room of the Almohad baths

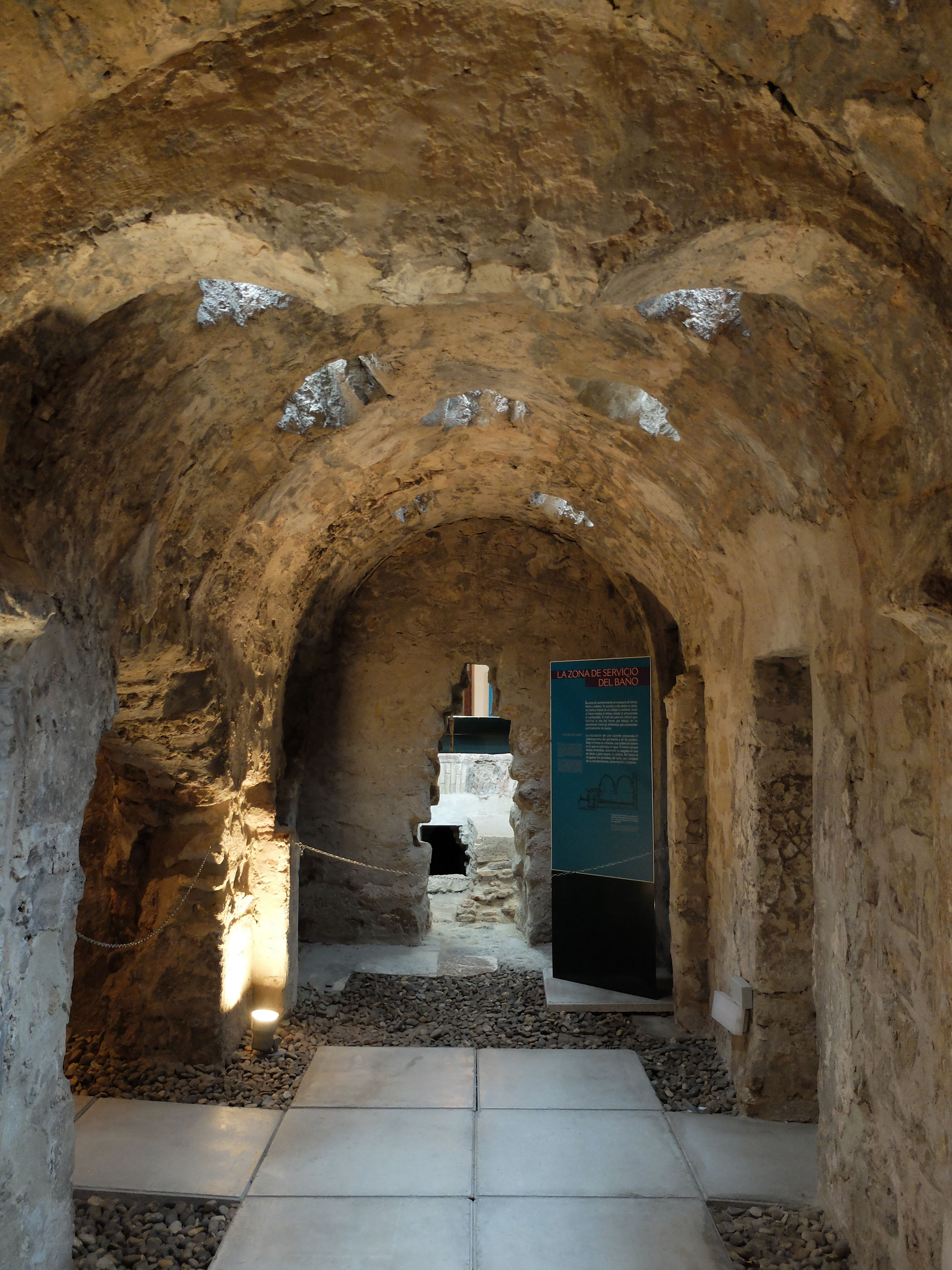
The hot room of the Almohad baths

== See also ==
- El Bañuelo
- Hammam Saffarin
- Qusayr 'Amra
- Wudu (common Islamic ablutions)
