= Alcázar of the Caliphs (Córdoba) =

Royal home now government owned in Spain, designed by prominent Alcazar architect family

Coordinates: 37°52′41.6″N 4°46′49.6″W

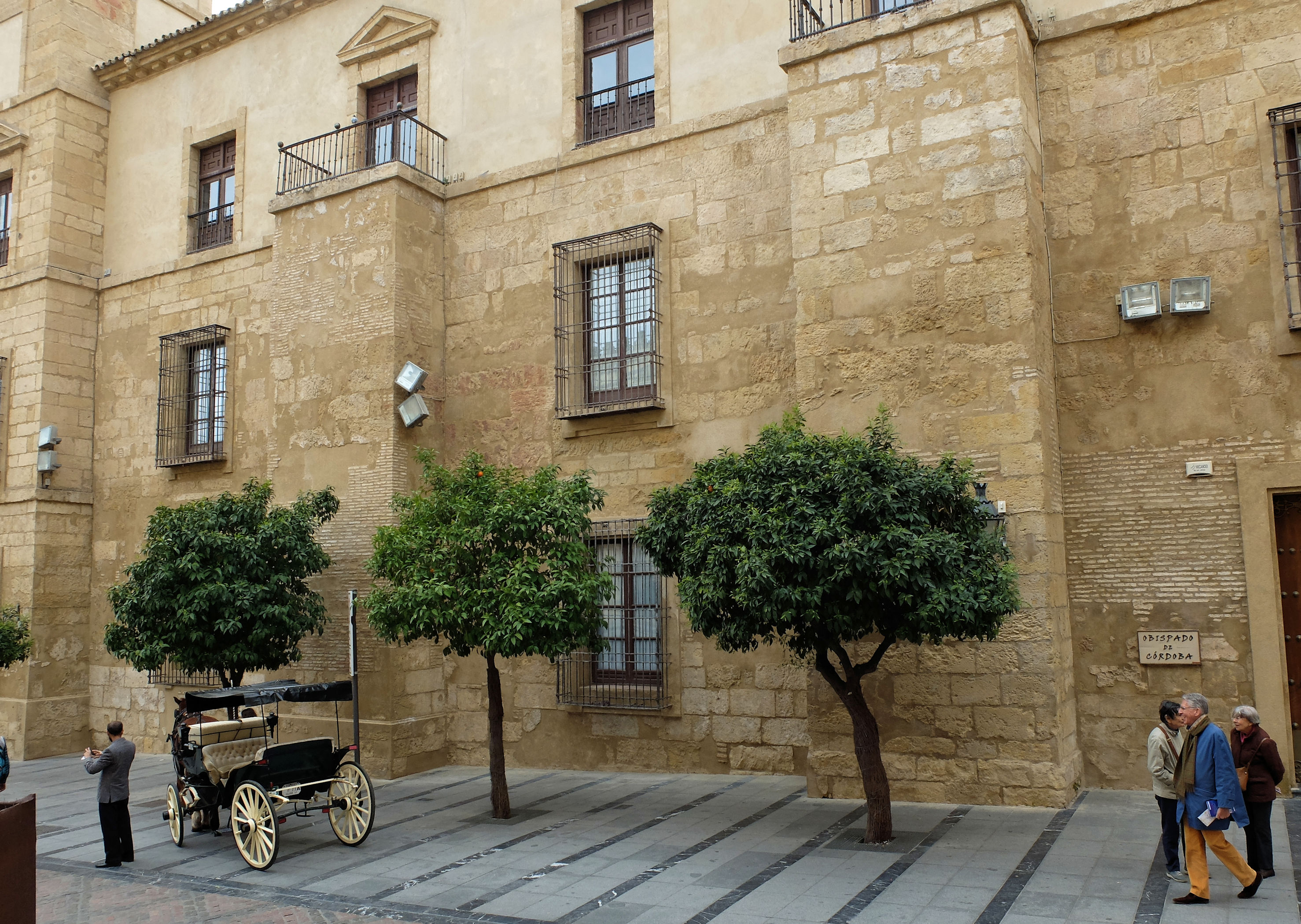
Remains of the outer wall of the Umayyad Alcazar incorporated into the façade of the Episcopal Palace today

The Alcázar of the Caliphs or Caliphal Alcázar, also known as the Umayyad Alcázar and the Andalusian Alcazar of Cordoba, was a fortress-palace (alcázar) located in Córdoba, in present-day Spain. It was the seat of the government of Al-Andalus and the residence of the emirs and caliphs of Córdoba from the 8th century until the 11th century and the residence of local Muslim governors from the 11th century until the Christian conquest in 1236. The site was composed of heterogeneous constructions ranging from the private residences of the rulers and their households to the government offices and administrative areas. Today, only minor remains of the palace have survived, including the Caliphal Baths which have been converted into a museum. The rest of the site is occupied by later structures including the Alcázar de los Reyes Cristianos, the Episcopal Palace, the Seminary of San Pelagio, and the Campo Santos de los Mártires public square.

== History ==
When the Visigoths fell to the Muslim conquest of Hispania in 711, marking the beginning of Al-Andalus, the governors appointed by the Umayyad Caliphate in Damascus established themselves initially in Seville. In 717 the governor, al-Ḥurr, moved the capital of al-Andalus to Cordoba, the former Visigothic capital, and moved into the former palace of the Visigothic king, known in Arabic sources as the Balāt al-Lūdriq. The palace was located near the Roman bridge as well as near the first mosque of the city (which was a Christian basilica being shared with the Muslim community).

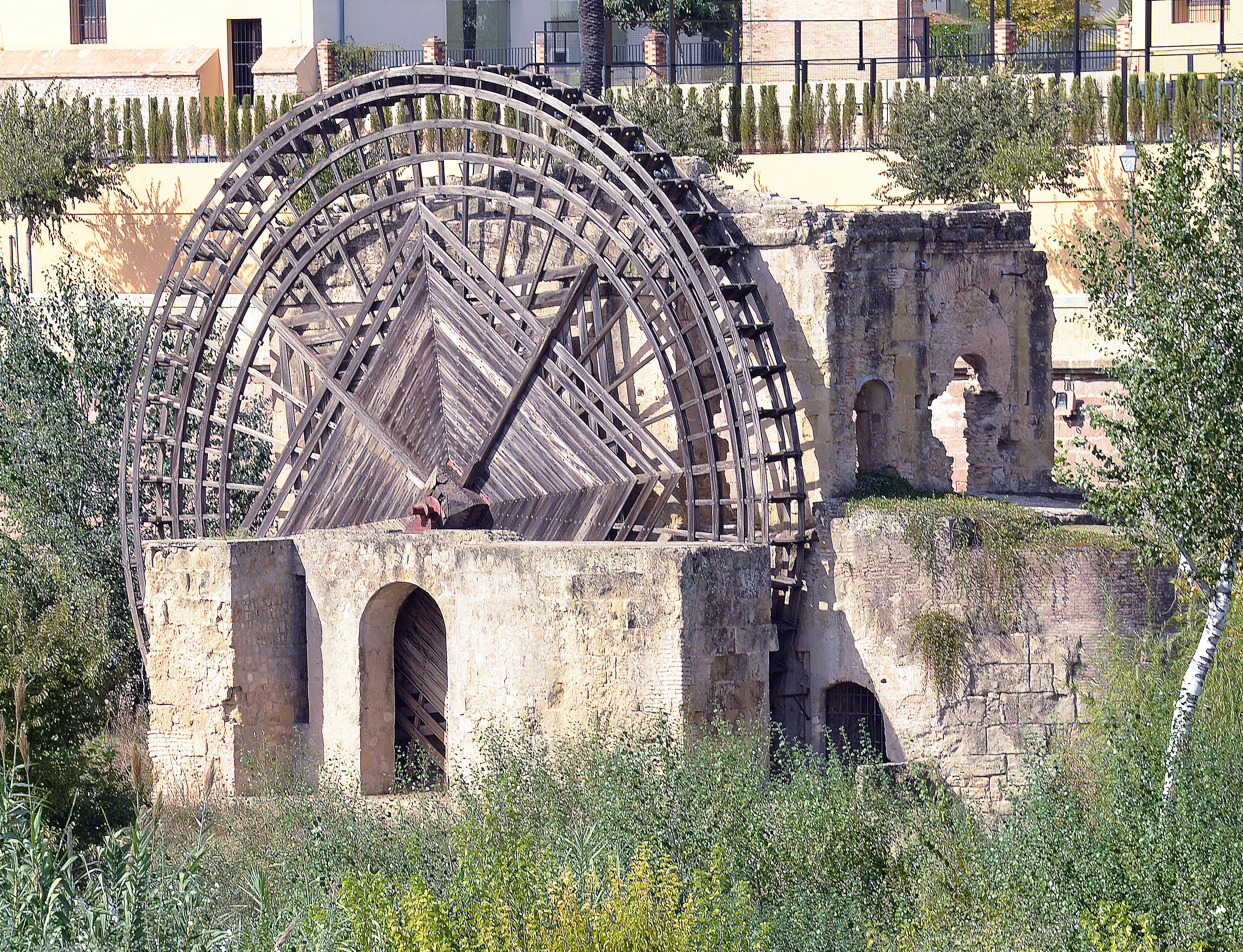
The Albolafia waterwheel on the banks of the Guadalquivir river, built to provide water to the Alcázar and its gardens

The Umayyads fell to the Abbasid Caliphate in 750 but the surviving member of the Umayyad Dynasty, Abd ar-Rahman I, fled to Córdoba and established an Umayyad Emirate over al-Andalus in 756. Abd ar-Rahman initially resided in several palace-villas on the outskirts of the city, most notably one called ar-Ruṣāfa. Ar-Ruṣāfa may have originally been a Roman villa or a Roman-Visigothic estate which was taken over and adapted by a Berber chieftain named Razin al-Burnusi who accompanied the original Muslim invasion by Tariq ibn Ziyad earlier that century. After a failed plot against him in 784, Abd ar-Rahman moved his residence definitively to the site of the palace in the city, which he transformed into the new Alcázar. A year later he also began construction of the Great Mosque next door.

Abd ar-Rahman I and his successors (who eventually declared a new Caliphate) built and continuously developed the Alcázar into the official royal residence and seat of power in Al-Andalus. During this period the city flourished as a key political and cultural center, and the Alcázar was expanded into a very large and widely used area with baths, gardens, and the largest library in Western Europe. Abd ar-Rahman II was responsible for improving the water supply for both the city and the palace gardens. He may have also built the Albolafia and other norias (waterwheels) along the Guadalquivir River. (Although the Albolafia is also attributed by historians to either the 10th century or to the 12th century under the Almoravids.) The palace complex was also equipped with a bathhouse (hammam), known today as the Caliphal Baths (Baños Califales), which dates from the reign of al-Hakam II and was later expanded under the Almohads (12th to early 13th century).

In the 10th century the official seat of government was moved to a new palace complex, Madinat al-Zahara, built by Caliph Abd ar-Rahman III outside the city. In spite of this move, the original Alcázar retained its importance. Abd-ar-Rahman III himself carried out many works here, building new water infrastructure as well as possibly the Dar al-Rawda or Garden House which, by its name, was probably located next to the Rawda cemetery and garden. Madinat al-Zahara was in turn ruined during the collapse of the caliphate in the early 11th century, causing the seat of power in Cordoba to return to the Alcázar, where local governors resided under later regimes. Following the Christian conquest of the city by Ferdinand III in 1236, one part of the Alcázar was donated to the bishop of Cordoba (today the Episcopal Palace) and converted into various structures, while a large part of it was transformed into the Alcazar of the Christian Kings, a royal residence of the Spanish monarchy. Few traces of the original Islamic-era palaces remains today.

== Description ==
=== Location and size ===
The palace complex covered a large area situated to the southwest of the Great Mosque, encompassing what is today the Alcázar de los Reyes Cristianos, the Episcopal Palace, the Seminary of San Pelagio, the Campo Santos de los Mártires public square (which now covers the Caliphal Baths), and other nearby buildings. The palace complex was surrounded by walls which enclosed an area of 39,000 square meters. The palaces were linked to the Great Mosque via a high covered passage (sabbat) which was raised over the street between them, allowing the caliph direct access to the maqsurah area of the mosque via a corridor behind the qibla wall. The first sabbat was built by the Umayyad emir Abdallah (reigned 888-912) for security reasons and was replaced by al-Hakam II when he expanded the mosque.

=== Gates ===
Of the configuration of the Alcázar we know only few details including the names of some of its renowned palaces and gardens thanks to historians like Ibn Idhari and Ibn Bashquwal (also reported by later historians like al-Maqqari). According to Ibn Idhari there were two gates in its walls: Bab al-Hadid ("Iron Gate") and Bab al-Sudda ("Gate of the Embankment"). Bab al-Sudda was the southern gate, facing the river, and was the main gate of the palace. It was fronted by a public square where executions and military parades took place. The gate itself included a balcony or platform (called a saṭḥ) from which Caliph Abd ar-Rahman III could observe the events. The heads of executed enemies were also hung here on display and a prison stood nearby. The "Iron Gate" (Bab al-Hadid), located to the north, was supposedly named because its door knockers were notably looted from one of the gates of Narbonne (briefly occupied by Muslims in the early 8th century).

Ibn Bashquwal names at least three additional gates: Bab el-Jinan ("Gate of the Garden"), Bab al-Quriya or Bab al-Qariya ("Village Gate"), and Bab al-Jami' ("Gate of the Mosque"). Bab al-Jinan was another southern gate, above which a reception pavilion was built which gave views over the river. Bab al-Jami' was a gate near the sabbat passage, facing the mosque. A number of other gate names are also attested which historians have attempted to locate. These include Bab al-'Adil ("Gate of Justice"), Bab al-Wadi ("Gate of the River"), Bab al-Ishbiliya ("Gate of Seville"), Bab al-Siba' ("Gate of the Lion"), Bab al-Asad, and Bab al-Hammam ("Gate of the Bathhouse"). Bab al-'Adil, a gate located at the southeast corner of the palaces (near the mosque), was known as the Gate of Justice because this is where citizens would present their petitions to the emir and the latter would dispense justice. Bab al-Hammam, as its name suggests, was located near the Caliphal Baths (or hammam) to the north. Bab al-Ishbiliya, as its name also implies, was located to the east (facing Seville), as was Bab al-Siba'.

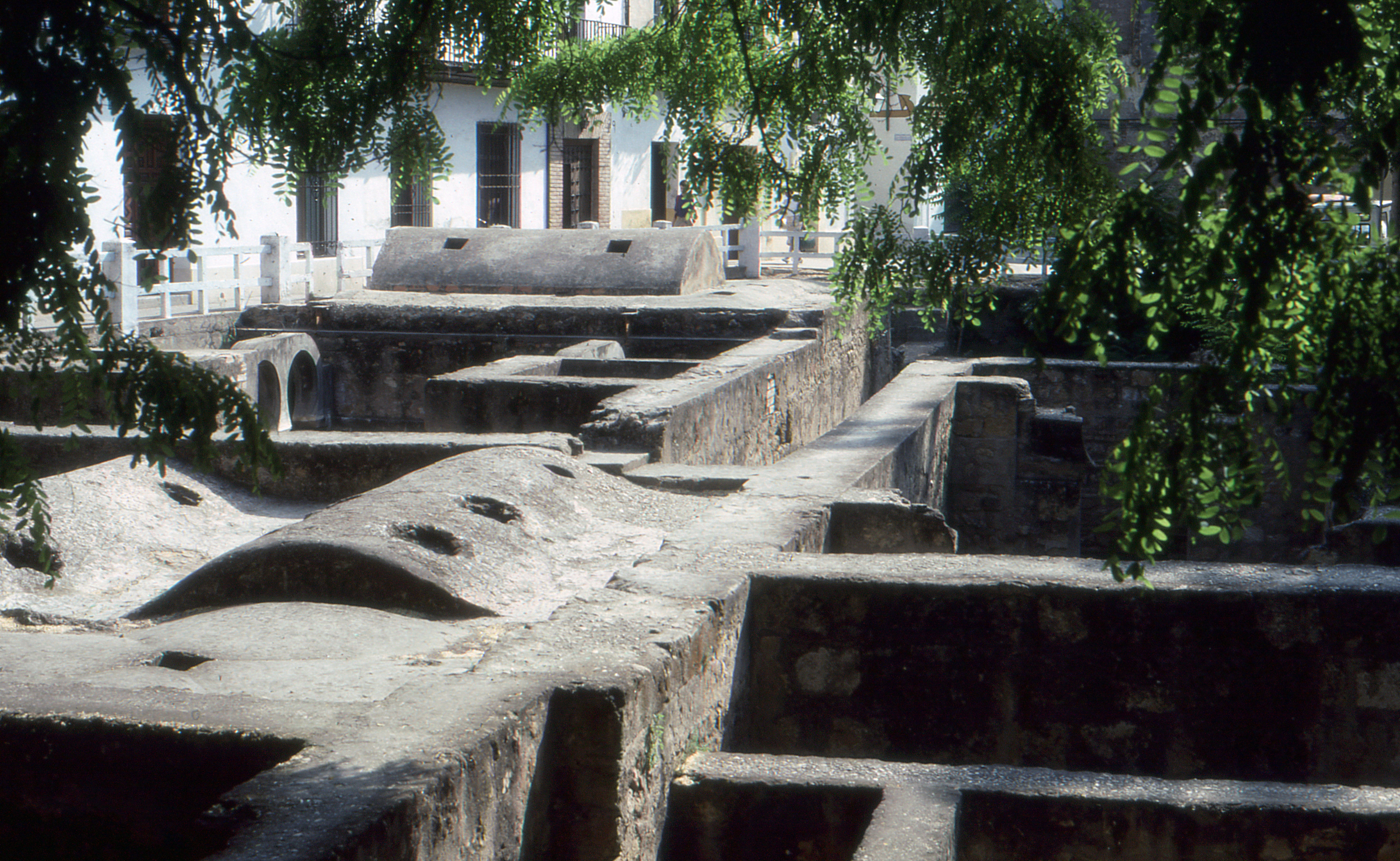
The uncovered remains of the Caliphal Baths complex at the Campo Santos de los Mártires (photo from the 1990s, before the baths were converted to a museum)

=== Interior layout ===
Inside the walls, the layout of the Alcazar is only roughly known, with more information available about its arrangement during the emirate period than during the caliphal period. There were numerous structures and pavilions which housed the residences of the rulers as well as the offices of the state's administration. The Dar al-Wuzara ("House of the Viziers" or "House of the Ministries") was an official building located near Bab al-Sudda. The main audience hall or throne room, the Majlis al-Kamil (roughly, "Perfect Hall"), was located nearby. The grounds also included extensive gardens, of which one was the Rawda, the royal cemetery or necropolis, located near the Bab al-Jinan ("Gate of the Garden"). This garden was encompassed by the Dar al-Rawda ("Garden Palace") a palace built by Abd ar-Rahman I (if not by Abd ar-Rahman III). The emirs and caliphs buried here included Abd ar-Rahman I (d. 788), Hisham I (d. 796), Al-Hakam I (d. 822), Abd ar-Rahman II (d. 852), Muhammad I (d. 886), Abdallah (d. 912), Abd ar-Rahman III (d. 961), and the Hammudid caliph 'Ali (d. 1018). On the north side of the Dar al-Rawda was another hall or pavilion known as the Majlis al-Zahir ("Luminous Hall"). Lastly, the other notable buildings included the Caliphal Baths and a famous library, both created by al-Hakam II. The baths were located in the northwest area of the palace complex, near the private apartments of the emirs and caliphs whom they served. Other service-oriented structures and areas were also located near here.

== Current status ==
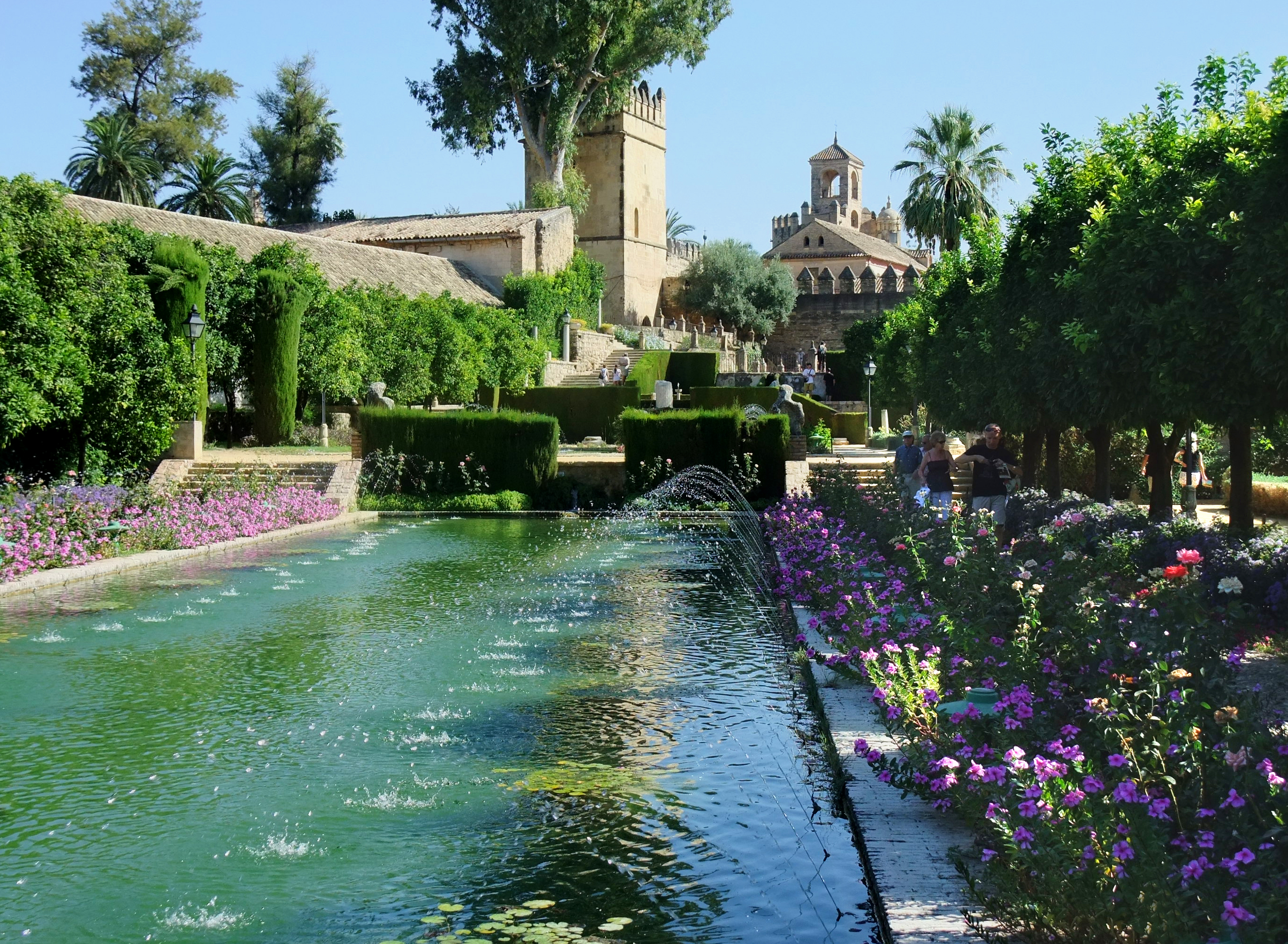
The gardens and castle of the Alcazar of the Christian Kings today

After the Christian conquest, the complex lost its function as the center of political power and was transformed for other uses. One part of it became a religious center with the construction of the Episcopal Palace, taking advantage of the remains of the walls of the alcázar which can be seen integrated into the facade of the palace itself today, as well as part of the walls of the adjoining Palacio de los Congresos. A larger part of the site was converted into the Alcazar of the Christian Kings, still present today and accessible to visitors.

In addition to these remains, the only thing that is conserved of the alcázar are its baths, called Caliphal Baths, located in Campo Santo de los Mártires. As for the sabbat, it disappeared after the disappearance of the alcázar itself; however, it is still possible to see on the western facade of the mosque - almost on the corner with the north facade - a small door that gave access to the corridor behind the qibla wall.
