= Alcázar de los Reyes Cristianos =

Royal castle and historic site in Spain

Alcázar of the Christian Monarchs
- Alcázar de los Reyes Cristianos (Spanish)
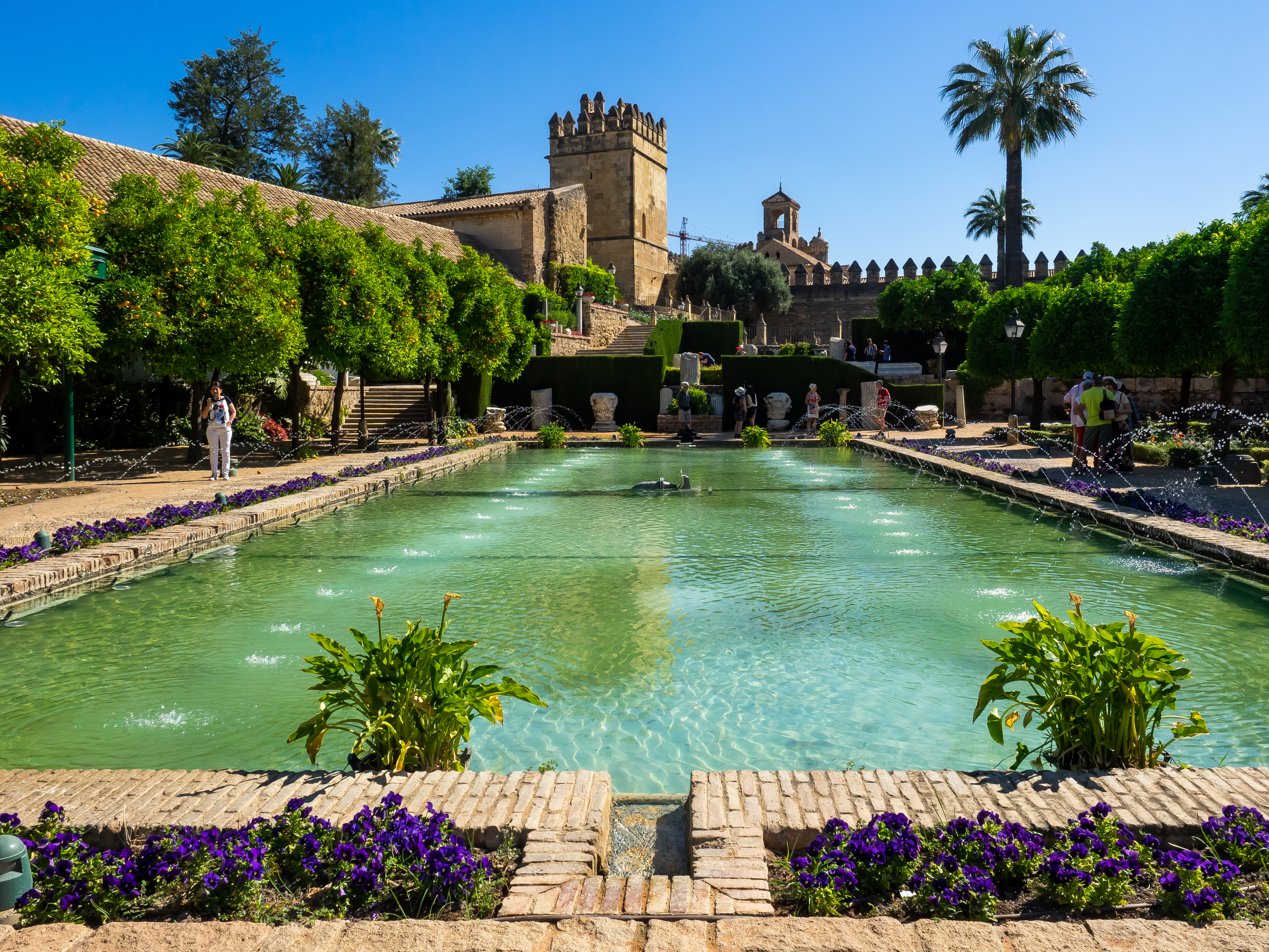
- The "torre del Homenaje" and the "torre de los Leones", view from the gardens
- Interactive map of Alcázar of the Christian Monarchs
- 37°52′38″N 4°46′55″W
- Type: Alcázar (castle/palace)
- Location: Cordoba, Spain

History
- Built: 1328 AD (on the site of earlier structures)

Site notes
- Architectural styles: Spanish, Spanish Gothic

UNESCO World Heritage Site
- Type: Cultural:
- Criteria: i, ii, iii, iv
- Designated: 1984
- Part of: Historic Centre of Cordoba
- Reference no.: 313
- Region: Europe

The Alcázar de los Reyes Cristianos (Spanish for "Castle of the Christian Monarchs"), also known as the Alcázar of Córdoba, is a medieval alcázar (Arabic: القصر, romanized: Al-Qasr, lit. 'The Palace') located in the historic centre of Córdoba (in Andalusia, Spain), next to the Guadalquivir River and near the Mosque-Cathedral. The fortress served as one of the primary residences of Isabella I of Castile and Ferdinand II of Aragon.

It is a building of military character whose construction was ordered by the King Alfonso XI of Castile in the year 1328, on previous constructions (the Islamic-era Umayyad Alcázar, also the previous residence of the Roman Governor and the Customs). The architectural ensemble has a sober character in its exterior and splendid in its interior, with the magnificent gardens and courtyards that maintain a Mudéjar inspiration.

The Alcázar has been declared a Cultural Interest Heritage since 1931. It forms part of the Historic Center of Córdoba that was declared a World Heritage Site by UNESCO in 1994.

== History ==
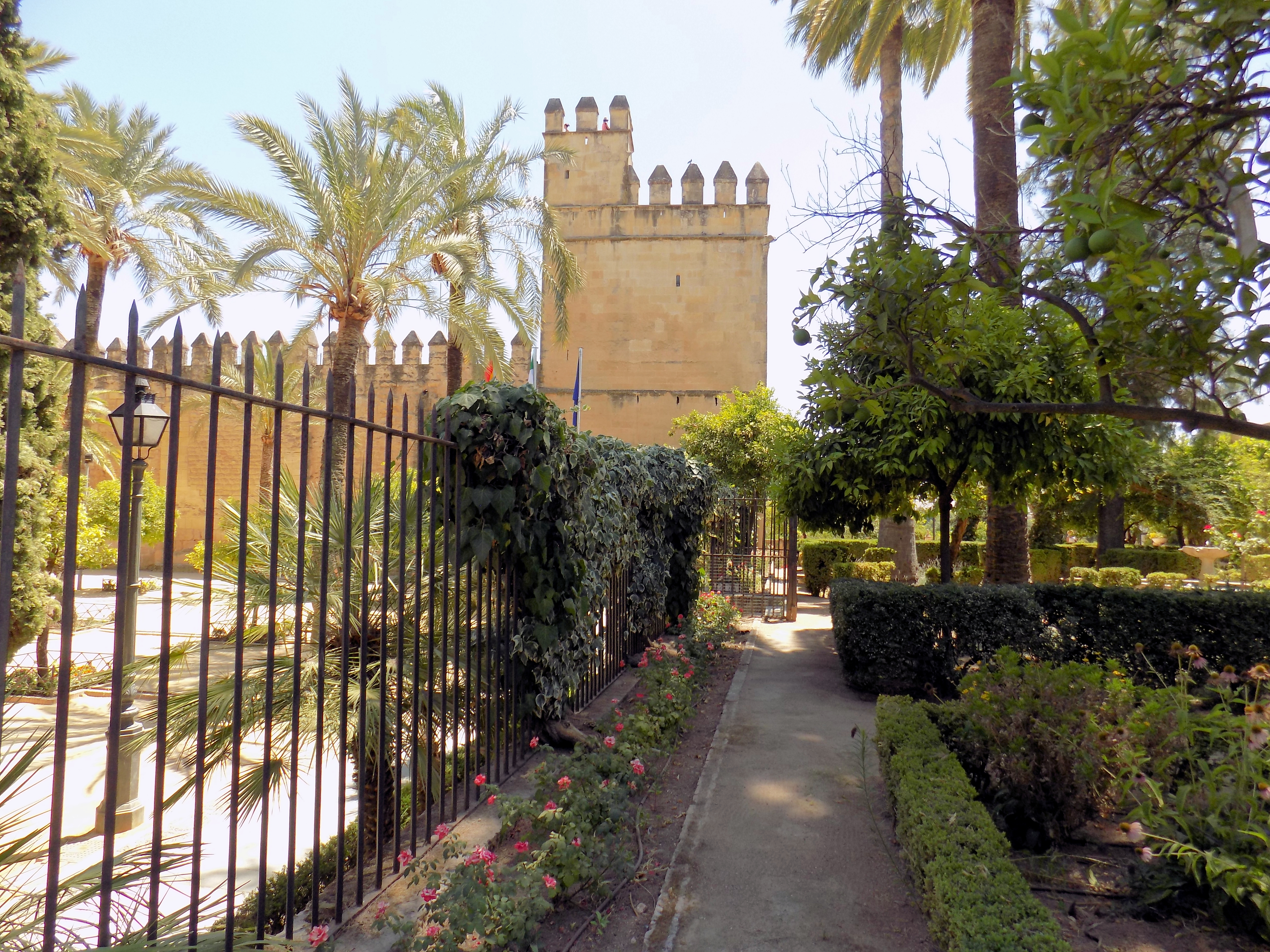
The Alcázar

In early medieval times, the site was occupied by a Visigothic fortress. When the Visigoths fell to the Umayyad conquest of Hispania and the beginning of Al-Andalus, the governors appointed by the Umayyad Caliphate in Damascus established themselves in the same area. The Umayyads fell to the Abbasid Caliphate and the surviving member of the Umayyad Dynasty, Abd ar-Rahman I, fled to Córdoba and established the Umayyad Emirate. Abd ar-Rahman I and his successors, who eventually created the independent Caliphate of Córdoba, were responsible for the construction of the Alcázar which became the official residence and seat of power of Al-Andalus. The city subsequently flourished as a key political and cultural center, and the Alcázar was expanded into a very large and widely used area with baths, gardens, and the largest library in the West. Watermills on the nearby Guadalquivir powered water lifting to irrigate the extensive gardens. The palace complex was also equipped with a bathhouse (hammam), known today as the Caliphal Baths (Baños Califales), which dates from the reign of al-Hakam II and was later expanded under the Almohads (12th to early 13th century). In the 10th century the official seat of government was moved to the site of Madinat al-Zahara outside the city, but this site was in turn ruined during the collapse of the caliphate in the early 11th century, causing the local seat of government to return to the Alcázar.

In 1236, Christian forces took Córdoba during the Reconquista. In 1328, Alfonso XI of Castile began building the present day structure on part of the site for the old fortress. Other parts of the Moorish Alcázar had been given as spoils to the bishop, nobles, and the Order of Calatrava. Alfonso's structure retained only part of the Moorish ruins but the structure appears Islamic due to Alfonso's use of the Mudéjar style.

The Alcázar was involved in the civil war where Henry IV of Castile faced a rebellion that backed his teenage half-brother Alfonso the Innocent. During the war, the Alcázar's defenses were upgraded to deal with the advent of gunpowder. At the same time, the Alcázar's main tower, now known as the "Tower of the Inquisition" was constructed.

Henry's successor, Isabella and her husband Ferdinand, used the Alcázar for one of the first permanent tribunals of the Spanish Inquisition and as a headquarters for their campaign against the Nasrid dynasty in Granada, the last remaining Moorish kingdom in the Iberian Peninsula. The Inquisition began using the Alcázar as one of its headquarters in 1482, converting much of it, including the Arab baths, into torture and interrogation chambers. The Inquisition maintained a tribunal here for three centuries. Boabdil was held prisoner here in 1483 until he promised to make Granada a tributary state. In 1486 or 1487, (Note: There is some disagreement among historians as to whether the meeting took place in 1486 or 1487, based on different readings of historical sources. As the Spanish royal court travelled regularly between the cities, the location of the meeting may have been different depending on the exact date, but Cordoba is most likely location according to the sources cited here.) Christopher Columbus had his first audience here with the Catholic Monarchs (Isabella and Ferdinand) to solicit support for his expedition to find a western sea route to Asia. The monarchs retained his service by placing him on their payroll, but did not endorse his expedition until after the conquest of Granada in 1492.

The Alcázar served as a garrison for Napoleon Bonaparte's troops in 1810. In 1821, the Alcázar became a prison. Finally, the Spanish government made the Alcázar a tourist attraction and national monument in the 1950s. The Alcázar's grand gardens, in their current form, also date from the mid-20th century.

== Exterior ==
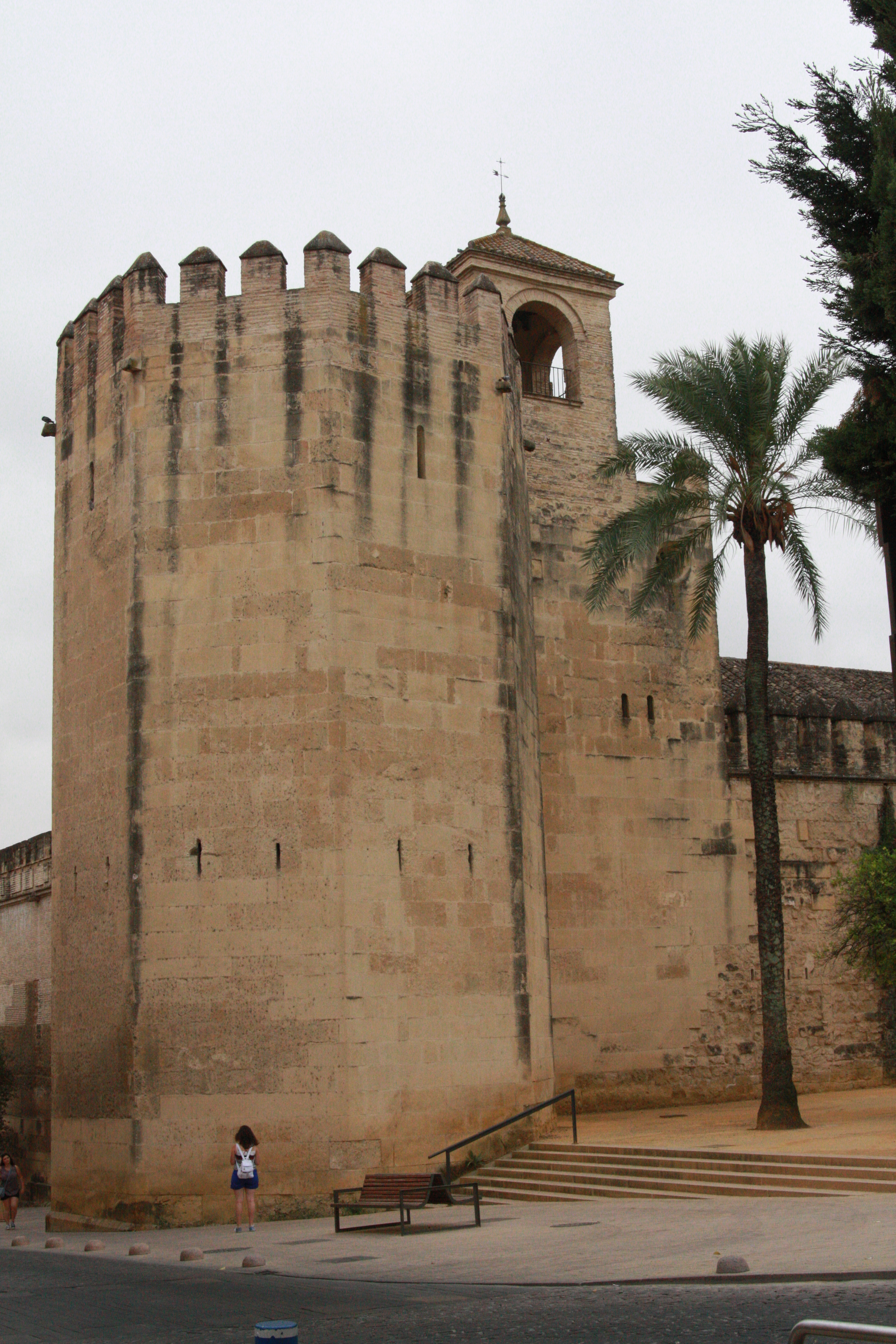
Tower of Homage

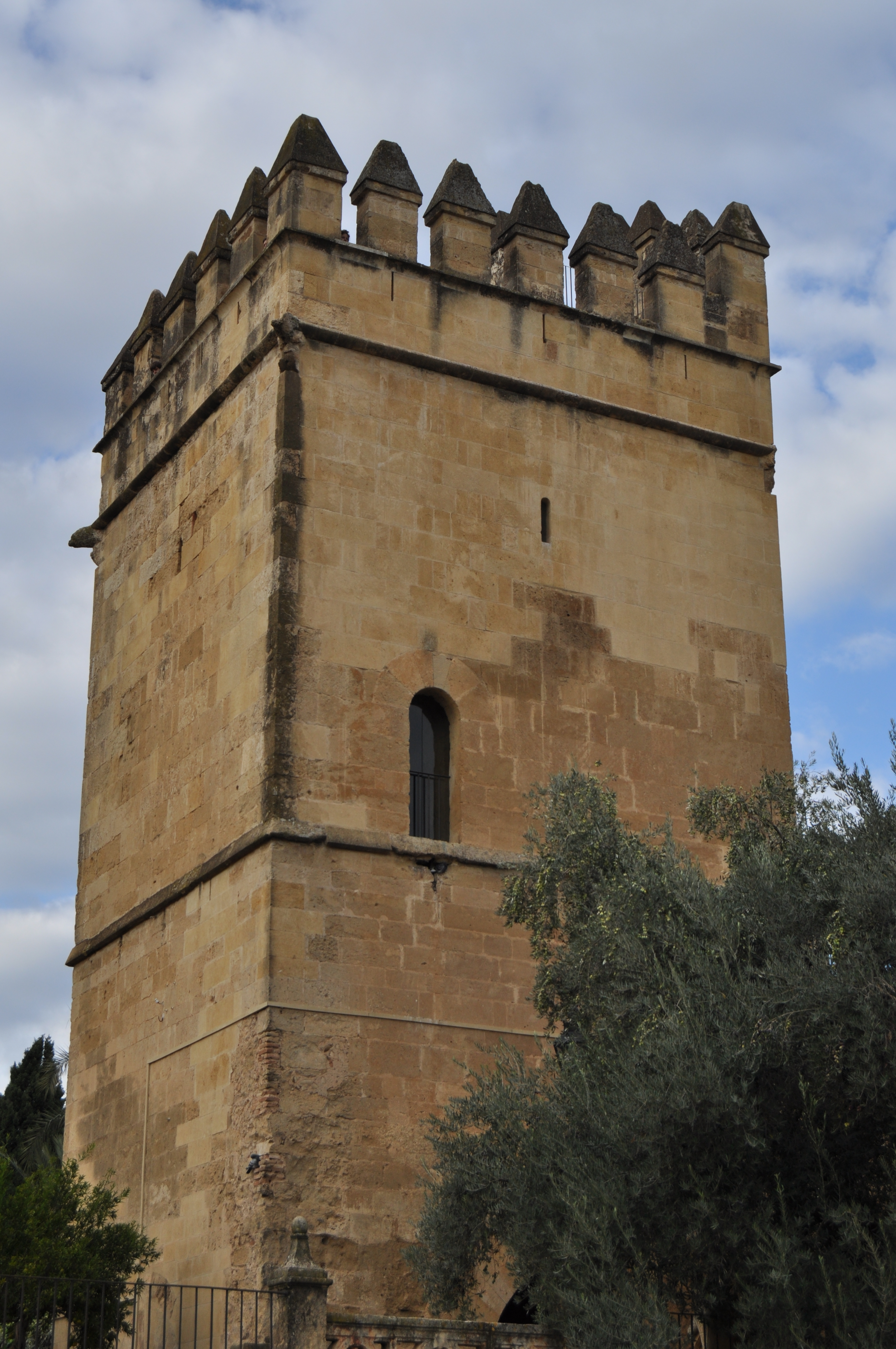
Tower of the Lions

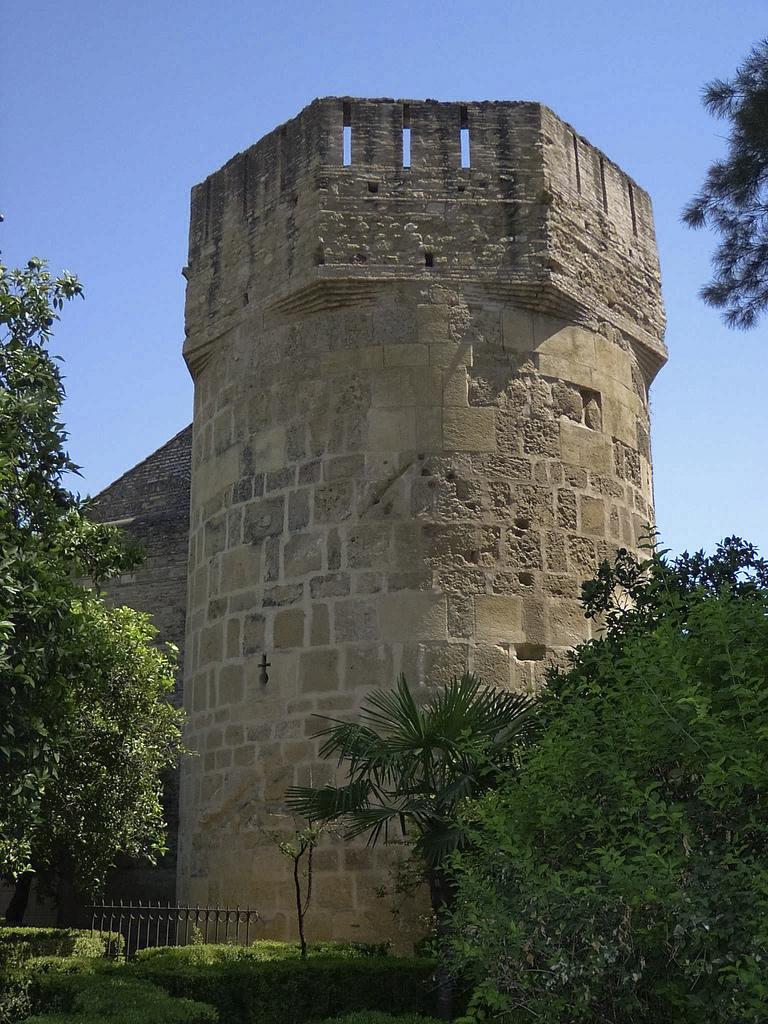
Tower of the Inquisition

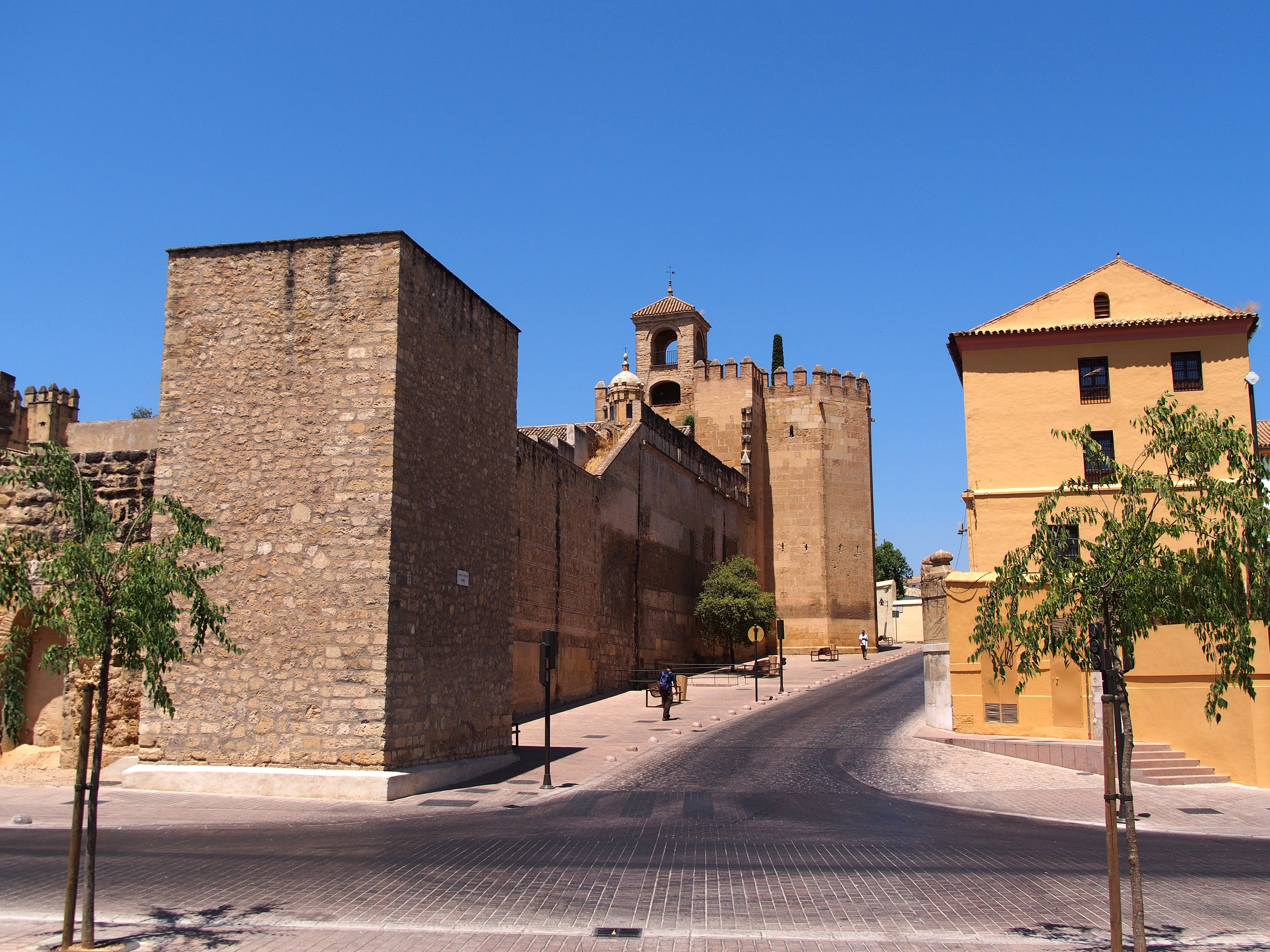
Tower of the Dove (left)

=== Towers ===
The outdoor area of the Alcázar is situated within the walls of the four towers (Paloma, Leones, Homenaje and Inquisición), this creating an almost square shape to the building.

- Tower of Homage (La torre del Homenaje), of octagonal shape, is situated in the Northeast corner. The tower was previously known as ‘The Clock Tower’ (Torre del Reloj), owing its name to the clock that was previously housed within. The interior has Gothic features including an ogival ceiling.
- Tower of the Lions (La torre de los Leones), of square shape, is situated in the Northwest corner. The door to the base of this tower is currently used as the visitor entrance to the Alcázar. It is the longest standing tower, dating back to the 13th Century, and is named after gargoyles in the shape of lions which are found on the uppermost section of the tower. Within the tower there are two floors; the ground floor, where the reception can be found, and the upper level which accommodates the Chapel of San Eustaquio (La capilla de San Eustaquio), which served as the chapel to the Catholic Monarchs.
- Tower of the inquisition (La torre de la Inquisición), of circular shape, is situated in the Southwest corner. It receives its name from the fact that, for centuries, it housed the archives of the Tribunal of the Holy Inquisition (Tribunal de la Santa Inquisition). It was also known as the ‘Tower of the Gardens’ (Torre de los Jardines’).
- Tower of the Dove (La torre de la Paloma), of square shape, is situated in the Southeast corner. The original tower was demolished in the mid-19th century, the current tower being a reconstruction which dates back to the second half of the 20th century. It was also known as ‘The Watch Tower’ (Torre de la Vela).

== Interior ==
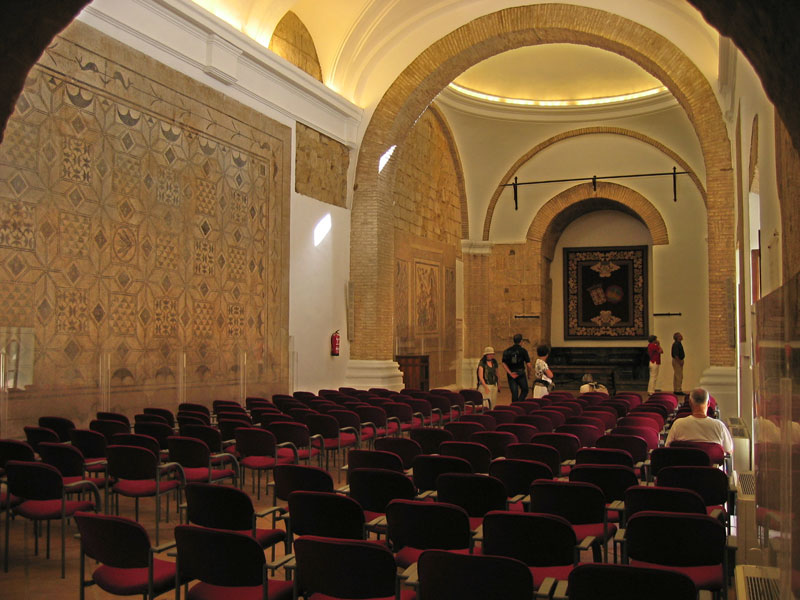
Hall of Mosaics

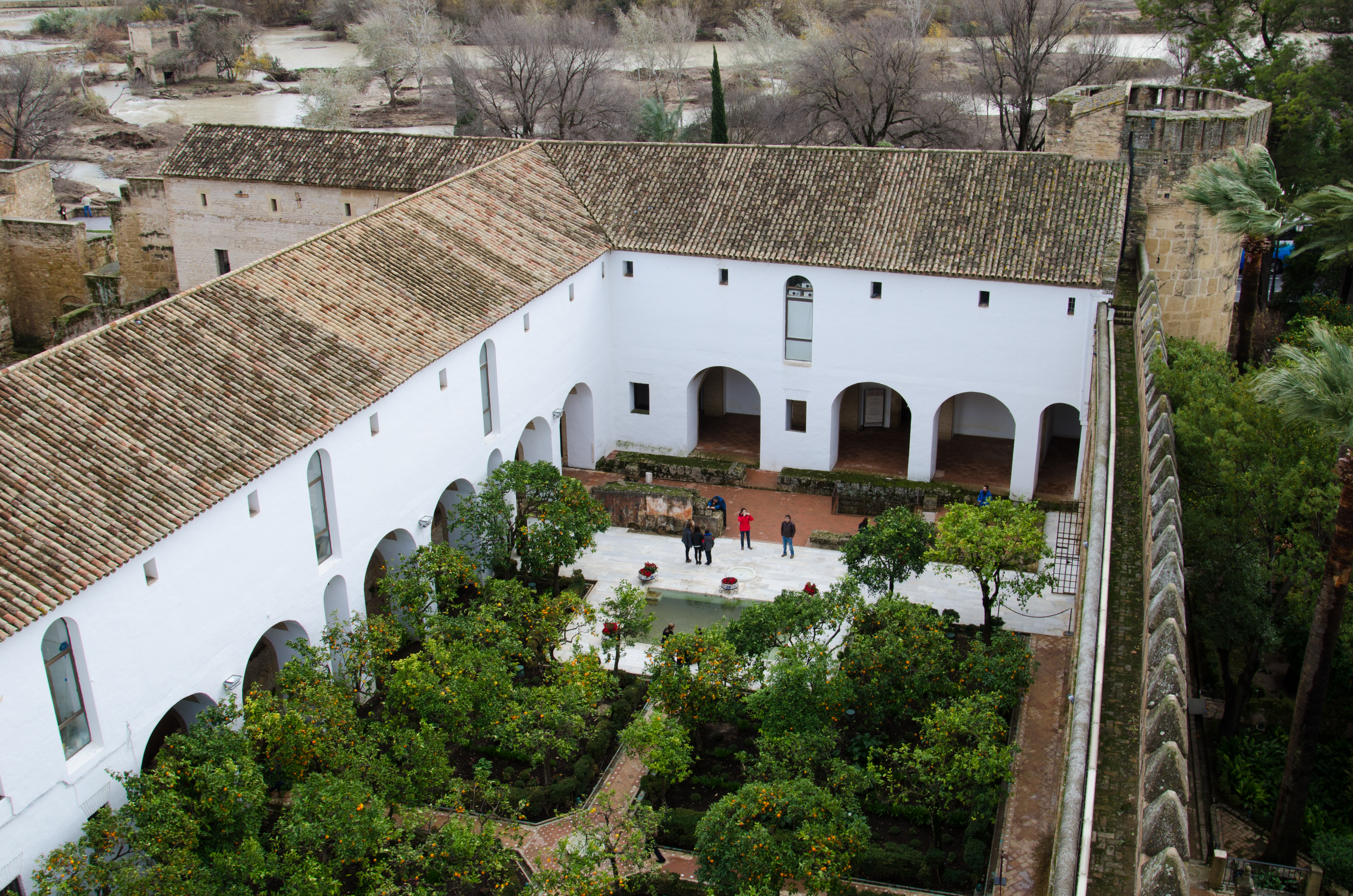
Courtyard of the Moriscos

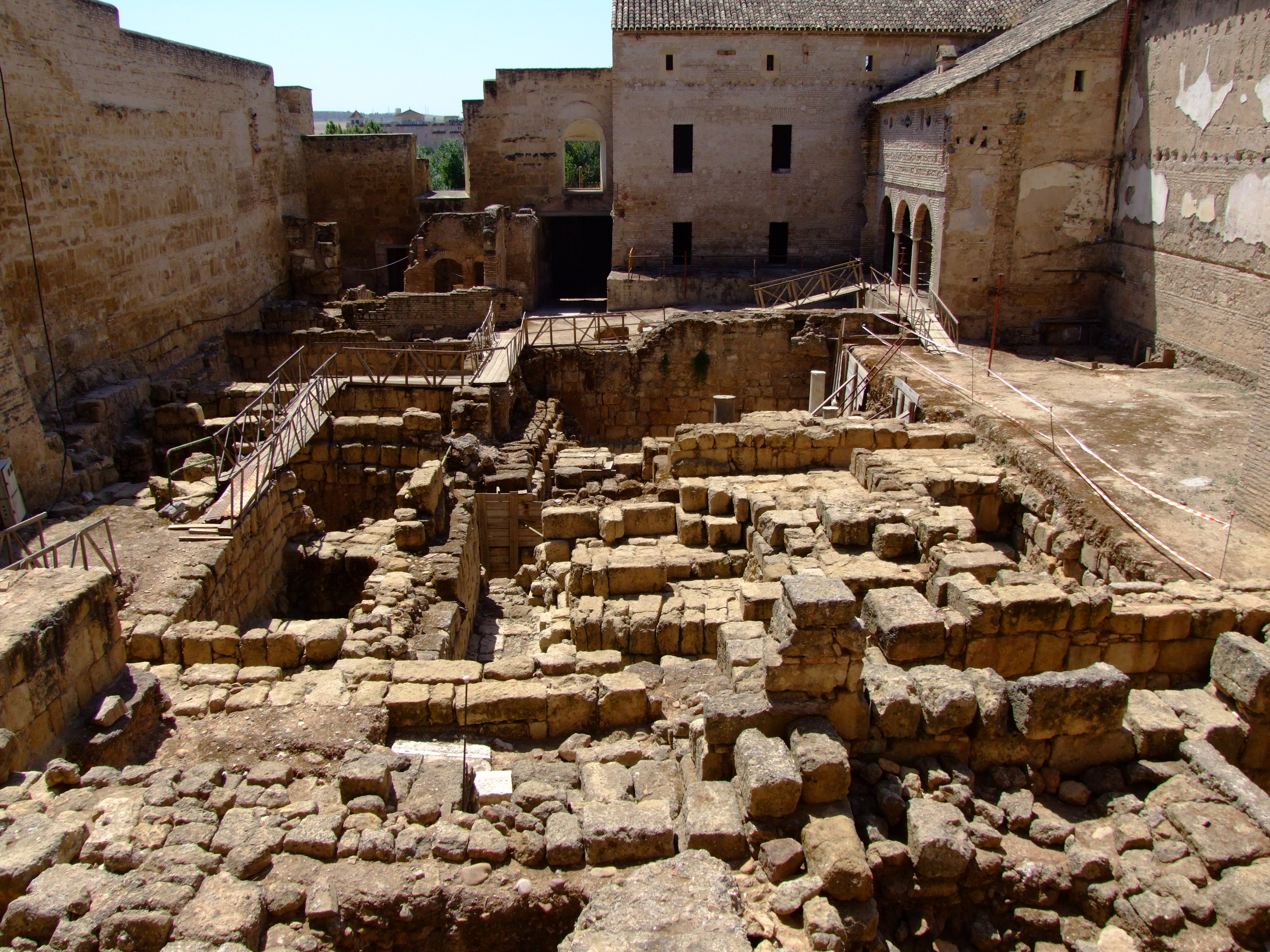
Courtyard of the Women

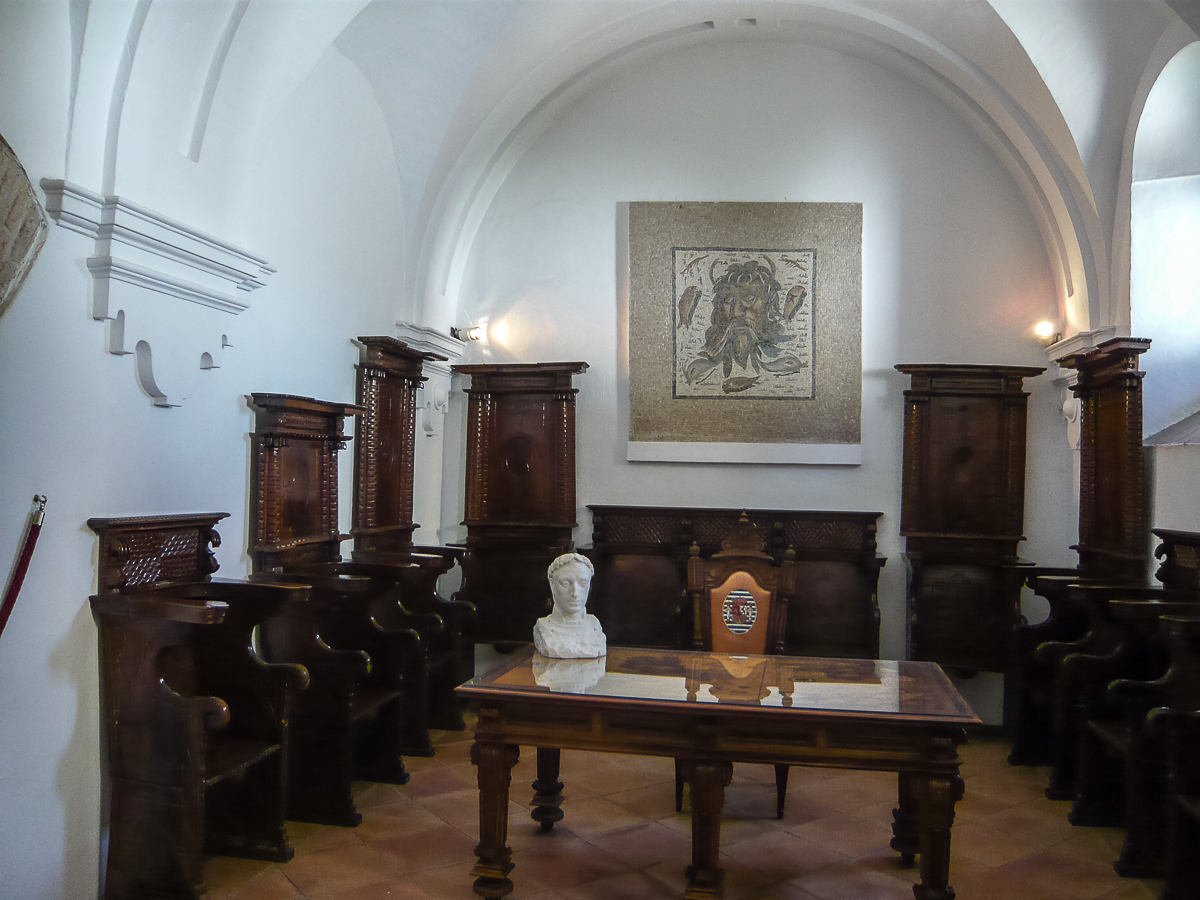
Reception Hall

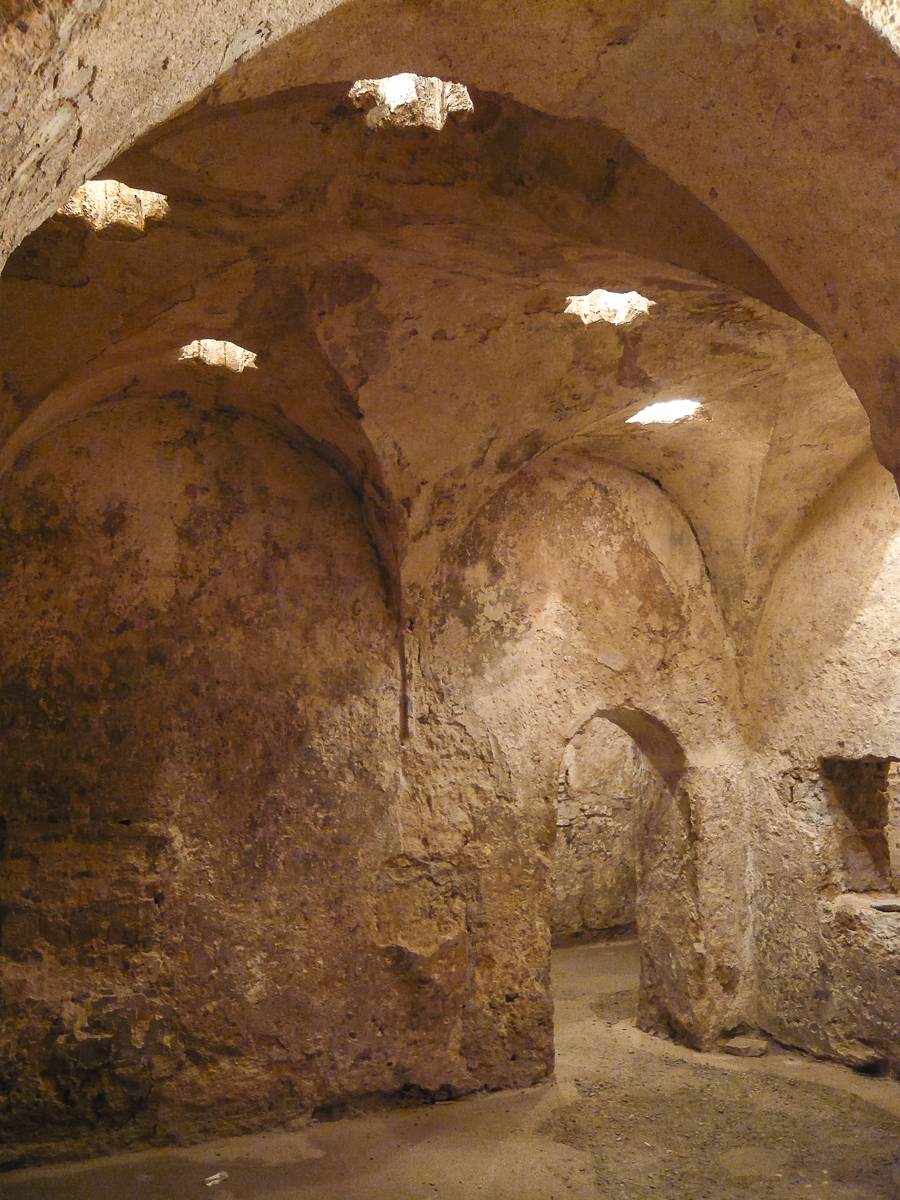
Royal Baths of Doña Leonor

=== Hall of Mosaics (Salón de los Mosaicos) ===
The main hall of the building, constructed in the 18th century, is referred to as the “Hall of Mosaics”, given the impressive Mosaics that can be found within the hall. The mosaics on show were discovered at the Corredera Square (Plaza de la Corredera) towards the end of the 1950s and formed part of the Roman Circus, as well as a sarcophagus from the 3rd Century. The hall is currently a highly sought after civil marriage location by many Cordoban citizens.

Beneath the current floor of the hall, it is still possible to discover the remains of which are believed to be from the Royal Baths which were used by high dignitaries during the Muslim era.

=== Courtyard of the Moriscos (Patio Morisco) ===
The courtyard of the Moriscos, also known as the Mudejar Courtyard, is situated to the western side of the Alcázar. Taking on a square floor plan, it is surrounded by arched verandas with the exception of its western face. The western face of the patio is where the wall that connects the Tower of the Lions and the Tower of the Inquisition is found, and also through which the Gardens of the Alcázar (Jardines del Alcázar) can be accessed. The patio is centred by a water fountain which sits in-between two ponds.

=== Courtyard of the Women (Patio de las mujeres) ===
The courtyard of the Women, also known as the eastern courtyard, is situated to the eastern side of the Alcázar. It owes its name to the era during which the Alcázar was used as a prison, with this courtyard being the location where the feminine section of the prison was located. Many archaeological remains from the different constructive phases of the Alcázar are found in this courtyard, as well as remains of former buildings, the Roman castellum and the Andalusian Alcázar.

=== Reception Hall (Sala de recepciones) ===
The reception hall, also known as the Ocean Hall, is a room of square plan which is situated beside the Hall of Mosaics. Incrusted in one of the walls is a Roman mosaic, dedicated to the God Oceanus. Also within the hall are found some seats of honor of the ancient chapter choir which date back to the 17th Century.

=== Royal Baths of Doña Leonor (Baños reales de Doña Leonor) ===
The Royal Baths were constructed in 1328 by King Alfonso the 11th. They were structured into four rooms: the changing room, the cold room, the temperate room and the hot room. They owe their name to Leonor de Guzmán, the King's mistress, in whose honour the Royal Baths were constructed.

== Gardens of the Alcázar (Jardines del Alcázar) ==
A set of gardens and orchards have existed in this area since at least the 10th century when Abd ar-Rahman III constructed an aqueduct to bring water from the nearby Albolafia waterwheel (or noria). The gardens have been neglected or renewed at various times since then. In the late 15th century or at the beginning of the 16th century Queen Isabella I ordered the waterwheel's operation to be halted, and they went into a general decline. The current gardens date from a major remodeling around the mid-20th century, while at the same time the area of gardens was reduced in size due to the construction of the Avenue del Alcázar road on its southeast side.

Today the gardens consist of an impressive area of approximately 55,000 m^{2} of magnificent gardens with forest species including palm, cypress, orange and lemon trees, which surround a number of elegant fountains and ponds. The gardens are structured on three levels: the Higher Garden, the Middle Garden and the Lower Garden. The Higher Garden occupies a space between the Tower of the Lions and the Royal Stables (Caballerizas Reales). The Middle Garden is located on its southeast side and stretches along the castle wall that separates the gardens from the Courtyard of the Moriscos. It is reached from a grand staircase and includes two large pools. The Lower Garden occupies a much larger area to the southeast, including three elongated pools lined with flowers and trees and other manicured gardens beyond. The Lower Garden also includes the King's Avenue or Promenade of Kings (Paseo de los Reyes), an avenue bordered by lines of cylindrical cypress trees and divided into two paths by two narrow ponds. On this walk, there are several sculptures of the kings who built the Alcázar, which are located on pedestals aligned between the hedges. One sculpture represents Christopher Columbus with Queen Isabella and King Ferdinand, commemorating Columbus's first meeting with the Catholic Monarchs which took place in the Alcázar.

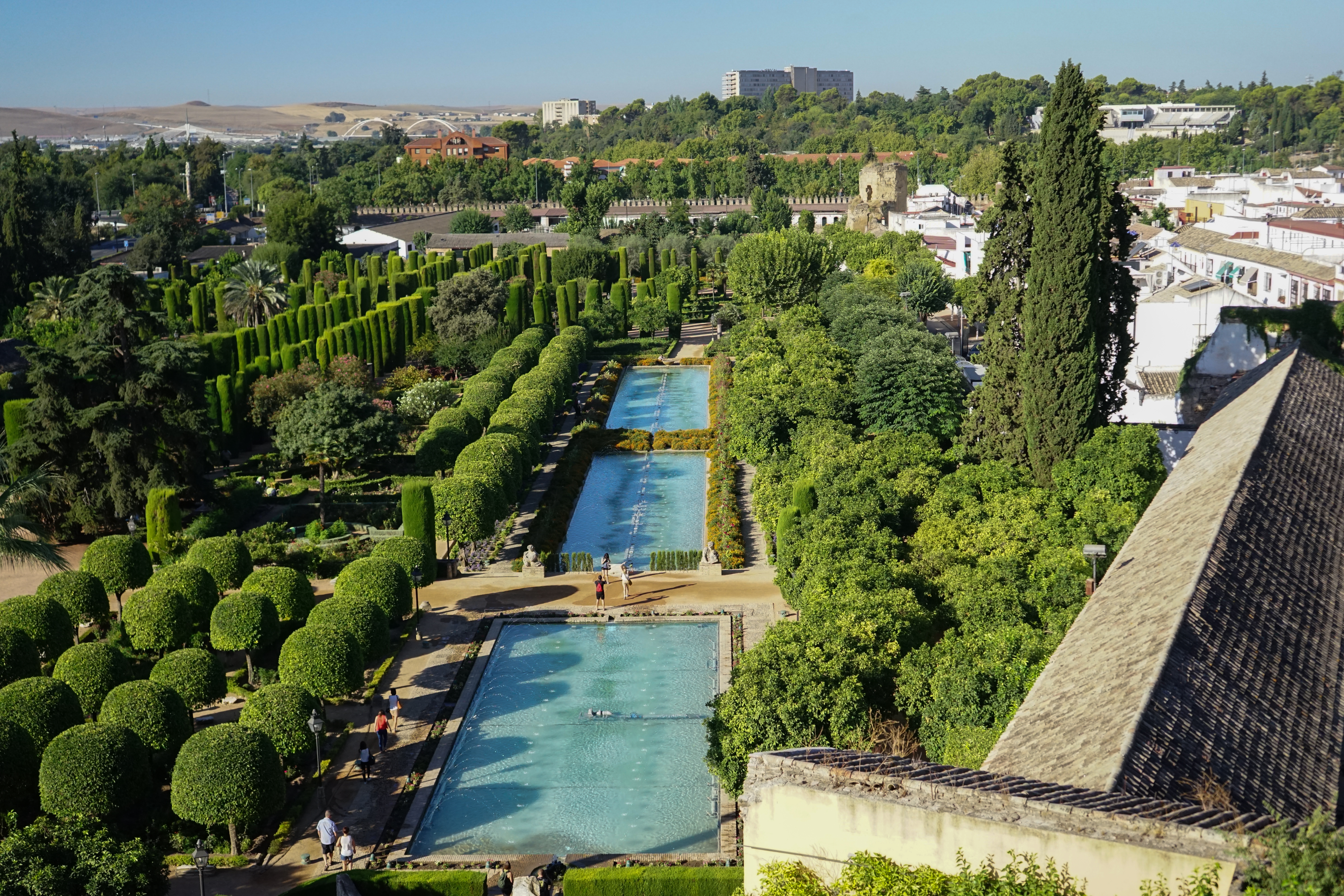
General view of the gardens from the Tower of the Lions

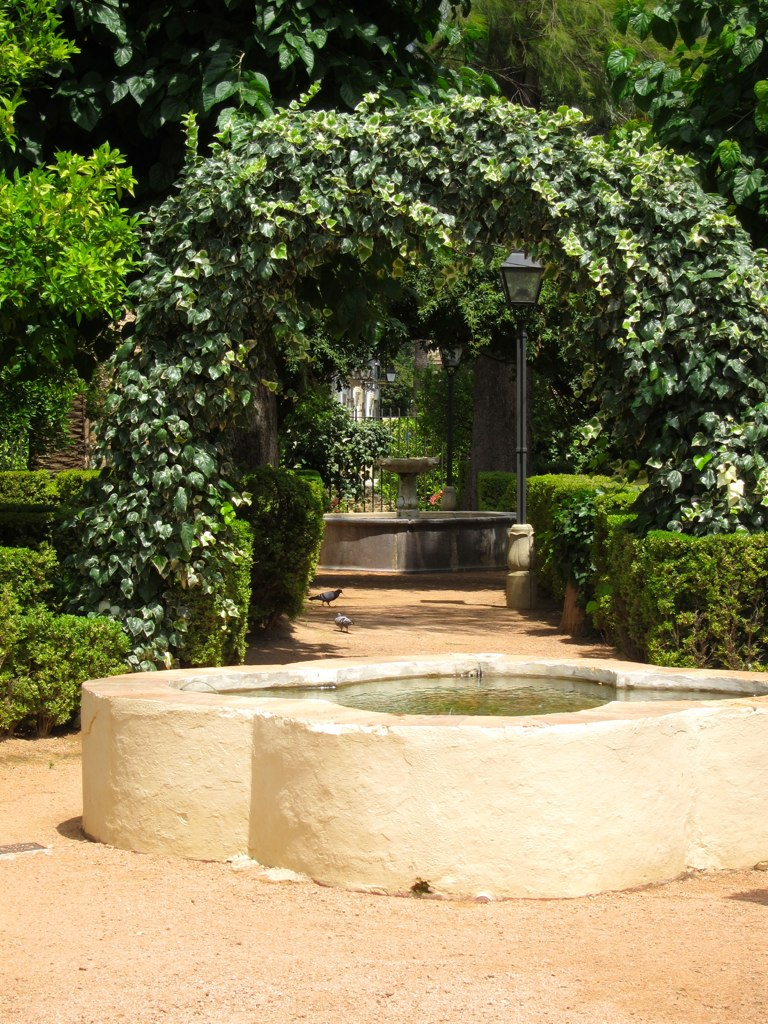
The Higher Garden

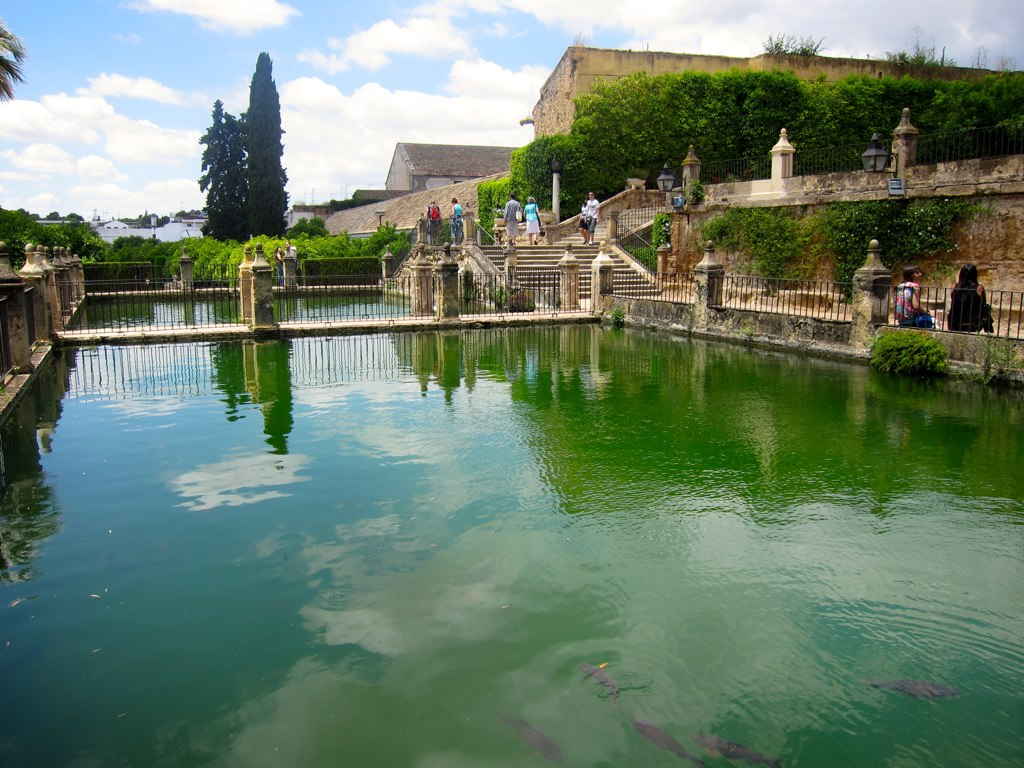
The pools of the Middle Garden

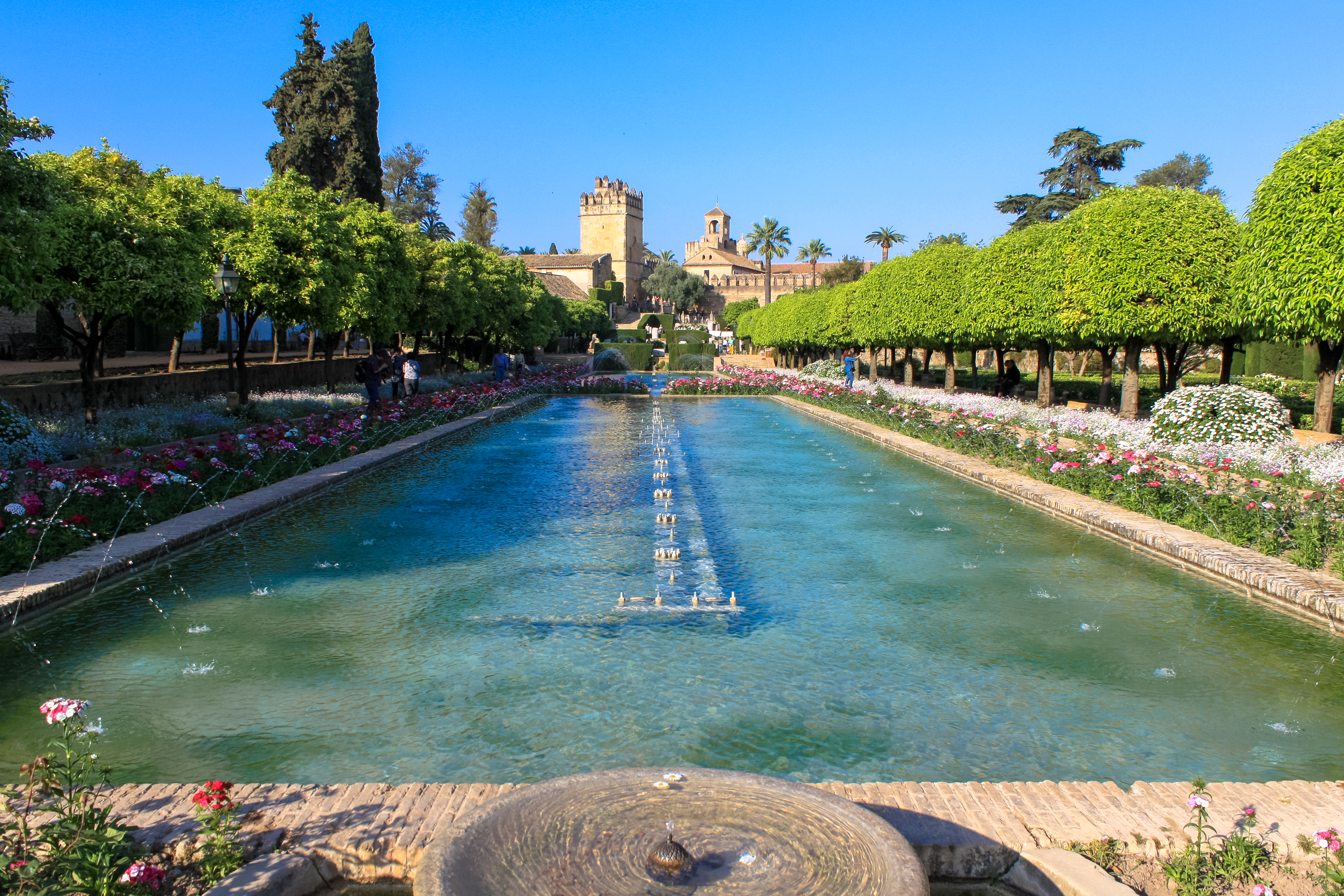
The pools of the Lower Garden, looking back towards the castle

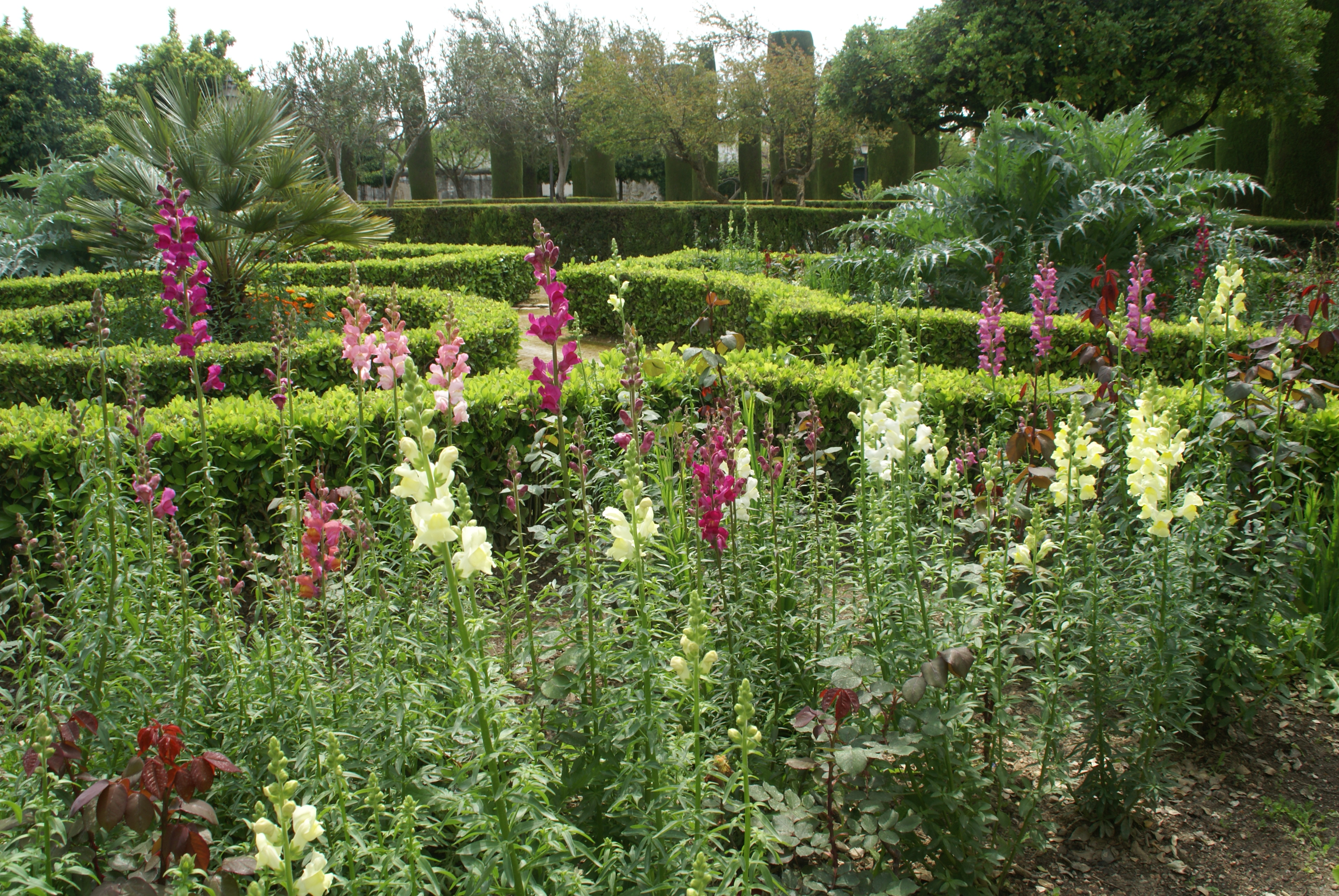
Other manicured gardens in the Lower Garden

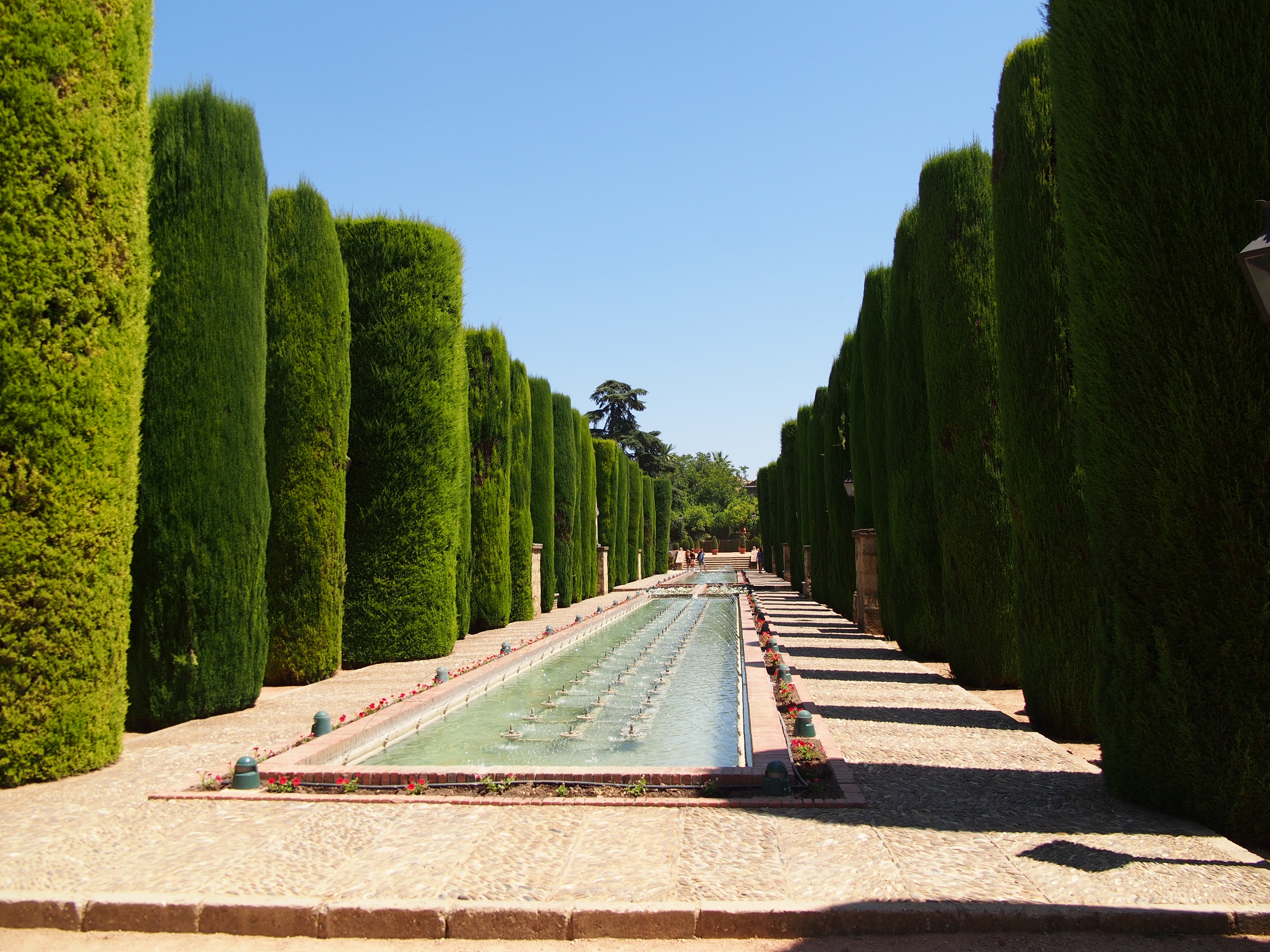
The Promenade of Kings

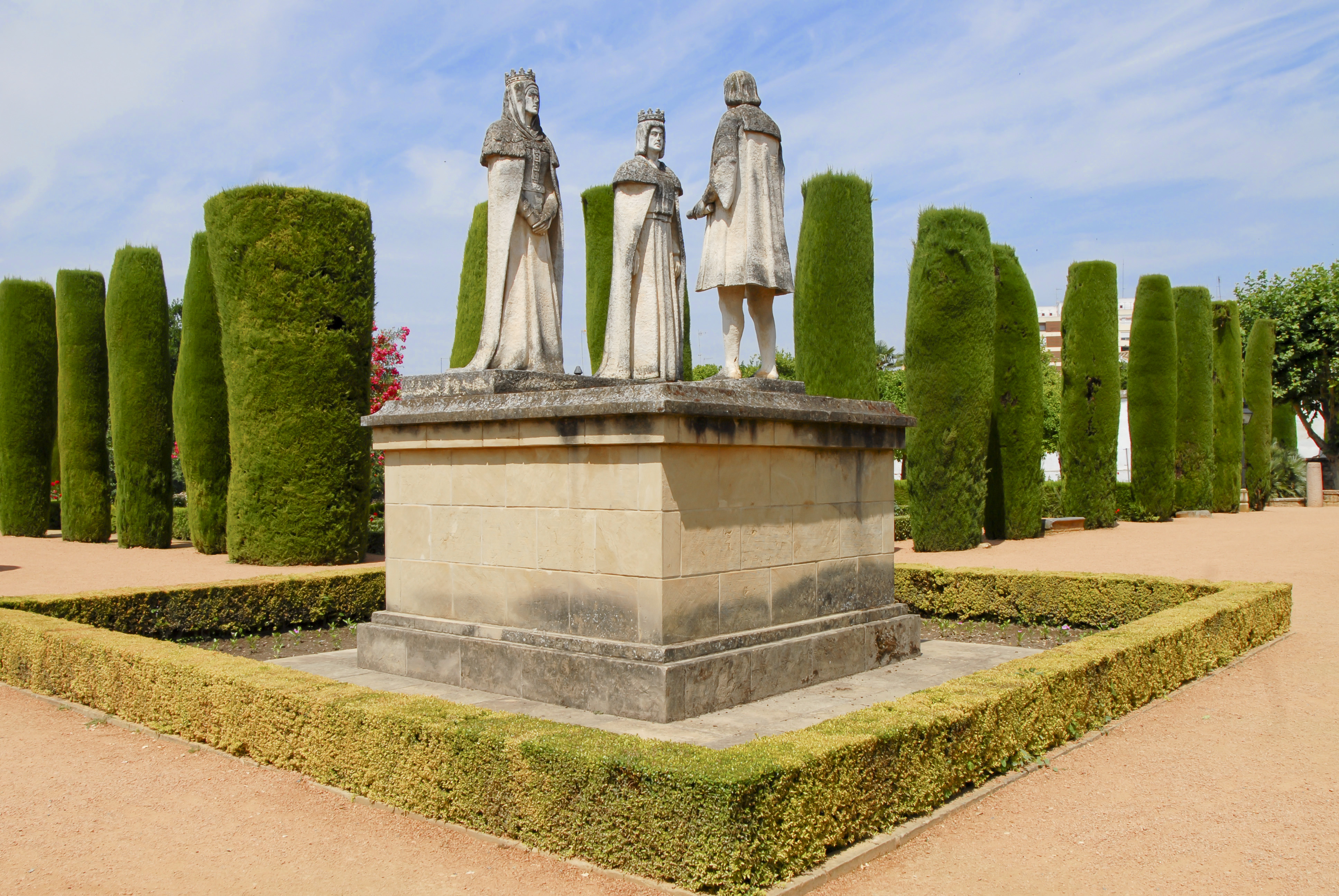
Statues of the Catholic Monarchs and Christopher Columbus at the Promenade of Kings
