= Episcopal Palace, Cordoba =

Palace in Córdoba, Spain

Coordinates: 37.878231°N 4.780297°W

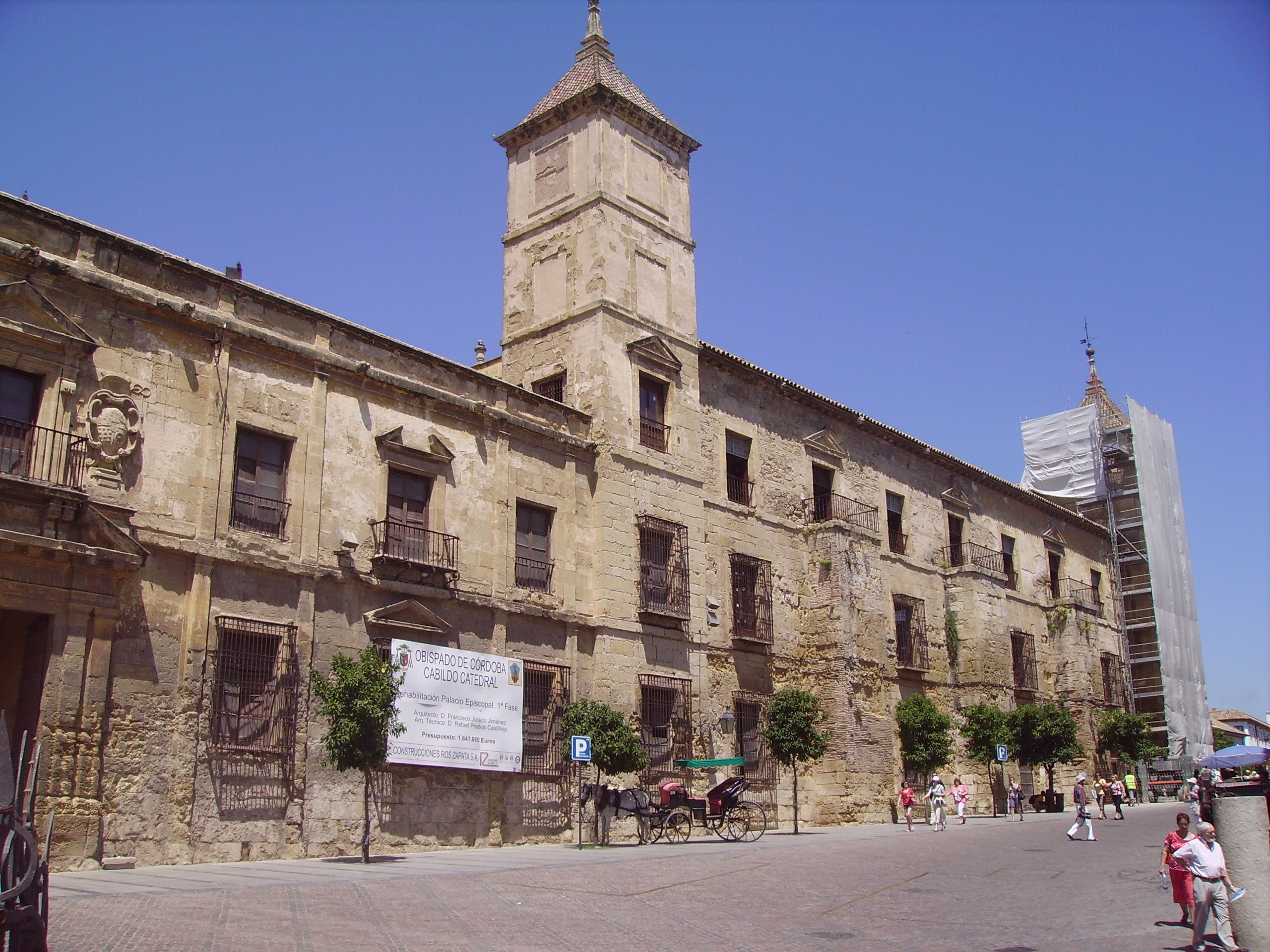
Episcopal Palace of Cordoba

The Episcopal Palace in Córdoba, Spain, is situated in the historic centre of the city, just opposite the west front of the Mosque–Cathedral of Córdoba.
