= Gate of Almodóvar =

Coordinates: 37°52′50″N 4°47′03″W

Almodóvar Gate
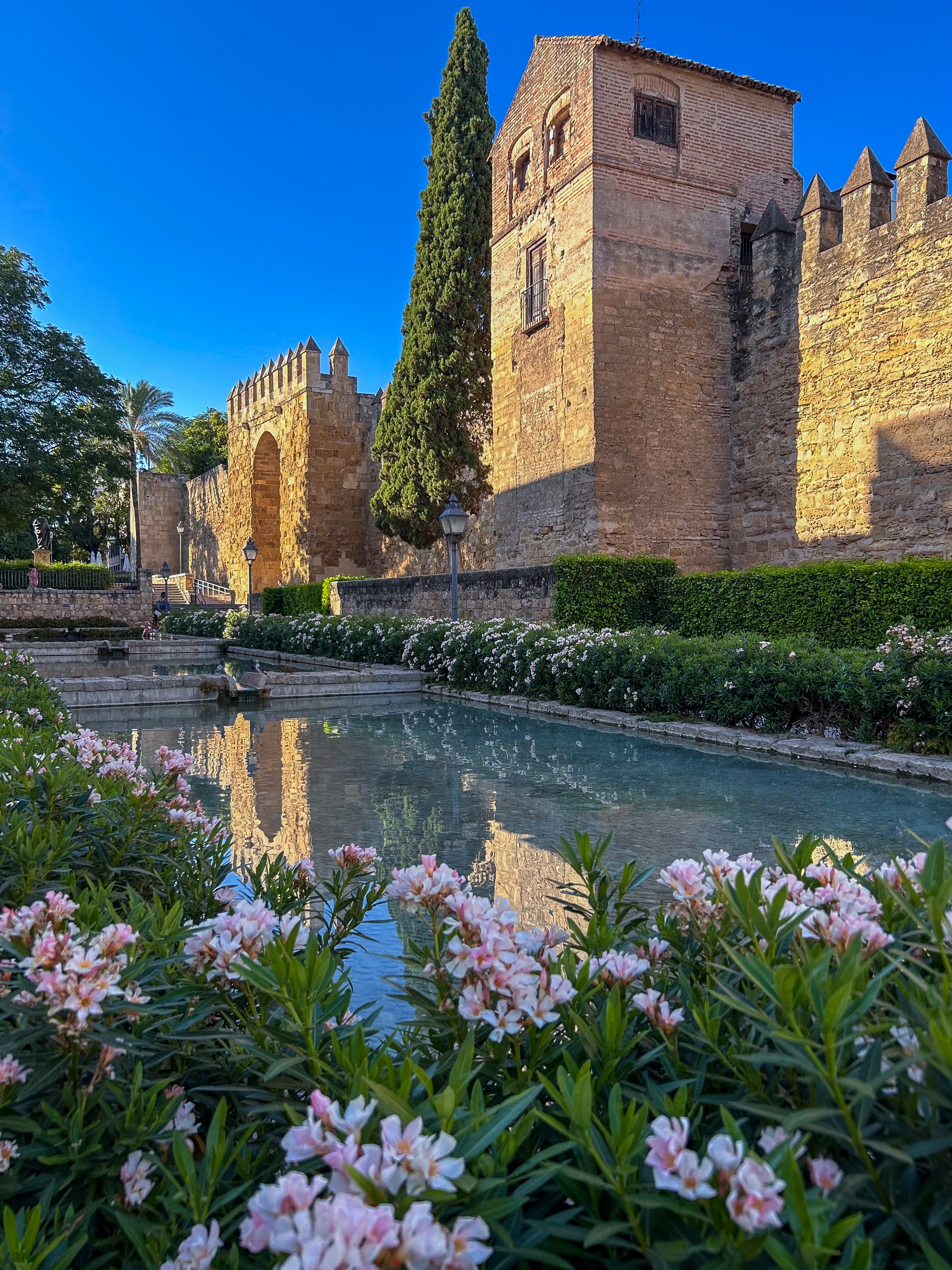
- Almodóvar Gate and Roman city walls of Córdoba.

General information
- Type: City gate
- Architectural style: Moorish
- Location: Cordoba, Spain

The Puerta de Almodóvar (English: "Gate of Almodóvar") is a gate of Arabian origin that provided access to the interior of the Roman walls of the city of Córdoba in Spain. Its name originates from the old road that connected this gate with the town of Almodóvar del Río, which is approximately 23 kilometers from Córdoba. It was also known by other names during the Arabian era, such as the Gate of Nogal (Bab al-Chawz) or the Gate of Badajoz.

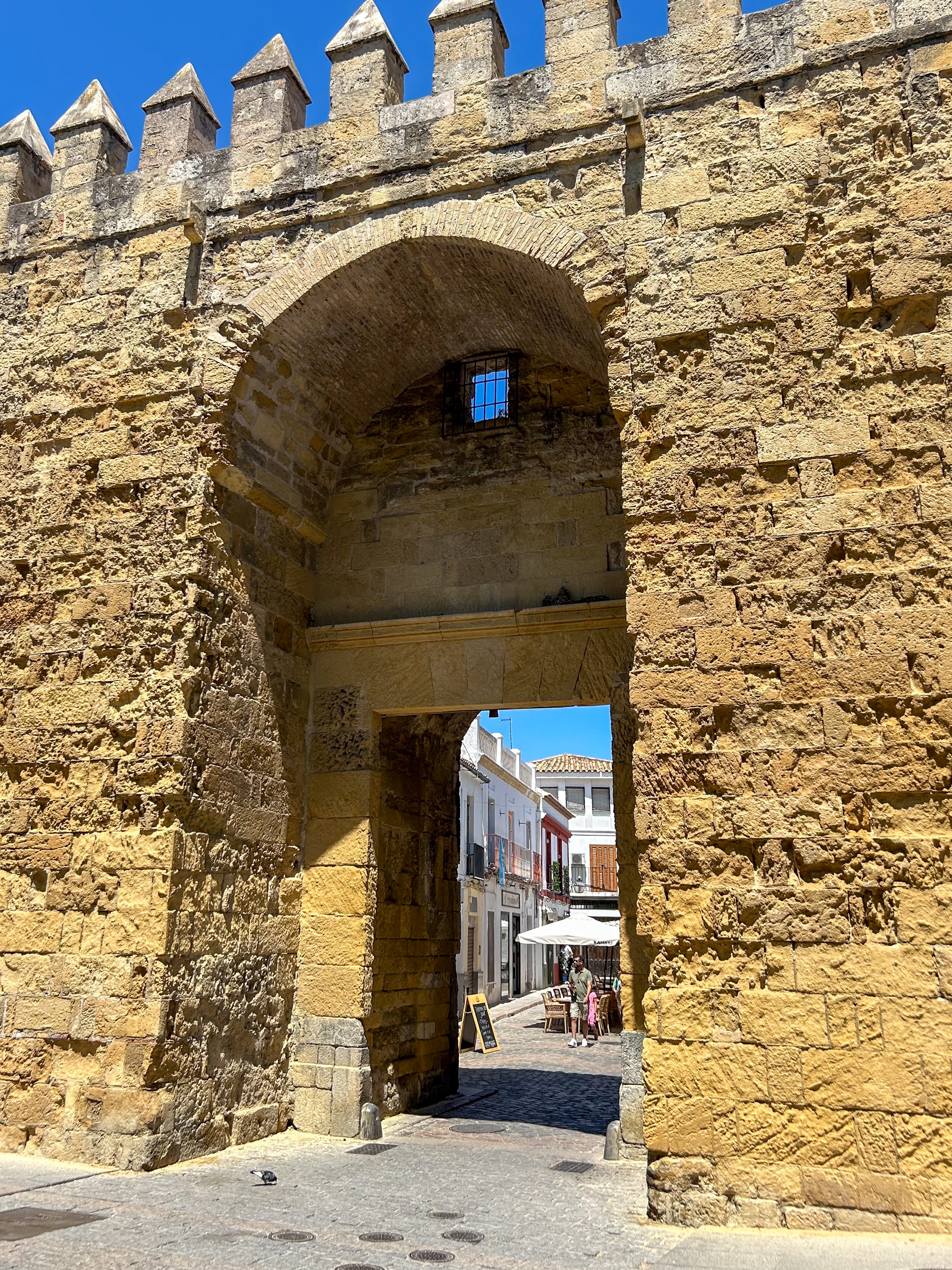
The Almodóvar Gate, part of the Roman walls of Córdoba, opens into the Jewish Quarter of Córdoba.

It is one of the three remaining gates of Córdoba's medieval wall, preserved alongside the Puerta del Puente and the Seville Gate. However, it is the oldest and least modified of the group. It is part of the historic center of Córdoba, which was declared a UNESCO World Heritage Site in 1984.

== Architecture ==
The current gate, built in the 14th century over the Arab gate, consists of two rectangular towers connected by an arch, which features a high barrel vault. This arch, framed by a slightly protruding rectangular border, was sealed off at the beginning of the 19th century by a wall in which a lintelled door was opened. The structure of the monument is made of cut sandstone blocks with brick additions. At the base of the parapet, a protruding molding can be seen, and at the top, complete crenellations and a walkway remain.

== Cairuán Street Promenade ==
Outside the wall, a stream runs between paved walkways that connect this access point with the Arco de la Luna. This area is located just outside the Judería of Córdoba and once held an ancient Jewish cemetery.

The area was previously called the Huerta del Rey (Spanish: "King's Garden"), due to its proximity to the Alcázar of Córdoba.

The area was renamed Cairuán Street on May 27, 1968. This renaming was in recognition of Córdoba's twinning with the Tunisian city of Kairouan, a gesture honoring the historical connection between the Fatimid Caliphate and the Caliphate of Córdoba. Furthermore, the Great Mosque of Kairouan shares architectural features very similar to those of the Mosque-Cathedral of Córdoba.

During this period, the promenade was restored by mayor Antonio Guzmán Reina and statues of two great Cordobans were installed.

The first monument, located near the Almodóvar Gate, is dedicated to the Roman philosopher Seneca, cast in bronze by Amadeo Ruiz Olmos and inaugurated in 1965 by members of the International Congress of Philosophy, coinciding with the 19th centenary of the philosopher's death. This statue was funded by the bullfighter Manuel Benítez "El Cordobés" as compensation for the urban development problems caused by the construction of the Los Gallos Hotel.

Two years later, in the southeastern section of the promenade, a monument to the Muslim polymath and jurist Averroes was inaugurated.
