= San Juan y Todos los Santos =

Church building in Córdoba, Spain

Coordinates: 37°52′57″N 04°46′59″W

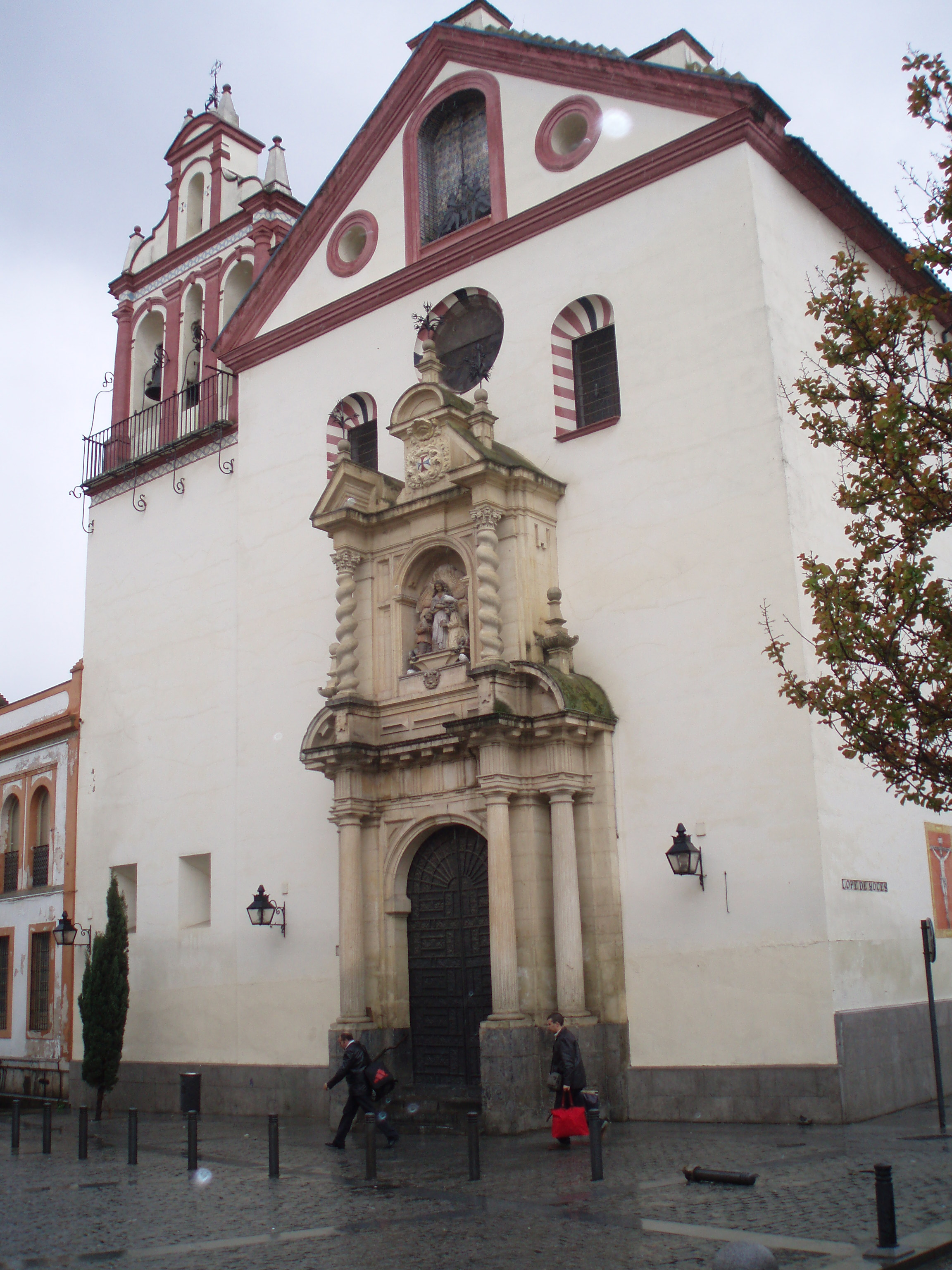
San Juan y Todos los Santos, Córdoba

San Juan y Todos los Santos (St John and All Saints), also known as Iglesia de la Trinidad (Trinity Church), is a Catholic church located on the Plaza de la Trinidad in Córdoba, Spain. It stands on the site of the former Convento de la Trinidad established shortly after Fernando III conquered the city in 1236. Built in the Baroque style, it forms part of the Historic centre of Córdoba, a UNESCO World Heritage site.

== History ==
It is believed the original church and convent were built on the site of a mosque although nothing remains of it. Nor are there any remains of the Church of San Juan de los Caballeros which remained after the convent was disbanded. There are however records of the roof collapsing in the 16th century and of its subsequent repair funded by Don Martin de Córdoba.

After the building again fell into disrepair, it was decided to build a completely new church which was consecrated on Trinity Sunday in 1705. The Baroque building is constructed in the form of a Latin cross with a nave covered by a barrel-vaulted ceiling decorated with painted lunettes. The dome above the transept is supported by pendentives. The church's artwork includes a figure of Christ the Saviour (Santo Cristo de la Salud) from 1590 carved by an anonymous author. It was brought from the former convent church of the Order of the Trinity (Orden Trinitaria) which used to be located in the Vía Crucis. Recent paintings from the nearby Cofrafía de la Santa Faz monastery include Nuestro Padre Jesús Nazerano by Antonio Dubé de Luque and María Santísima de la Trinidad by Antonio Salto.

The decorations surrounding the church's entrance contrast with its whitewashed facade topped with a triangular pediment and two oculi. The portal consists of a Romanesque arch flanked by double Doric columns with a frieze of triglyphs and metopes. The upper section with Solomonic columns contains group of sculptures in a niche with an angel in a Trinity robe assisting two captives. The square-shaped sacristy is decorated with several notable murals by Antonio Palomino (1653–1726). They depict scenes from the Old Testament associated with the Eucharist. The church's altarpieces are also decorated with a number of works from the 17th and 18th centuries.

== Gallery ==
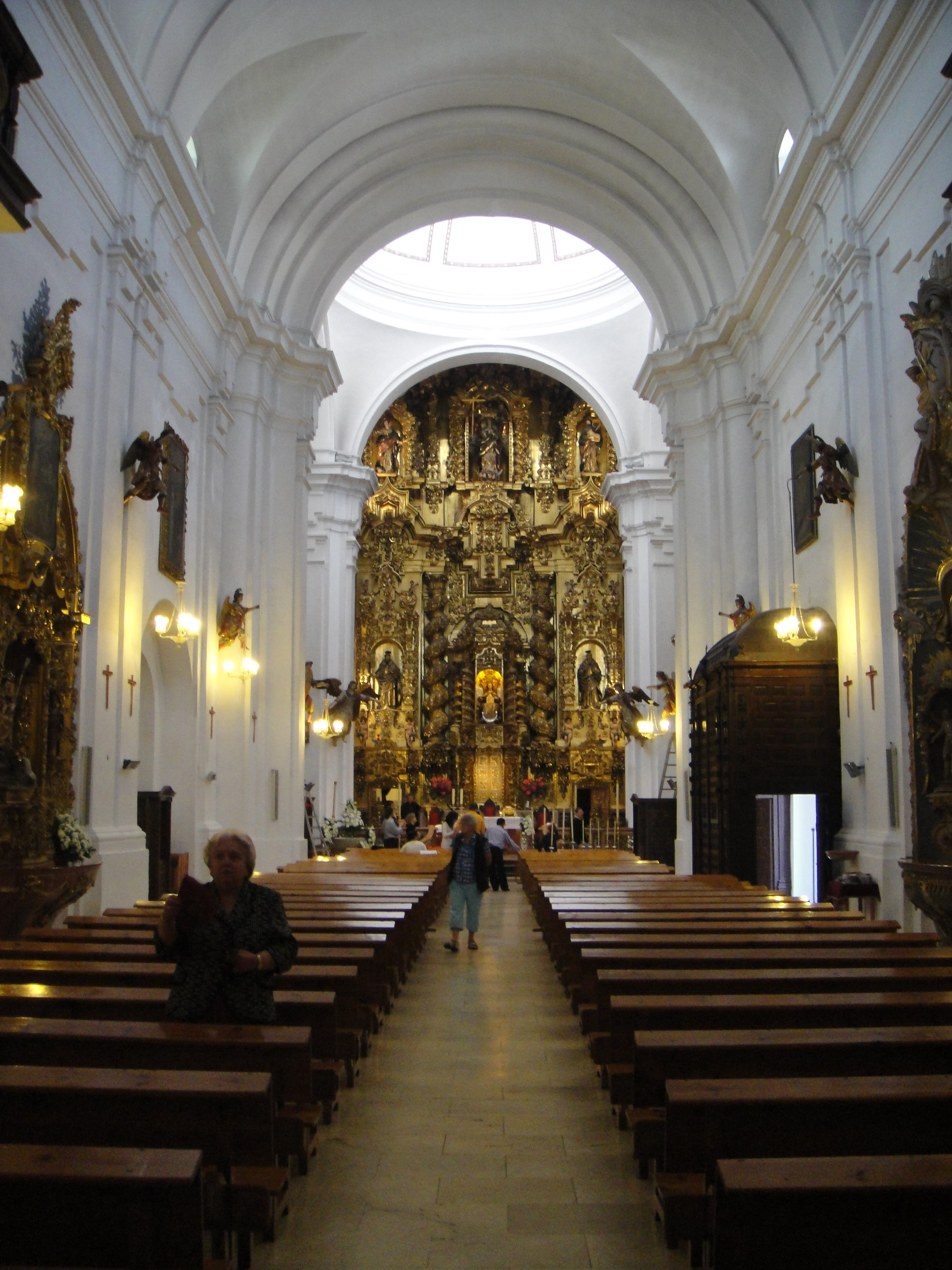
Nave

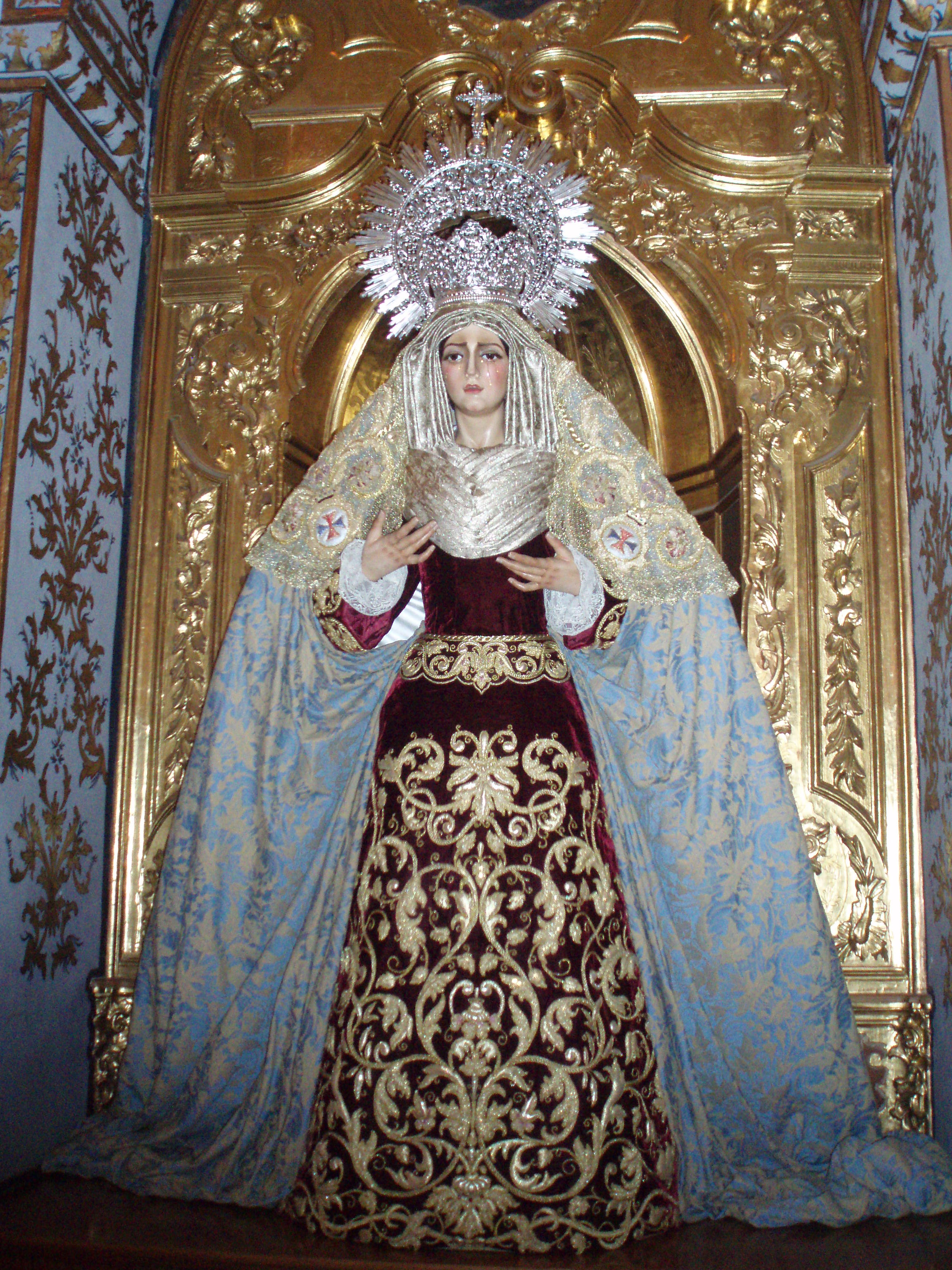
María Santísima de la Trinidad (17th century)

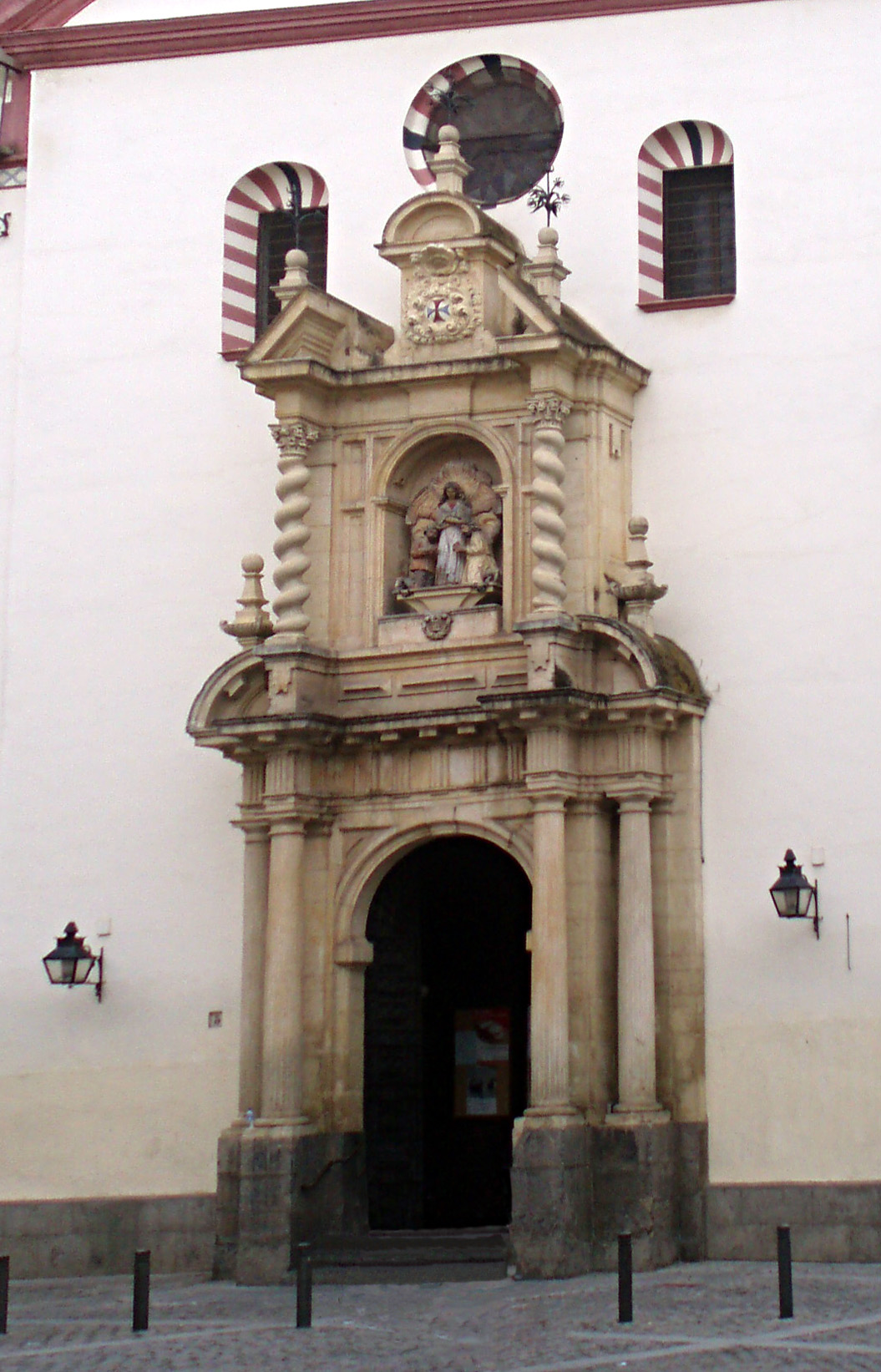
Decorated portal

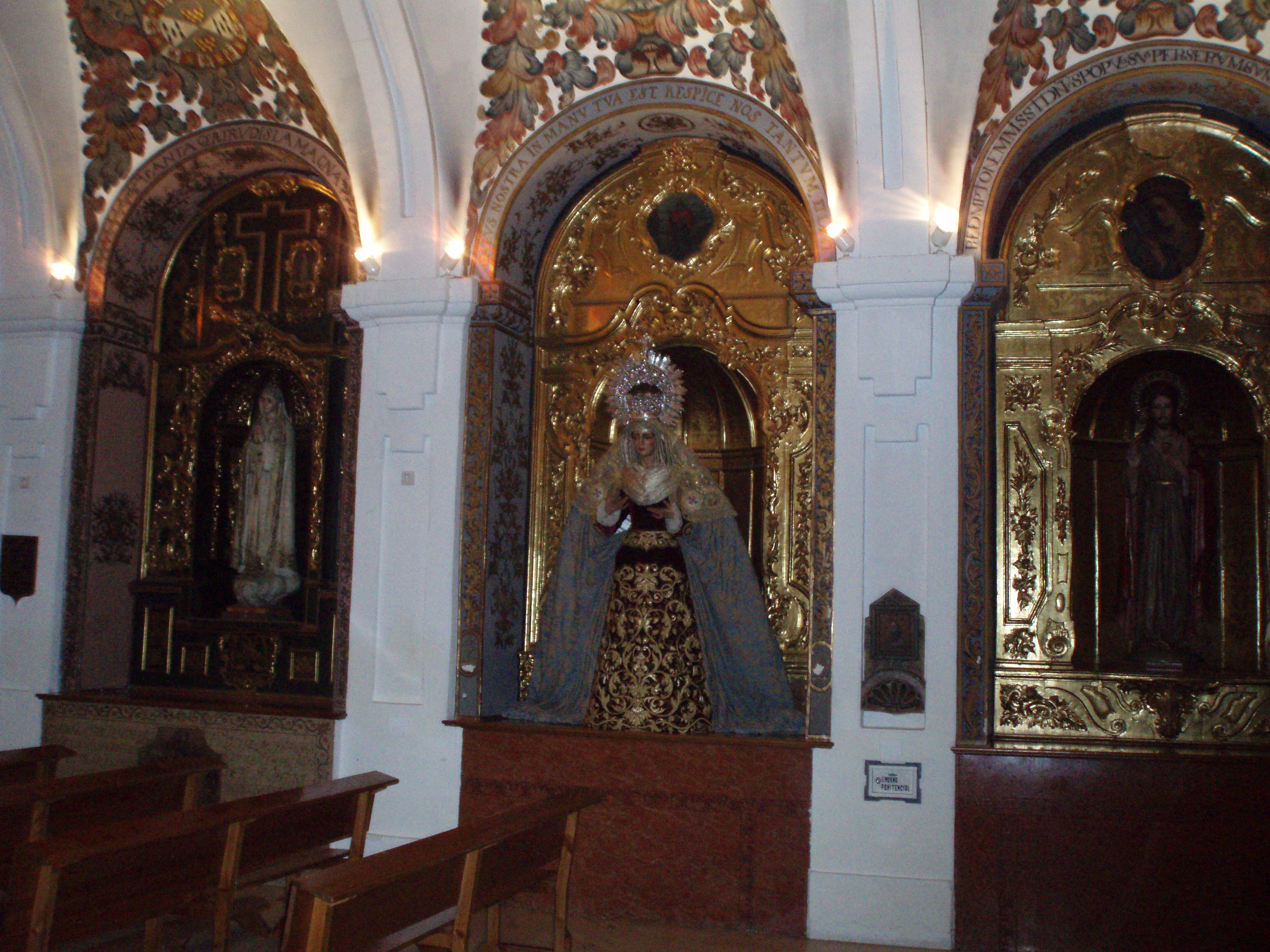
Decorations in the lower chancel (late 20th century)

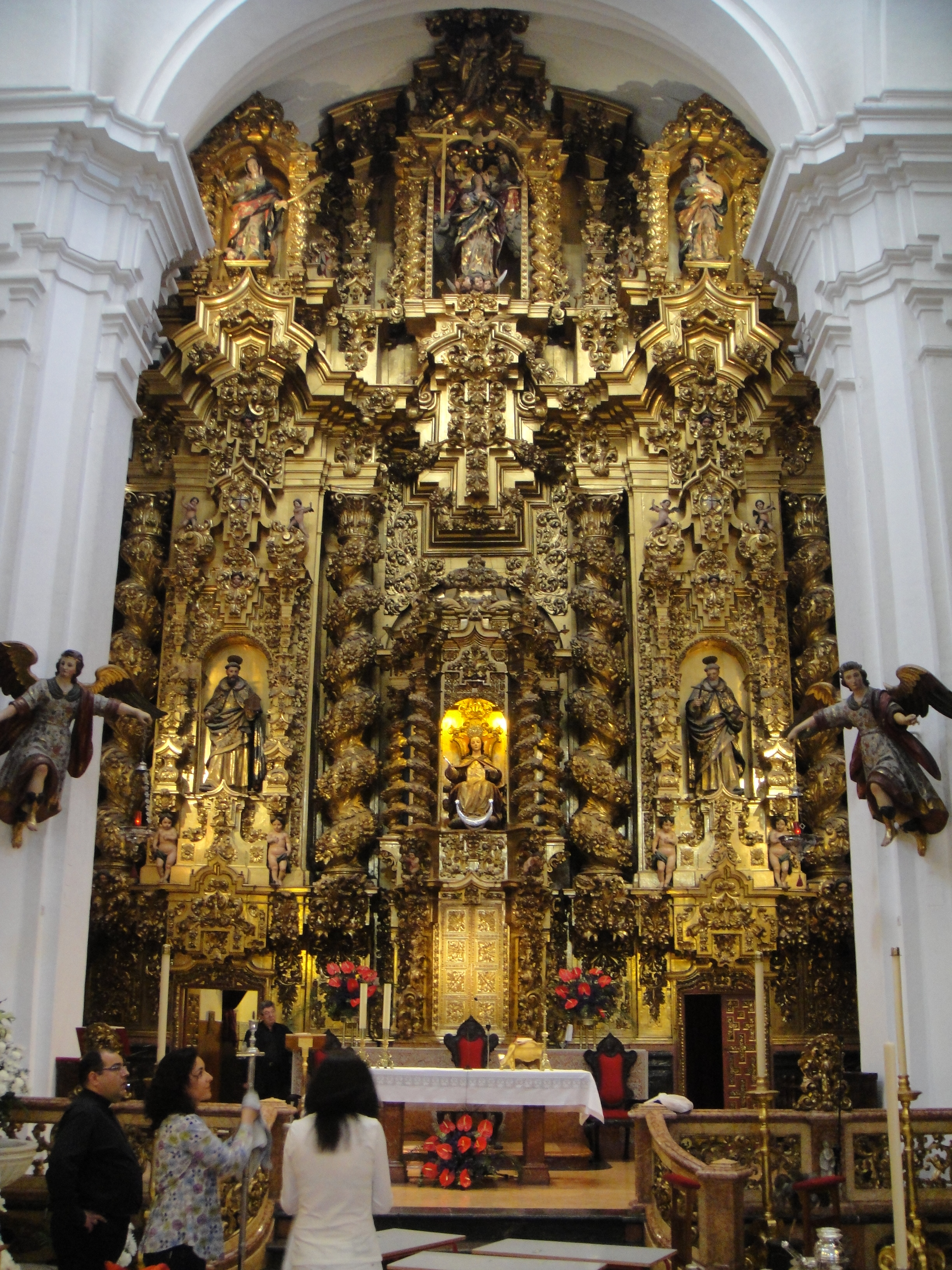
Main altarpiece
