= Convento de Santa Clara (Córdoba) =

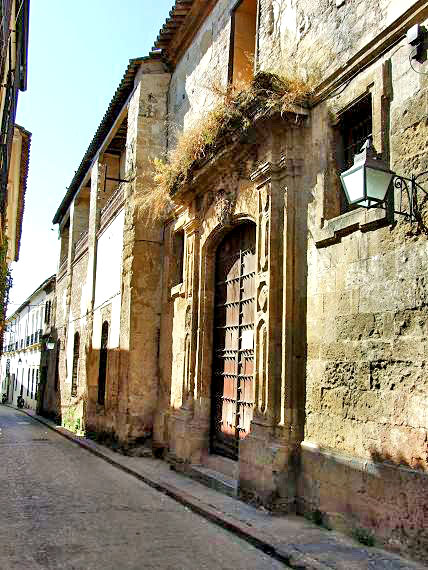
Convento de Santa Clara, 2008

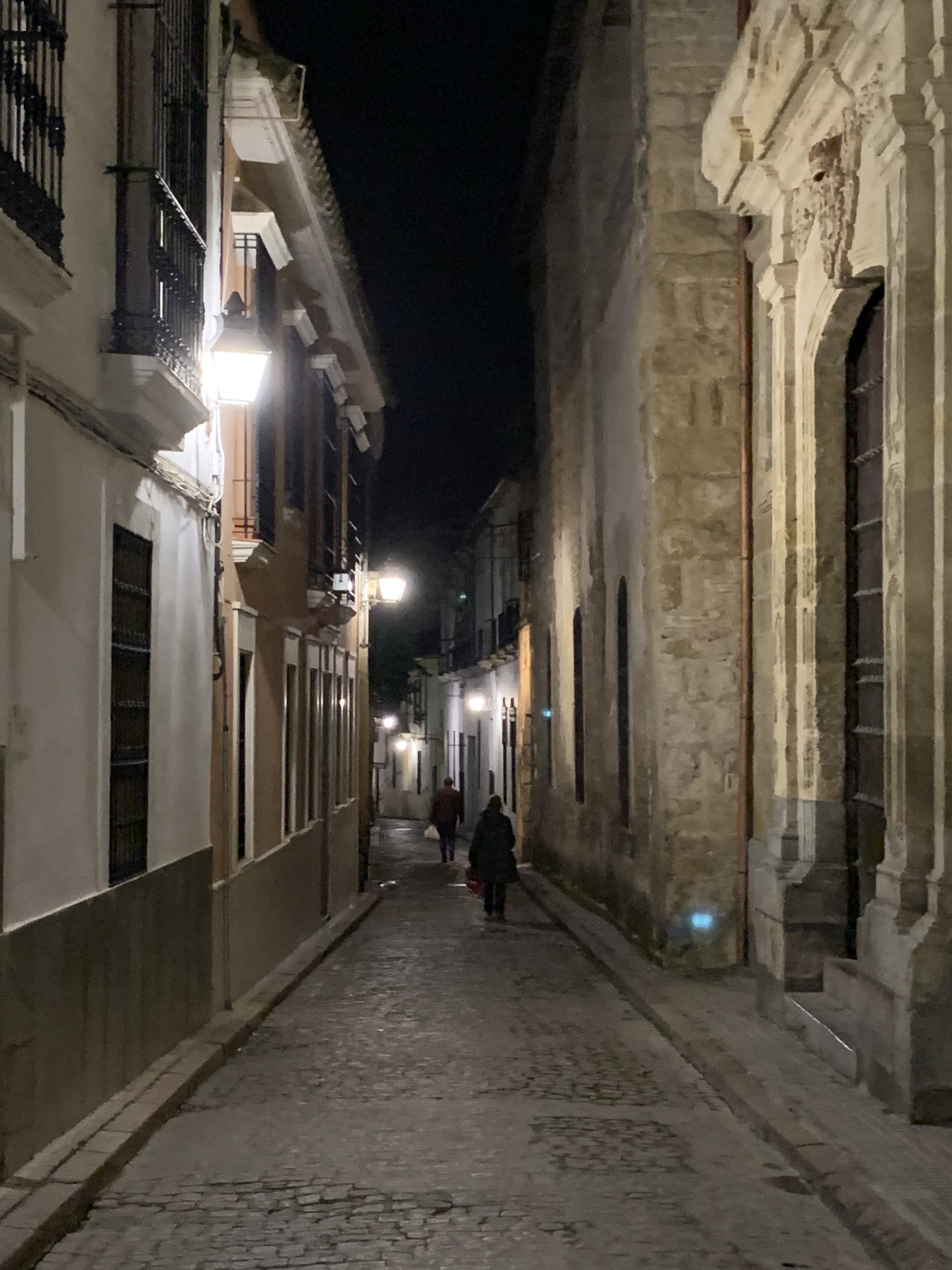
2020

Convento de Santa Clara is a defunct convent located in Córdoba, Andalusia, Spain, in the historic centre.

== Location and previous history ==
This building stands near the middle of Calle del Rey Heredia, at the corner of Calle Osio.

It was founded on - and reusing parts of - a mosque, which had been rising in times of Almanzor, and dated from 976. It is commonly admitted that that mosque had been built on the basilica of Santa Catalina dated from the 6th century.

In the 1990s, archaeological excavations were carried out in the convent. No evidence of settlement was found on the site prior to the construction of the 10th century mosque. It was found that in the period after the Christian reconquest, the land situated between the monastery and the Great Mosque/cathedral (less than 200 m south-west of Santa Clara convent) was used as a market-garden; this suggests that this whole area, which stood within the confines of the walled enceinte, had a history of usage as a market-garden.

== History ==
This is the first women's monastery established in Cordoba after the Reconquista. It was instituted in 1256, just twenty years after the successful siege of Cordoba by the troops of Ferdinand III of Castile in 1236. In 1256 the convent was inhabited by only eight Poor Clares.

At some point it was also known as the Convent of Santa Isabel, in honour of Isabel of France for her strong links with the Spanish crown. But to this day the building is still known as Santa Clara convent.

In the 16th century it underwent a profound transformation. In the 18th century a baroque portal was added.

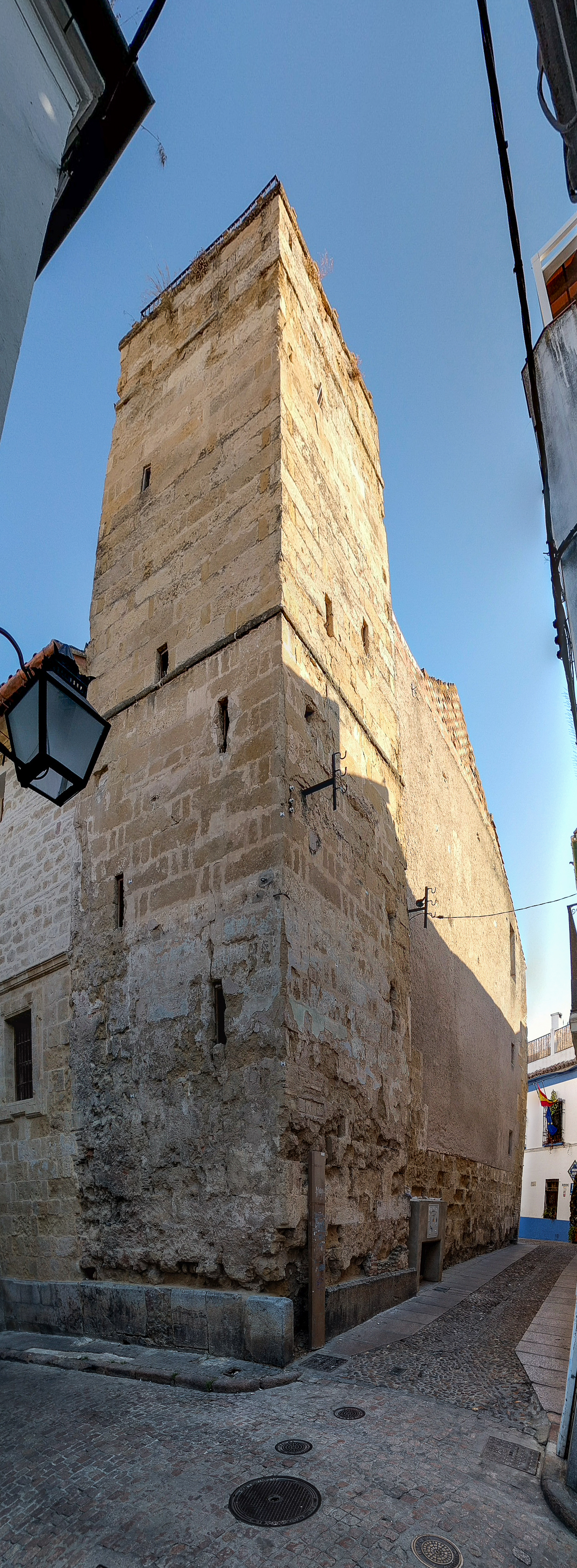
Minaret, later bell tower; Calle Osia, 2016

The convent was abandoned in 1868 with the application of the decrees of exclaustration of 1868: the nuns moved to the Convent of the Holy Cross - itself also a Poor Clares convent.

Later, the building of Santa Clara convent in Calle del Rey Heredia was used as a powder magazine, a military barracks and even a laundry. It was eventually acquired by the City Council in the 1950s, with the intention of transforming it into a school.

== Description ==
Situated within the defunct convent - in the primitive prayer room - is the Church of St Catherine (Catalina) which was built on a design of a slightly irregular Greek Cross and measured 19.5 by 21 metres (64 ft × 69 ft). The east-facing sanctuary contains remains of a mosaic with motifs specific to the primitive Christian iconography. It dates from the time of the Byzantine control over the city, between 554 and 572.

Parts of the mosque's structure have been preserved, including a mihrab, a courtyard ablutions and the minaret. The minaret was re-used as a bell-tower; it was declared a Bien de Interés Cultural in 1931.

Some battlements and a staircase have also been retained from the mosque. On the outside, in Calle Osio, there is still a very deteriorated Caliphal horseshoe dated 10th century, that was the entrance to the courtyard.
