= Judería de Córdoba =

Jewish quarter of Córdoba, Spain

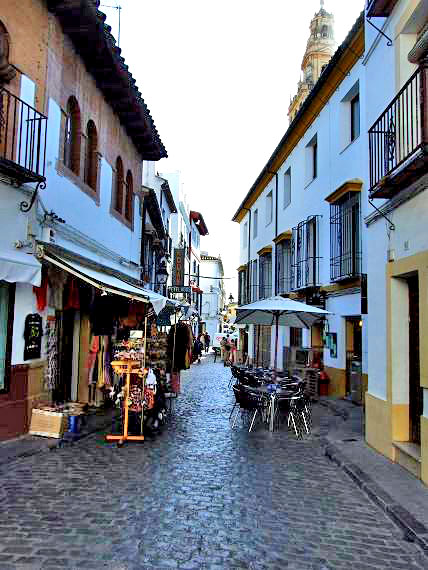
Calle de la Judería de Córdoba

The Judería de Córdoba ('Jewish Quarter of Córdoba') is the area of the Spanish city of Córdoba in which the Jews lived between the 10th and 15th centuries. It is located in the Historic centre of Córdoba, northeast of the Mezquita Catedral (the Mosque-Cathedral), in the area of the following streets: Deanes, Manríquez, Tomás Conde, Judíos, Almanzor and Romero.

It is part of the historic centre of Córdoba which was named a World Heritage Site by UNESCO in 1994.

== Calle de la Judería de Córdoba (Jewish Quarter of Córdoba Street) ==
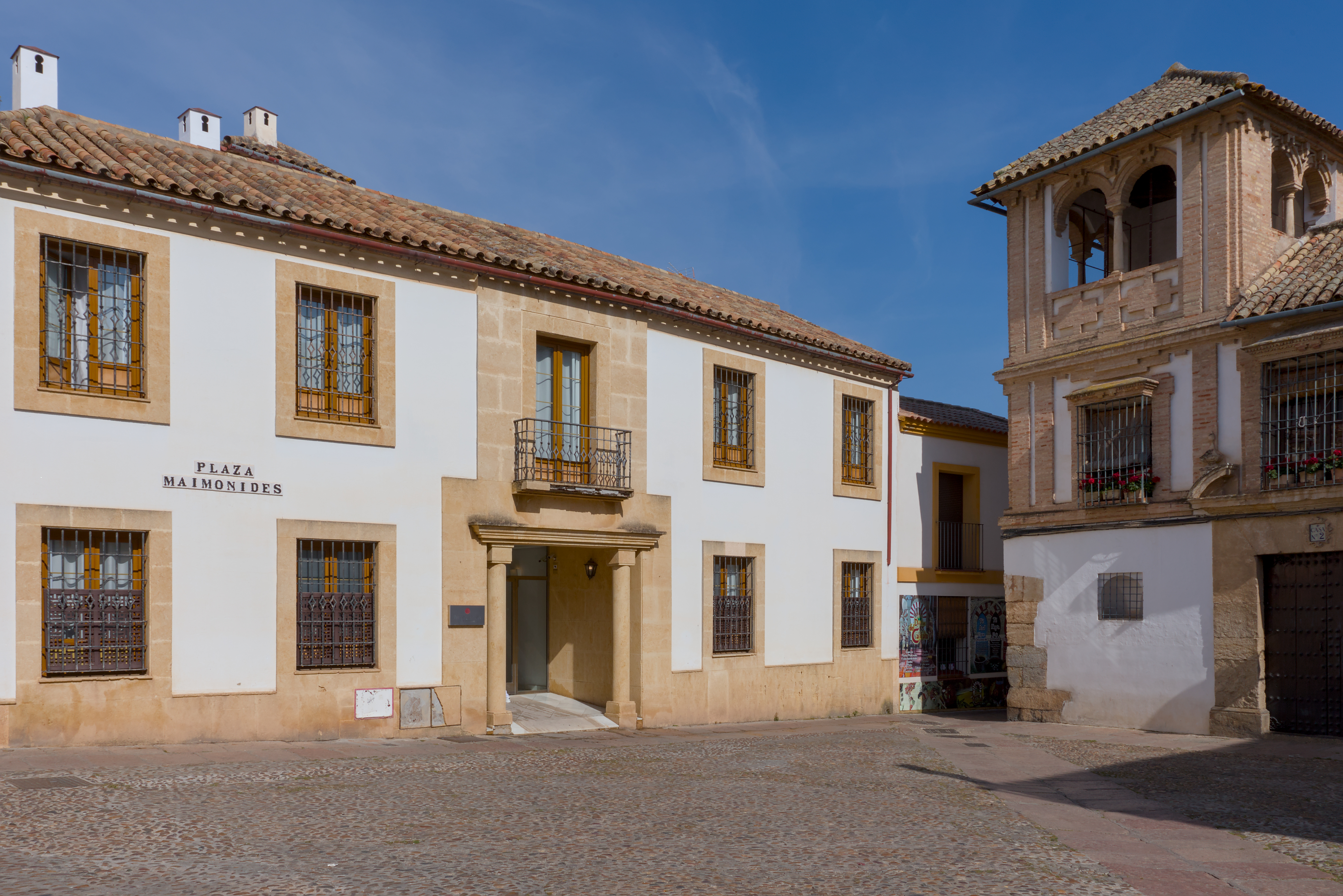
Maimonides square

Córdoba went through a period when Christians, Jews, and Muslims lived together, albeit while the non-Muslim population was subjugated to the jizya tax and Jews had their own court system. On the Calle de los Judíos (Jewish Street) in the Jewish Quarter at the Tiberias Square there is a bronze statue of Maimonides, the prominent Jewish philosopher, Halakhist, rabbi, and physician from Córdoba.

== Places of interest ==
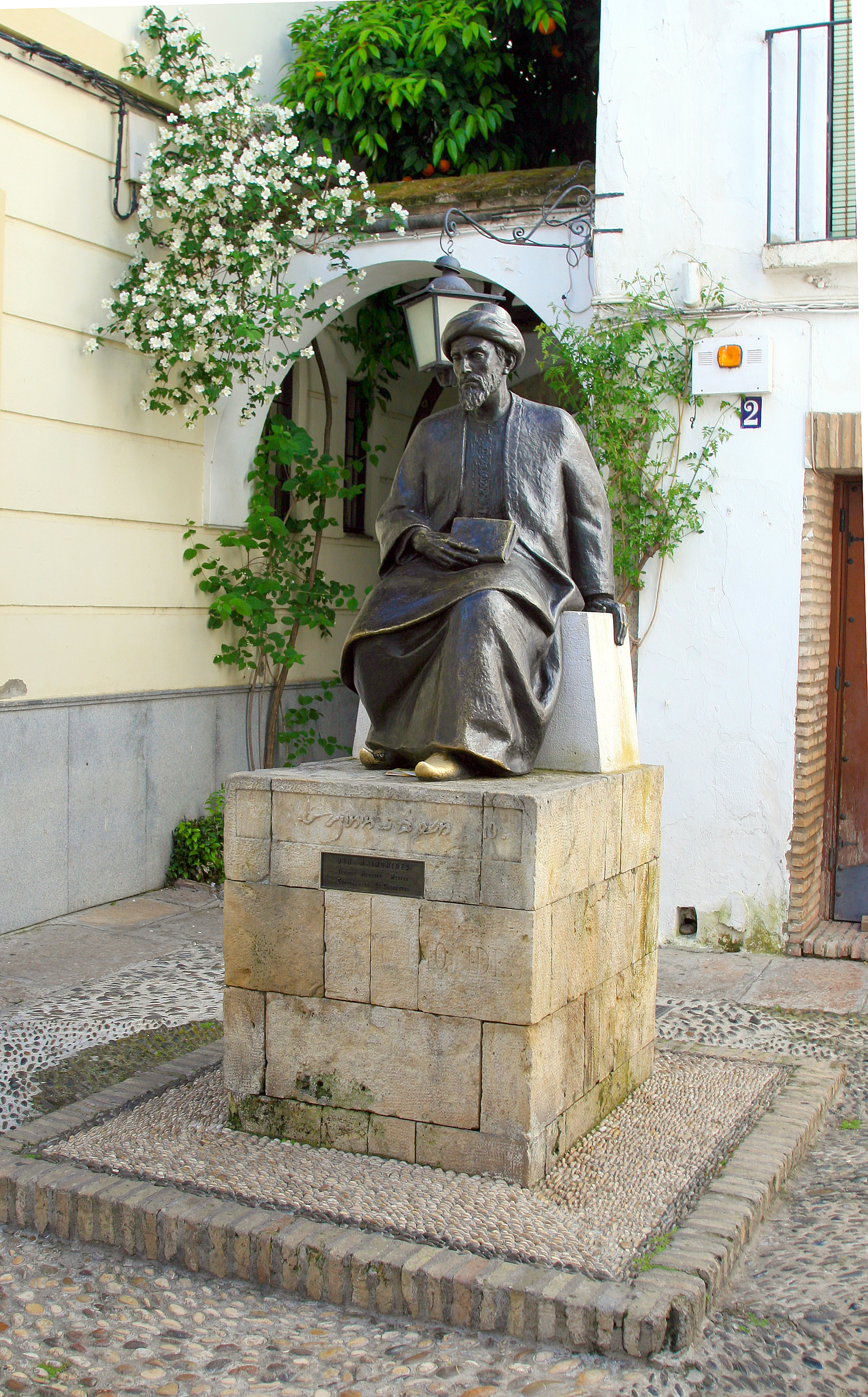
Statue of Maimonides in Tiberias Square

- Córdoba Synagogue, built in 1315 by Isaac Moheb.
- The Chapel of St. Bartholomew, built in 1399 to repopulate the neighborhood due to the anti-Jewish revolts.
- The Municipal Souk of Córdoba, a craft market located in a 15th century house.
- The Almodóvar Gate was part of the walls and was the limit of the Jewish quarter.
- In Tiberias Square is the statue of Maimonides, a Jewish philosopher born in Córdoba.
- The Andalusian House and the Alchemy Museum.
- The House of Sephards, a museum dedicated to Sephardic culture and the synagogue.
- The Municipal Bullfighting Museum
- The House of the Pavas, built in 1597 by Juan Sigler de Espinosa.
