= Roman walls of Córdoba =

Defensive fortification in Córdoba, Spain

Coordinates: 37°52′00″N 04°46′00″W

- Muralla Romana de Córdoba (Spanish)
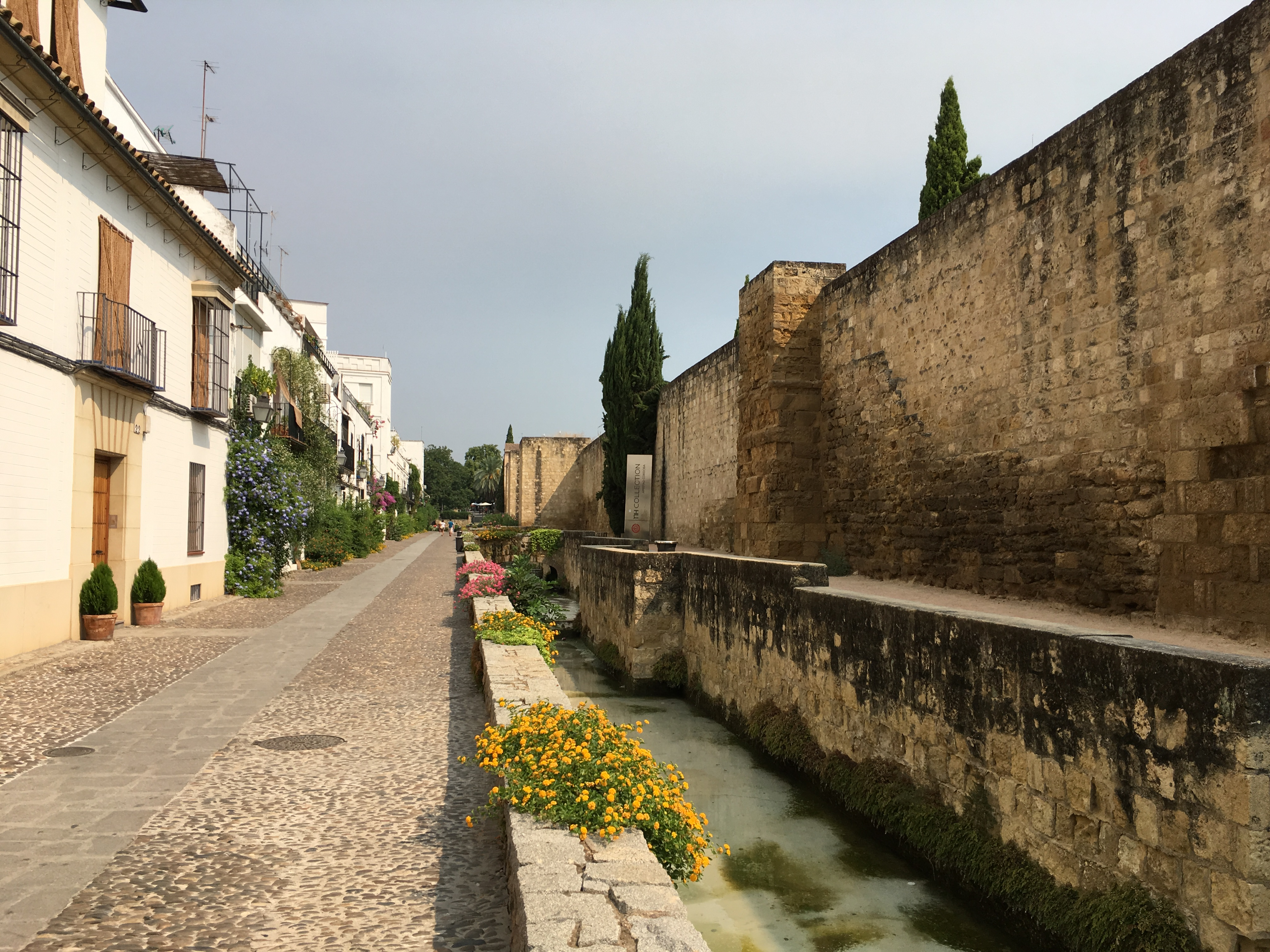
- City walls on Cairuan street
- Interactive map of Roman walls of Córdoba
- Type: Roman defensive walls
- Location: Córdoba, Spain

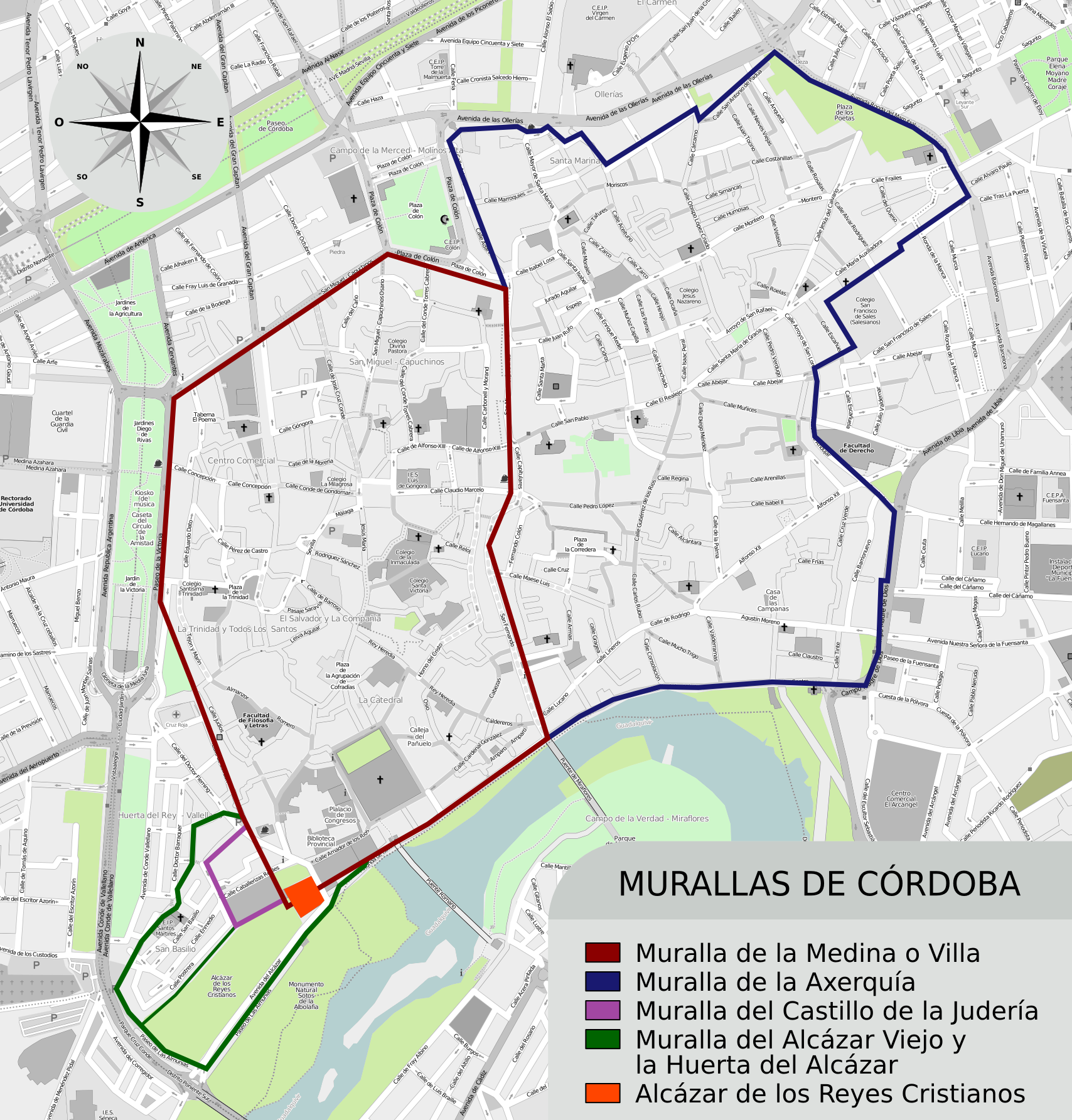
Walls of Córdoba: the Roman Walls on the left are dark red

The Roman Walls of Córdoba are the ancient Roman defensive walls of the Roman colonia of Corduba –present-day Córdoba, Spain–, capital of the Roman province of Hispania Baetica. Stretching 2,650 metres (8,690 ft), they were built after the Romans captured the city in 206 BC to defend the ancient Roman town as part of the Roman Republic. The sections of wall still standing and the rest of its vestiges, now form part of the historic center of Córdoba, a UNESCO World Heritage Site since 1984.

== Description ==
Built as fortifications soon after the Romans captured Córdoba, the walls stretched some 2,650 m (8,690 ft), completely surrounding the city. They consisted of carefully cut stone with an outer wall of up to 3 m (9.8 ft) high and a 1.2 m (3 ft 11 in) inner wall flanking a gap 6 m (20 ft) wide filled with rubble. There were several semicircular towers along the walls. When the city received the status of Colonia Patricia under Augustus, the southern wall was demolished in order to extend the city limits to the river. Vestiges remain in the Alcázar, near the Roman bridge, and flanking the Avenida de la Ribera. The walls next to Calle San Fernando and Calle Cairuán (restored in the 1950s) also have a base from this period. A section of the Roman wall can be seen from the street next to the Roman temple.

Roman gates included the Porta Principalis Sinistra (later Puerta de Gallegos) on the west side not far from the Roman mausoleum. The arches next to the Puerta de Sevilla to the east are part of a Roman aqueduct.
