= Hospital de San Sebastián =

16th-century building

Coordinates: 37.879056°N 4.780556°W

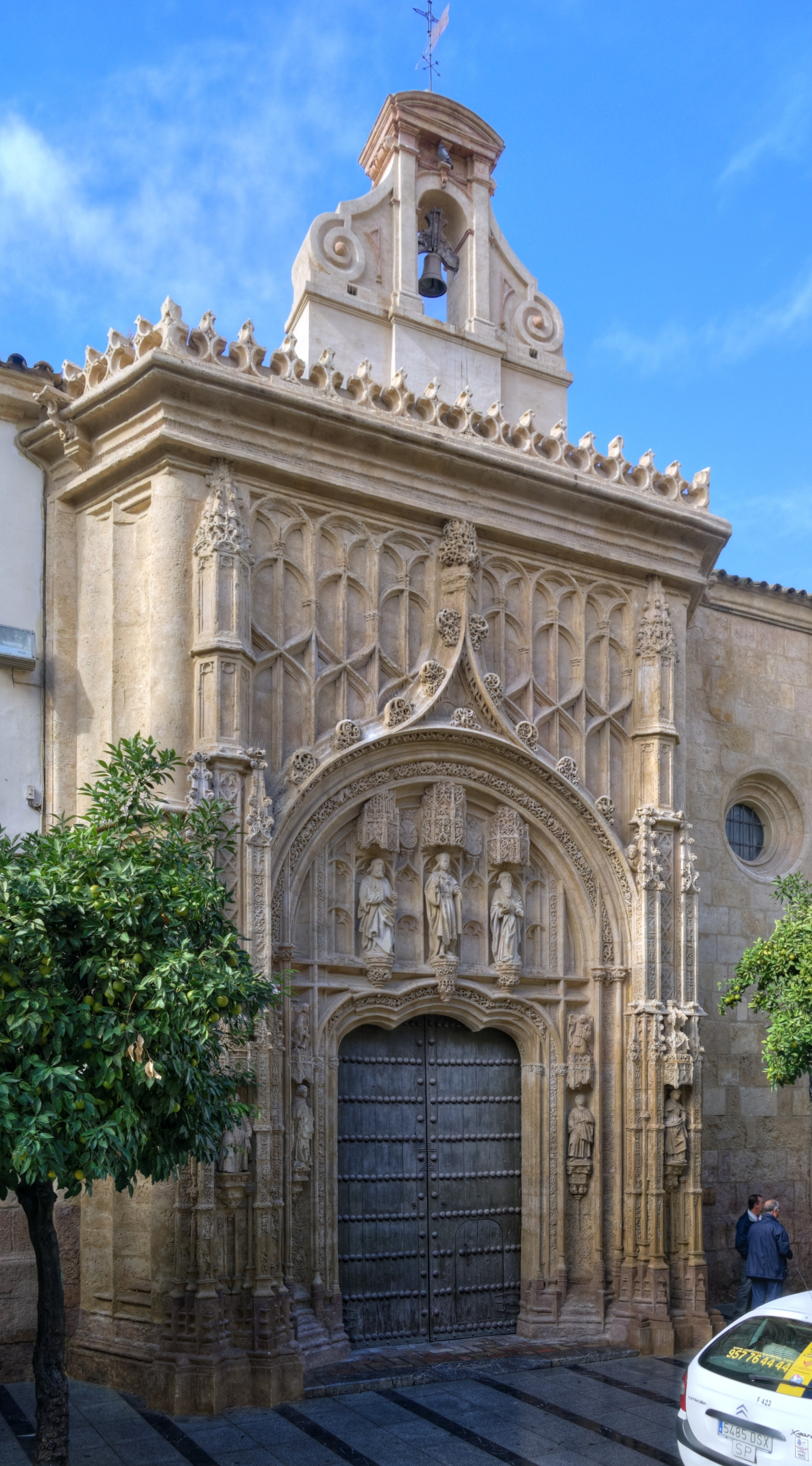
Palacio de Congresos in the San Sebastián Hospital building.

San Sebastián Hospital is a 16th-century building on Calle Torrijos in Córdoba, Spain. It is situated in the historic centre, just opposite the west front of the Mosque–Cathedral of Córdoba. Founded in 1363 in Alcayceria, it was moved in the early 16th century. Built to a design by Hernán Ruiz, el Viejo, construction on the current building occurred during the period of 1512-16. The building served as a hospital (1516-1816); a home for mothers and infants (1816-1961); and currently houses the Palace of Congresses and Exhibitions, as well as the Office of Tourism.
