= Convento de Santa Cruz (Córdoba) =

Convent in Andalusia, Spain

Coordinates: 37°52′54″N 4°46′14″W

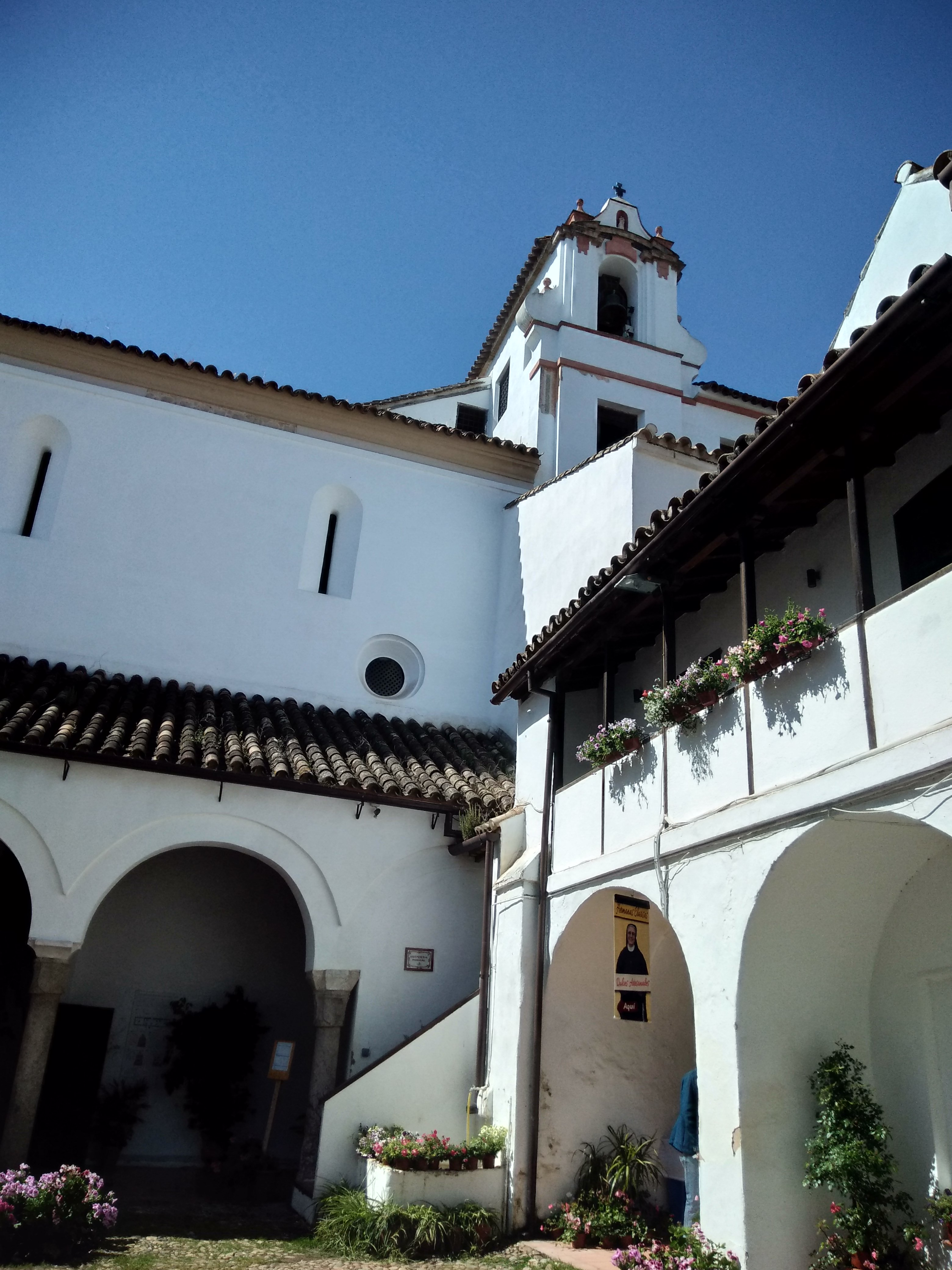
Convento Santa Cruz Córdoba

Convento de Santa Cruz is a convent situated in the historic centre, barrio de San Pedro, Córdoba, Andalusia, Spain. It was founded in 1435, by Pedro de los Ríos y Gutiérrez de Aguayo and his wife, Teresa Zurita. The building has always been closely linked to the Ríos family, which were adding new spaces to the original project, resulting in an interesting building composed of different structures organized around courtyards. It is notable for its originality, its architecture, and the artistic setting. These include the cloister, convent, church, house of the novices of the eighteenth century, and courtyard. In the main structure, there are architectural elements in Roman, Muslim, Moorish and baroque styles, which witness the historic and artistic development of Córdoba. The retablos which decorate the church interior, tiling, and paintings are of note. It was declared a Bien de Interés Cultural site in 2011.
