= San Bartolomé, Córdoba =

Cultural property in Córdoba, Spain

Coordinates: 37°52′47″N 04°46′57″W

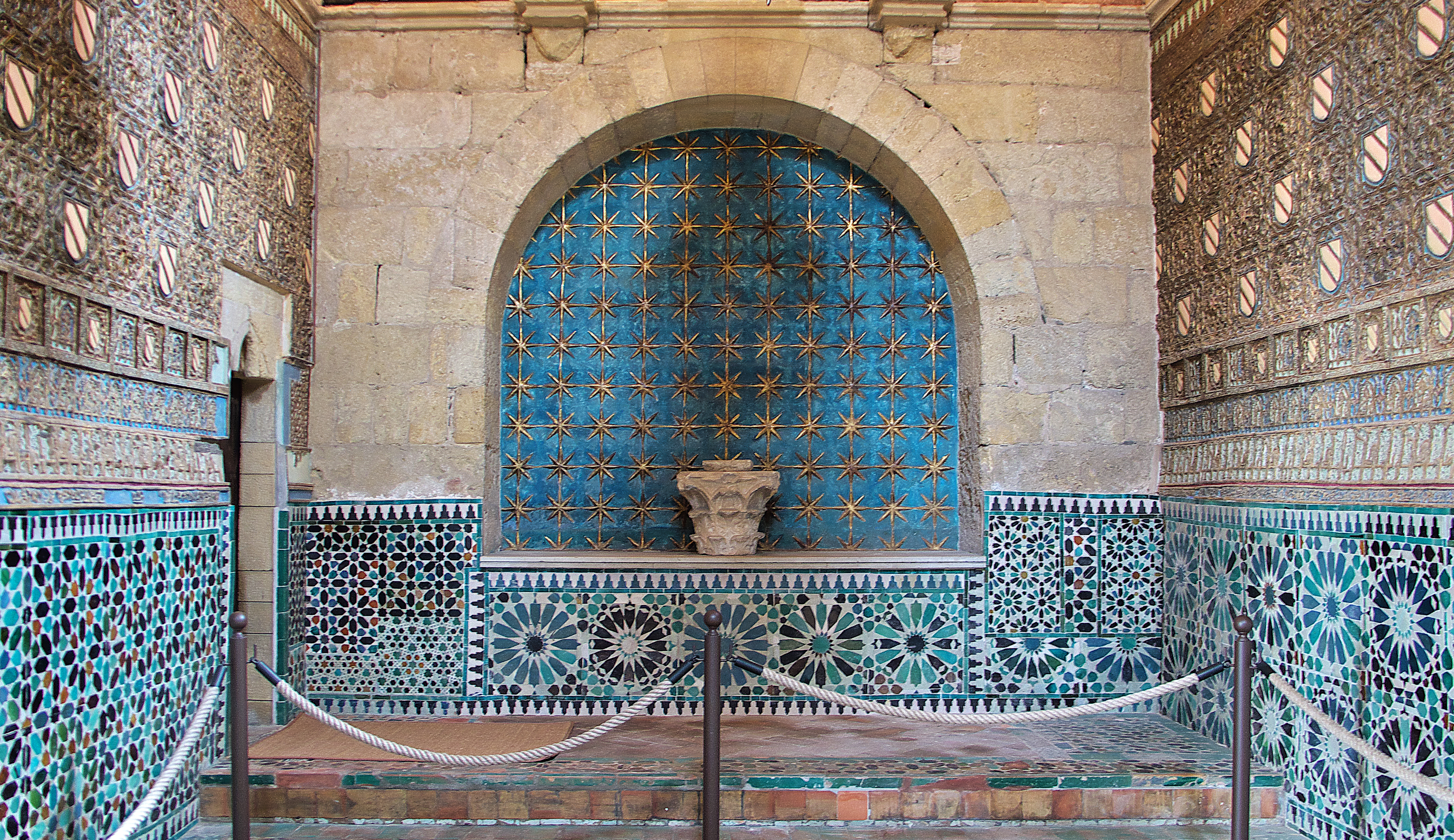
Chapel of San Bartolomé

The Chapel of San Bartolomé (Spanish: Capilla de San Bartolomé) is a funerary chapel in the historic centre of Córdoba, Spain. It is dated between 1390 and 1410. Richly decorated, it is one of the city's finest examples of Mudéjar art.

== History ==
Located on the Calle Averroes in today's Faculty of Arts building, the relatively unknown chapel is one of the city's most notable monuments. With the development of the Alcázar Viejo district in 1391 and the later expulsion of the Jews from La Judería, the parish of San Bartolomé was established while a church of the same name was constructed between 1399 and 1410. The little building continued to operate as a parish church until the 17th century, possibly awaiting completion of a larger church. Restored in 1953 and 2006, the chapel is a fine example of ancient Mudéjar art.

== Architecture ==
Rectangular in shape, the area is divided into two sections, one for the chapel itself, the other for a courtyard. Built of rusticated sandstone, the chapel has a rectangular floor measuring 9 m (30 ft) by 5 m (16 ft). The chancel is slightly higher than the remainder of the building. There are two doors, one through a porch opening into a courtyard on Calle Averroes, the second, strangely locked from the outside, providing access into a side chapel which may have been connected to a sacristy in another building.

The entrance from the courtyard has a pointed arch with a few simple decorations while the other entrance, also pointed, has zigzag or sawtooth decorations. Two small columns bearing Islamic decorations with scrolls and leaves support the elegantly rib-vaulted ceiling. The interior walls are richly decorated with yeseria plasterwork and tiling while the floor is also decorated with alternating tiles. The wall decorations combine depictions of plants, geometric patterns and heraldry. The coats of arms belong to the Knights of the Band, an order created by King Alfonso XI. Inscriptions are in both Kufic and Naskh scripts.

== Listing ==
The chapel has been listed as a historic monument since 1931.
