= Roman temple of Córdoba =

Spanish archeological site

Coordinates: 37°53′05″N 04°46′35″W

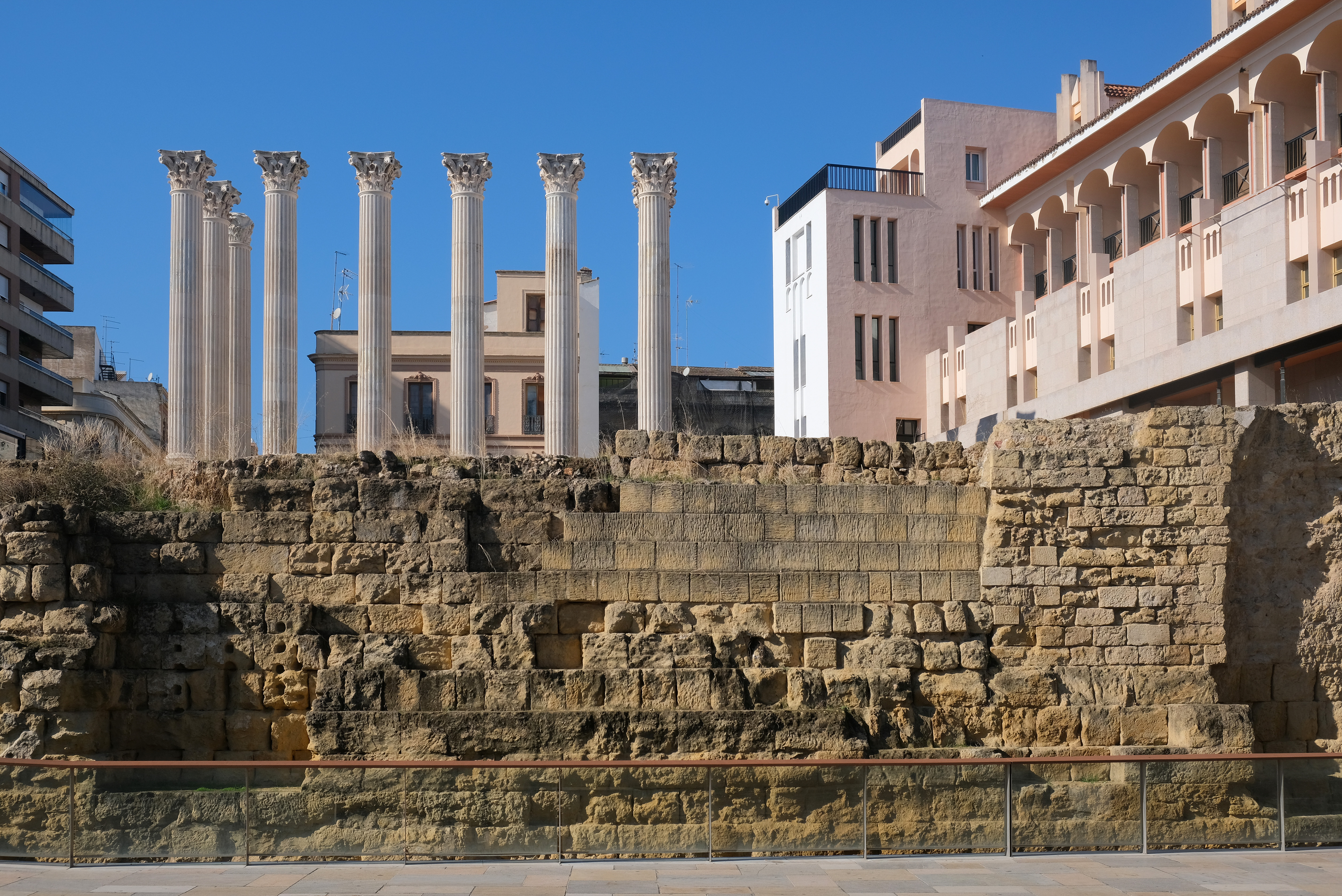
The remnants of the temple.

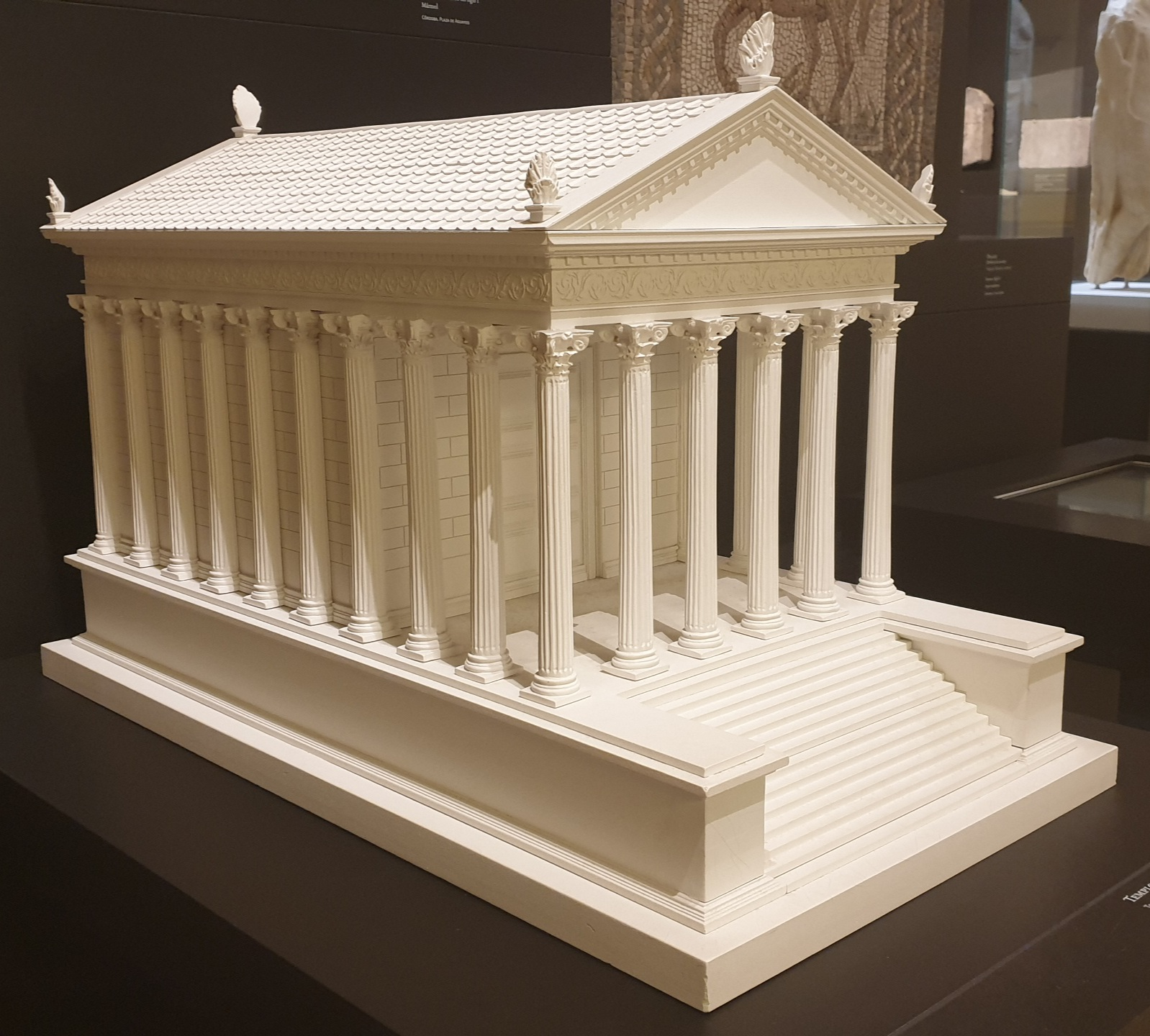
Reconstruction of the Roman temple of Córdoba.

The Spanish city of Córdoba has the remains of a Roman temple, which was discovered in the 1950s during the expansion of City Hall. It is located in the angle formed by the streets Claudio Marcelo and Capitulares. It was not the only temple that the city had, but it was possibly the most important of all, and the only known by archaeological excavation. It is a Pseudoperipterus, hexastyle and of Corinthian order temple of 32 meters long and 16 wide.

Its construction began during the reign of Emperor Claudius (41–54 AD) and ended some forty years later, during the reign of Emperor Domitian (81–96 CE). Presumably it was dedicated to the imperial cult. The temple underwent some changes in the 2nd century, reforms that coincide with the relocation of the colonial forum.

In the area had already been found architectural elements, such as drums of columns, capitals, etc. all in marble, so the area was known as los marmolejos. This area of Córdoba could become between the 1st century and the 2nd century, as the provincial forum of the Colonia Patricia, title that received the city during the Roman rule.

== Historical overview ==
The temple was built during the second half of the 1st century. The set was begun during the reign of Emperor Claudius but was not finished until the reign of Domitian, at which time it was provided with water. It underwent some modifications in the 2nd century, reforms that seem to coincide with the relocation of the provincial forum to the current environment of the Convento de Santa Ana. The materials used in its construction were varied.

The material used was almost exclusively marble, from columns to the walls, going through the roof and entablature. The quality and size of the marble indicates that its construction was carried out by skilled craftsmen of high quality, placing the result at the level of the most beautiful buildings of the empire.

The temple stood at the edge of Colonia Patricia, at the edge of the western walls. A small stretch of the wall was destroyed to build the temple. The land was cleared and leveled, creating a square artificial terrace at the center of which stood the temple.

The square was closed on three of its sides, north, east and south (as indicated by the remains found under the building at the corner of Calle Claudio Marcelo with Calle Diario Córdoba), while the west was open to visually connect with the circus.

Some studies suggest that there was an intermediate terrace that interconnected the two spaces.

If still in use by the 4th-century, the temple would have been closed during the persecution of pagans under the Christian emperors.

== Description ==
It is a hexastyle temple standing 9 meters tall, situated on a podium measuring 3.5 meters in height. The temple was composed of six columns on its front façade and ten columns on each side. Currently, the only remains of the building are its foundation, the staircase, the altar, and some column shafts and capitals. The most notable part of the complex is the foundation: those that supported the building itself and the front buttresses, arranged in a fan shape and resting on a wall, part of which is currently visible in the Town Hall. These structures provided support to prevent displacement due to the weight of the entire structure, which was entirely constructed in marble. This type of anchoring, recommended by Vitruvius and called antérides, was not common throughout the Empire, adding unique value to the Cordoban complex. The antérides, along with the temple's massive foundations, hint at the grand scale the temple must have had. It would have been prominently visible from the Via Augusta, the main eastern entrance route, which ran parallel to the circus.

The material used was almost exclusively marble, from the columns to the walls, the roof, and the entablature. The quality of the marble and its craftsmanship indicate that its construction was carried out by highly skilled artisans, placing the result on par with the most beautiful buildings of the empire.

Around the site, some original fragments of the temple, such as drum pieces or capitals, can be seen. Other remnants were taken to the Archaeological and Ethnological Museum of Córdoba for better preservation, like some reliefs displayed there, and where some of its capitals are also located. Meanwhile, several shafts of its columns can be observed in the Plaza de las Doblas.

== Current situation ==
The building was situated on a podium and consisted of six columns on its front facade and ten columns on each side. Currently, the only remains left of the building are its foundation, the stairs, the altar and some shafts of columns and capitals.

On March 27, 2017, the first phase of the Tourist Plan was launched. The restoration works included the removal of the black layer that covered the monument and the beautification of the area, with the works being completed on July 31, 2017. The second phase was awarded in April 2018, which included the creation of a platform to allow access to the area for tourist visits and the establishment of an interpretation center. However, even though the works began, a few months later, the construction company entered into bankruptcy, and the work was suspended, awaiting the resolution of the contract to put it out for tender again.

== See also ==
- List of Ancient Roman temples
- List of Roman sites in Spain
- Baetica
