= List of Bienes de Interés Cultural in the Province of Córdoba =

This is a list of Bien de Interés Cultural landmarks in the Province of Córdoba, Spain.

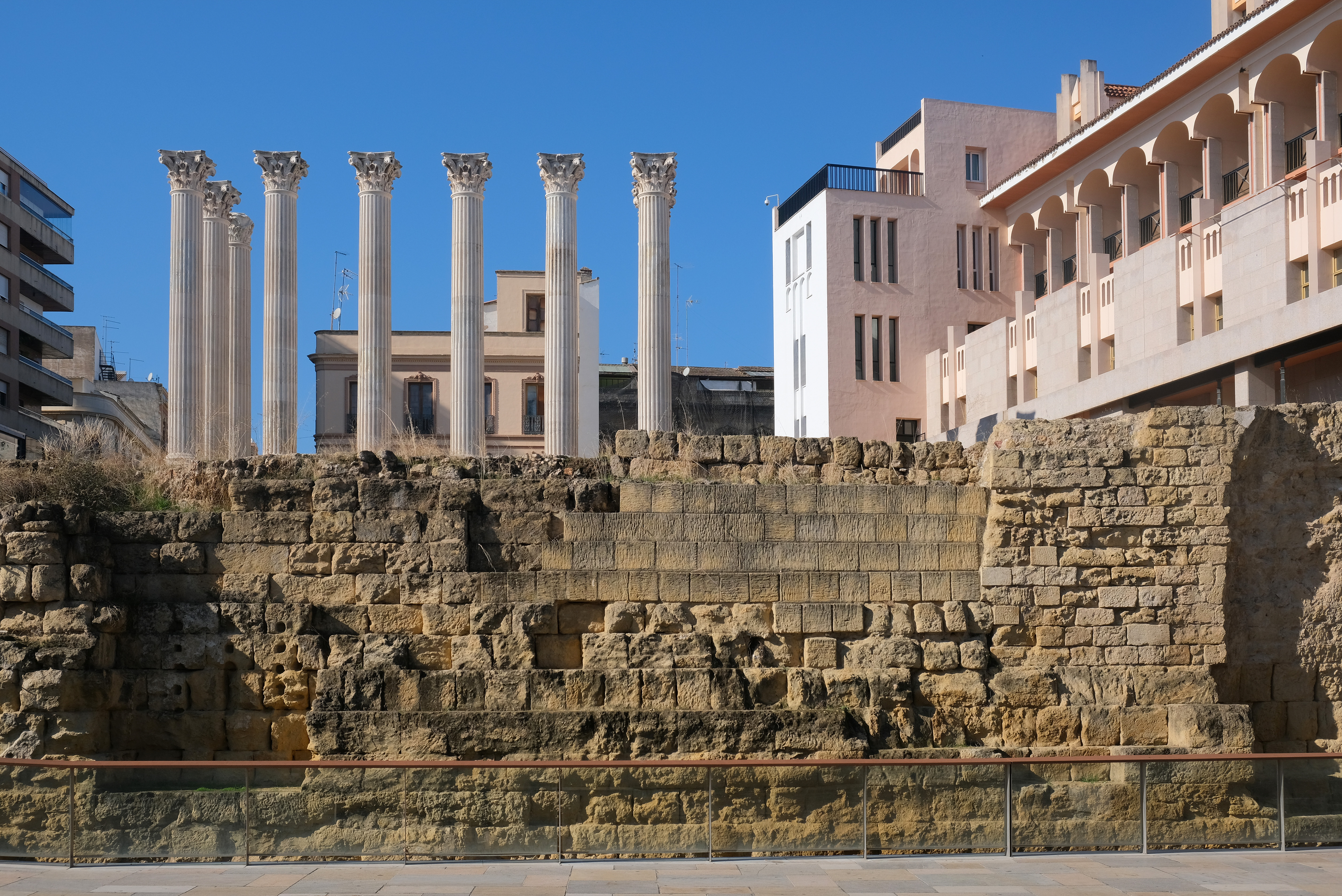
The Roman temple of Córdoba.

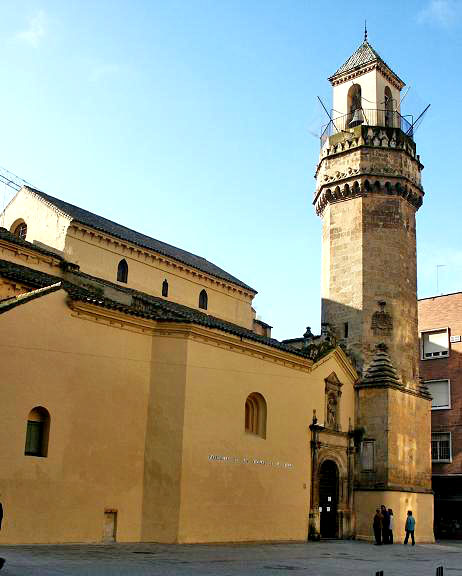
The San Nicolás de la Villa church.

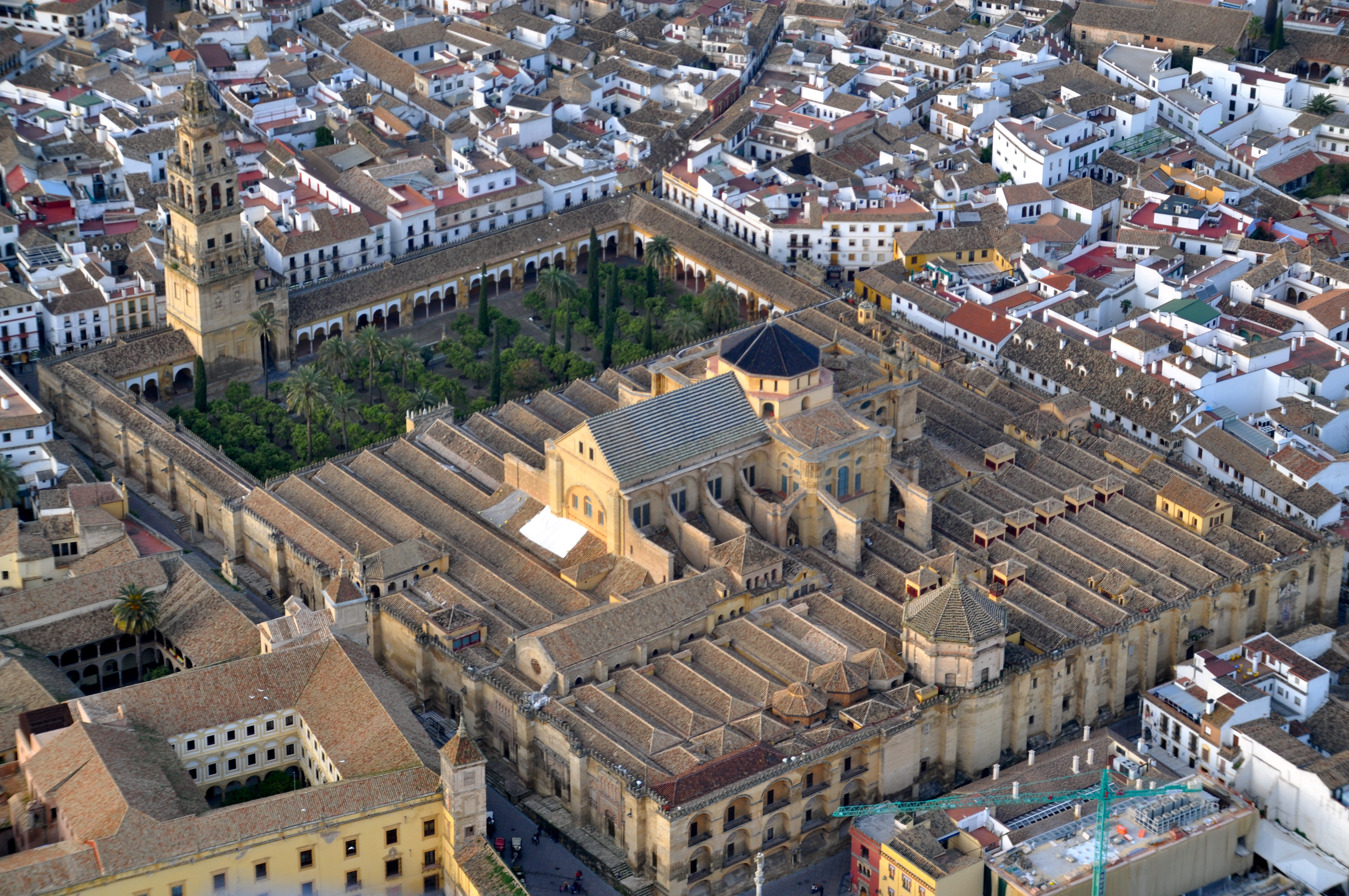
The Mosque–Cathedral of Córdoba is also a World Heritage Site.

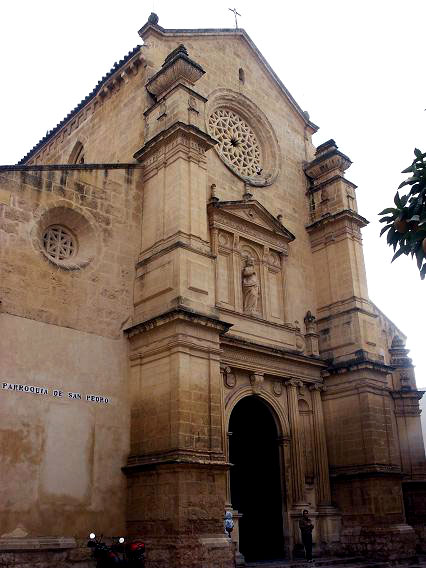
San Pedro church.

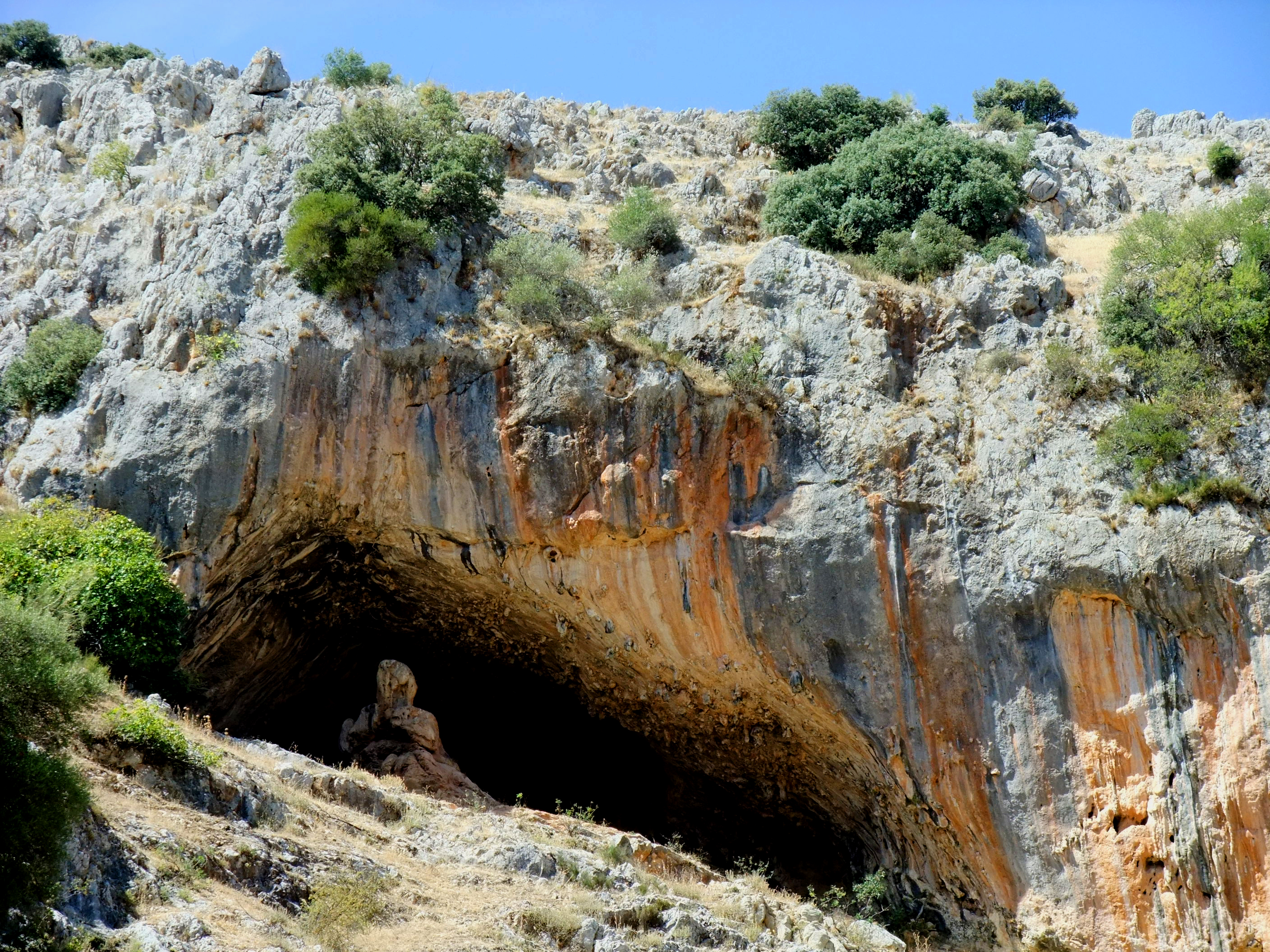
Cueva de los Murciélagos.

- Alcázar de los Reyes Cristianos
- Calahorra Tower
- Castle of Belalcázar
- Castle of Bujalance
- Castillo de las Escobetas
- Castillo de Iznájar
- Córdoba Synagogue
- Minaret of the Convento de Santa Clara (Córdoba)
- Convento de Santa Cruz
- Cueva de los Murciélagos
- Medina Azahara
- Mosque–Cathedral of Córdoba
- Nuestra Señora de la Asunción, Bujalance
- Palacio de la Merced
- Plaza del Potro
- Puerta del Puente
- Roman bridge of Córdoba
- Roman temple of Córdoba
- San Lorenzo
- San Miguel, Córdoba
- San Nicolás de la Villa
- San Pablo
- San Pedro
- Santa Marina
