= Alto Guadalquivir =

Coordinates: 37°57′27″N 4°25′26″W

- Comarca
- Country: Spain
- Autonomous community: Andalusia
- Province: Córdoba
- Municipalities: List: Adamuz, Bujalance, Cañete de las Torres, El Carpio, Montoro, Pedro Abad, Villa del Río, Villafranca de Córdoba

Area
  - Total: 1,299 km^{2} (502 sq mi)

Population (2009)
  - Total: 44,931
  - Density: 34.59/km^{2} (89.58/sq mi)
- Time zone: UTC+1 (CET)
  - Summer (DST): UTC+2 (CEST)
- Largest municipality: Montoro

Alto Guadalquivir is a Spanish comarca in the province of Córdoba. It covers an area of 1,299 km², and has a population of 44,828 inhabitants (INE 2008). It borders the comarca of Valle de los Pedroches to the North; Campiña Este - Guadajoz to the South; Córdoba and the comarca of Valle del Guadiato to the West; and the province of Jaén to the East.

The territory is primarily agricultural, though the construction of furniture made with wood from Villa del Río is growing in popularity, as is the boiler works industry in Montoro and Bujalance.

The comarca can be divided into three territories based on geography, from North to South:

- the mountain area (Adamuz and Montoro). Located in the foothills of the Sierra Morena, this region contains a number of important waterways, namely estuaries of the Guadalmellato, Yeguas, and Martín GonzaloMartín Gonzalo streams. It is also the location of several nature reserves, including the Parque Natural Sierra de Cardeña Montoro.
- The lowlands (Villa del Río, Pedro Abad, El Carpio, and Villafranca de Córdoba). Situated about the rivera del Guadalquivir, the Andalusian autovía (N-IV), and the Madrid-Cádiz railroad line, this zone is home to 70% of the population of the comarca.
- The countryside (Bujalance and Cañete de las Torres), the agricultural center of the comarca. A large, fertile territory, its predominant crops are olives, wheat, and sunflowers.
