= Diego López Bueno =

Spanish architect and sculptor

Diego López Bueno (1568 - 1632) was a Spanish architect, sculptor, and altarpiece constructor.

== Biography ==
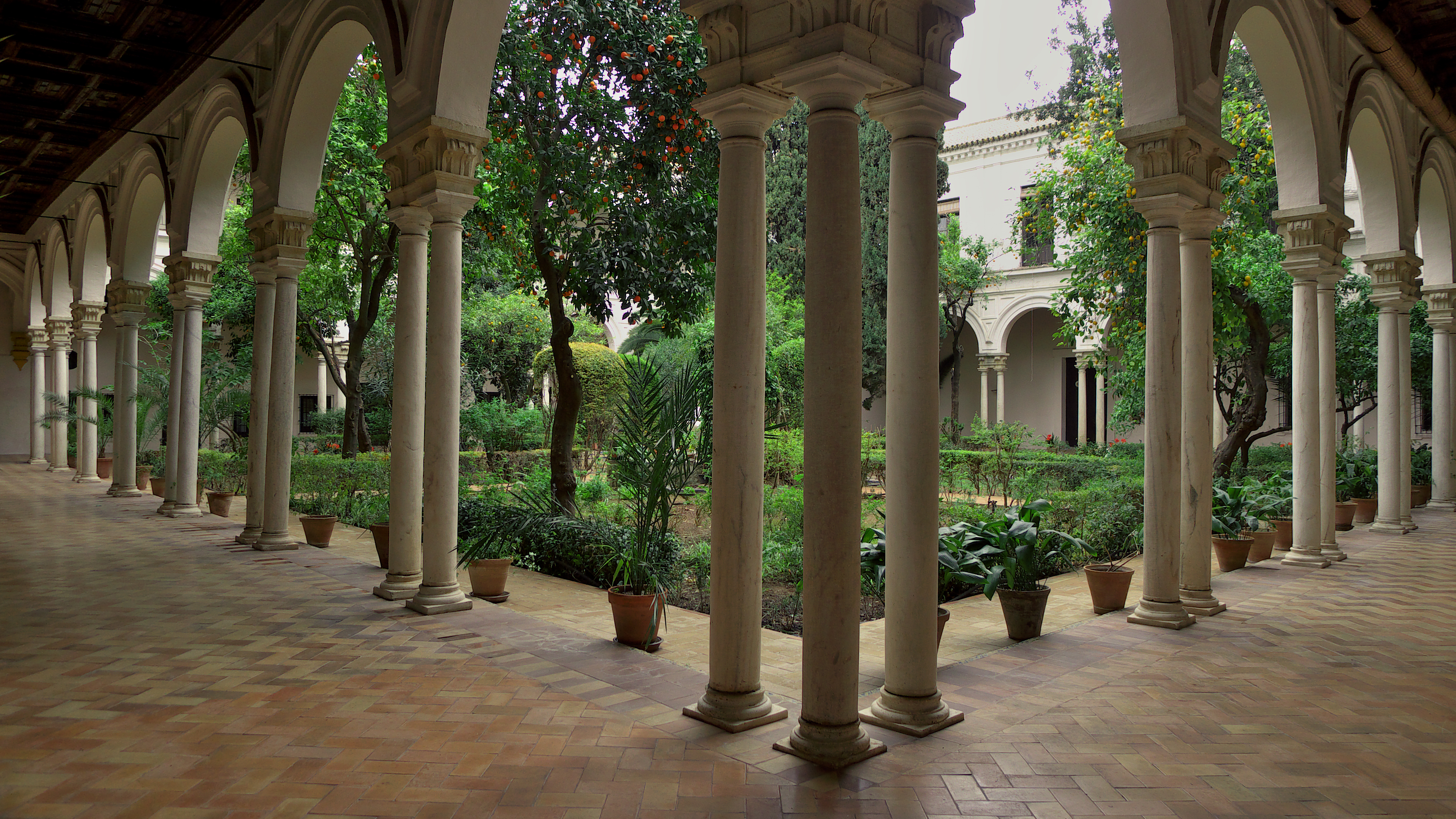
Monastery of St Clement (Seville)

He began his career as an architect in Seville in which he took inspiration from Hernán Ruiz the Younger. Bueno made his most prominent pieces in the early seventeenth century.

An accomplished altarpiece constructor, he left a large number of works in this field. many of his altarpieces were pictorial and used lots of imagery, He usually did not design but built these pieces and he worked with other artists such as Francisco Pacheco. Although most of his pieces were made and eventually used in churches in Spain, some of his pieces made it into the Spanish colonies in the Americas, and a few of his altarpieces made it into missions and colonial churches in Panama. One of his more significant pieces was the main altarpiece for the church at Hospital de las Cinco Llagas. An altarpiece at the church of Santiago el Mayor is also attributed to him. Bueno also made wooden statues and sculptures, with the most prominent being a sculpture of Saint Peter and Saint Paul and another one depicting the Immaculate Conception. Bueno also got hired to work on the funerary monument of Philip II of Spain

In 1612, he was hired by the Catholic Church to officially distribute altarpieces and other artwork for the Roman Catholic Archdiocese of Seville. He collaborated with several other architects to make pieces in the Alcázar of Seville and continued to make altarpieces and statues onwards until his death in 1632.
