= Algallarín =

Coordinates: 38.0001°N 4.4553°W

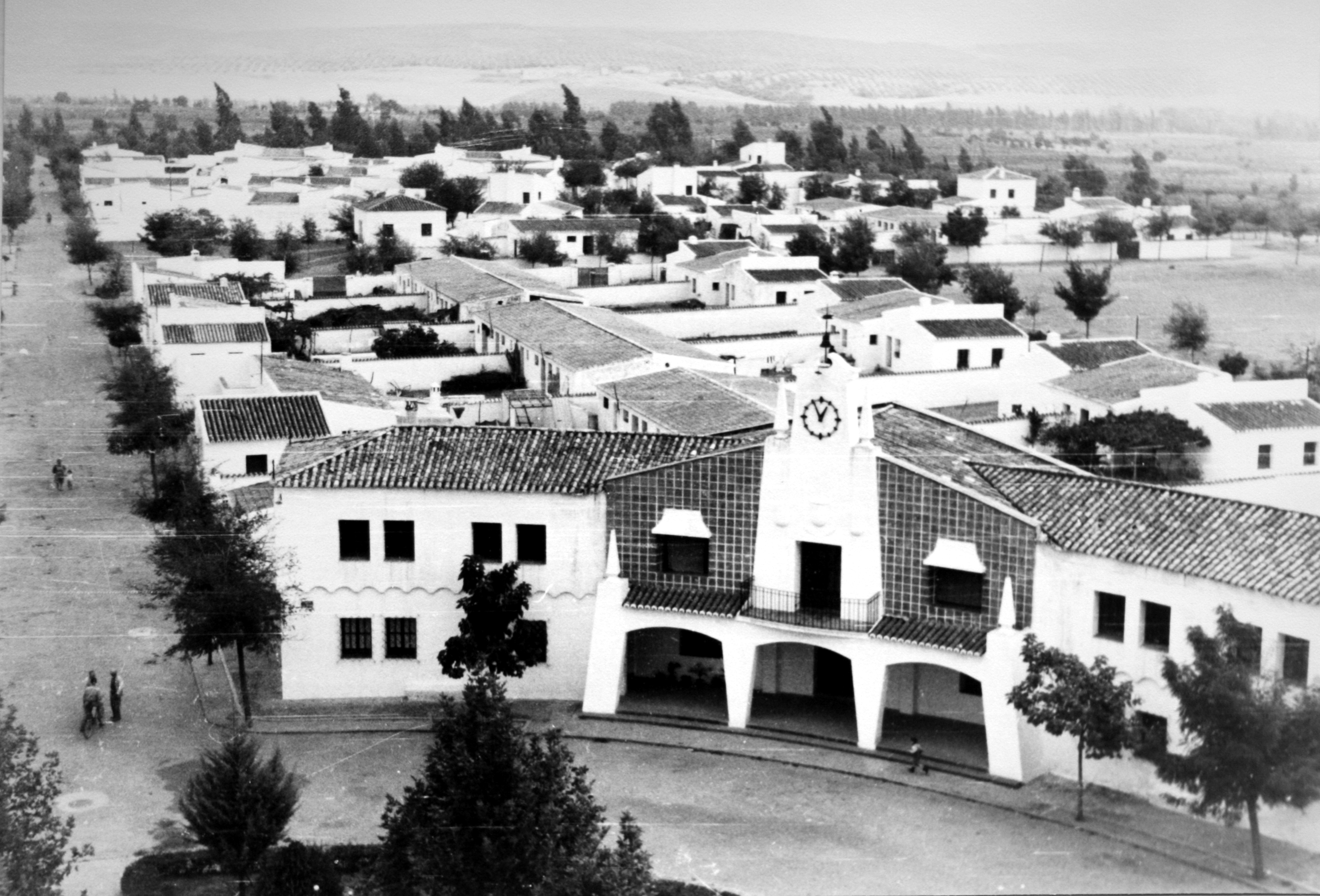
- The village with its ayuntamiento (town hall) in the foreground
- Interactive map of Algallarín
- Country: Spain
- Province: Córdoba
- Municipality: Adamuz
- Comarca: Alto Guadalquivir

Area
  - Total: 3.058 km^{2} (1.181 sq mi)
- Elevation: 210 m (690 ft)

Population (2014)
  - Total: 610

Algallarín is a village in Córdoba, Andalusia, Spain. It is part of the municipality of Adamuz.

== History ==
It was designed as a model village by the modernist architect Carlos Arniches. The project was developed in the 1950s under the auspices of the Instituto Nacional de Colonización.

== Notable people ==
- Francisco Regalón (born 19 February 1987) is a Spanish professional footballer who plays for CD Numancia
