= Belalcázar =

Belalcázar may refer to:

- Belalcázar, Spain, a municipality in the province of Córdoba, southern Spain
  - Castle of Belalcázar, a Gothic castle in the Spanish city
- Belalcázar, Caldas, a town and municipality in the Colombian department of Caldas
- Belalcázar, Cauca, seat of the Páez Municipality in Colombia
- Sebastián de Belalcázar (1479/80–1551), a Spanish conquistador
- Bréiner Belalcázar (born 1984), a Colombian footballer
