= Nuestra Señora de la Asunción, Bujalance =

Roman Catholic Church in Andalusia, Spain

Coordinates: 37°53′47″N 4°23′0″W

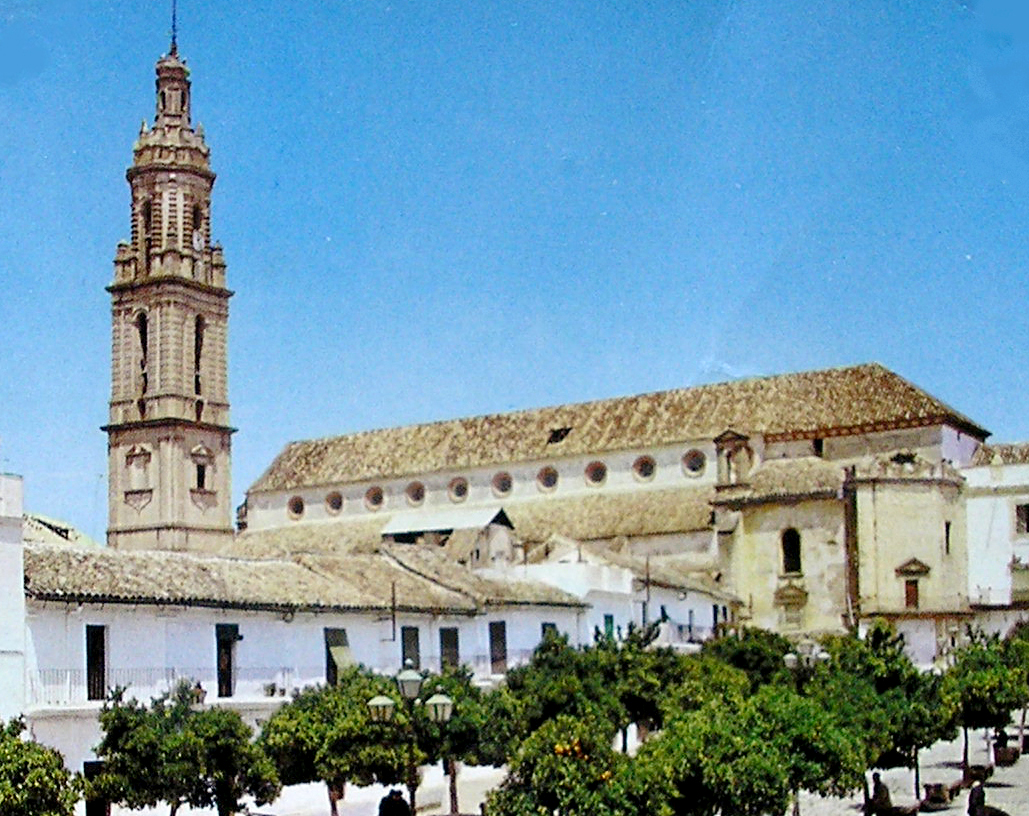
Nuestra Señora de la Asunción.

Nuestra Señora de la Asunción (also known as Catedral de la Campina, Spanish for "Cathedral of the Countryside") is a Roman Catholic church in Bujalance, Andalusia, southern Spain.

It originates from the church of Santa Maria, which was built above the medieval mosque, near the town's Alcazaba, after the area had been conquered by Ferdinand III of Castile. The edifice is in Gothic-Renaissance style, with ogival arcades and pillars attributed to Hernán Ruiz the Elder, Hernán Ruiz the Younger (1556) and Hernán Ruiz III. The Gothic cross-vault ceiling is the oldest part of the church.

The Renaissance high altar (16th century) is attributed to Guillermo de Orta and Andrés de Castillejo, with paintings by Leonardo Enríquez de Navarra. Next to the altar is a small hexagonal chapel in Baroque style, from the early 18th century. Other artworks include the Roccoco case by the Cordoban goldsmith Damián de Castro, a large canvas of the Battle of Lepanto and a side Baroque portal in pink marble.

The tilting tower, begun in 1611 and finished in 1788, has a height of 55 meters.
