= San Pablo, Córdoba =

Church in Andalusia, Spain

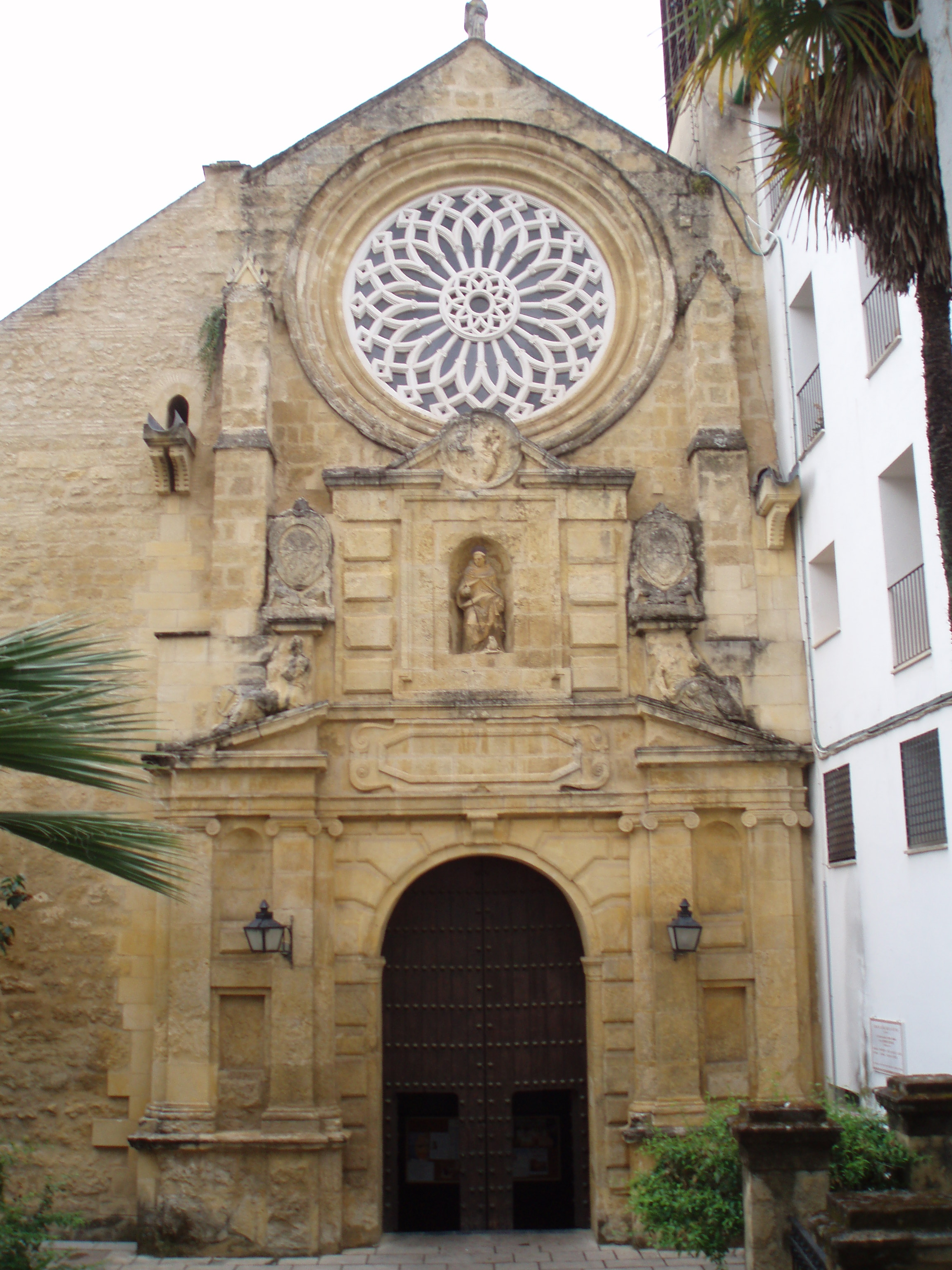
Façade of the church.

San Pablo is a church and former convent in Córdoba, Andalusia, southern Spain. The present church and defunct convent were built on a space that always harbored large buildings for its location at the door of the city along one of the main access roads. A Roman Circus predated a Muslim palace before Almohad Christians built a Dominican convent.

== Architecture and fittings ==
The church has Baroque features made in marble dating to 1708. The main facade features the Mannerist style of the 16th century. The interior consists of three naves divided by pillars covered with coffered Mudéjar ornamentation. There are three apses, circular on the inside and rectangular on the outside, with a quarter-sphere dome, and central pentagonal vault. The tower is located at the foot of the church and is of stone, upon which stands the wooden bell tower.

In the nave of the Gospel, there is a pointed flaring arch, with caliphal capitals, leading into San Pablo Street. In the nave of the Epistle, there is an old door of Gothic-Mudejar style. Among the preserved chapels is the Chapel of the Madonna del Rosario, built in the 15th century and renovated in 1758, which is an example of Baroque Cordoba. Remains of the cloister of the convent can be seen embedded in the passage that leads to the Ministry of Culture on Capitulares Street. The chapter house, designed by Hernán Ruiz II, was possibly unfinished for lack of funds. Restoration and refurbishment of the building occurred in 2008 as part of an earmark for the cultural area of the city. One of the most important sculptures of Easter Cordoba, Our Lady of Sorrows, is by Juan de Mesa and dates to 1627.

== Grounds ==
In the Jardines de Orive are the grounds of the former convent garden. The site's gardens are mentioned as early as 1409.

== See also ==
- List of carillons
- High medieval domes
