= Hospital de las Cinco Llagas =

Building in Seville, Spain

Coordinates: 37°24′17.41″N 5°59′17.51″W

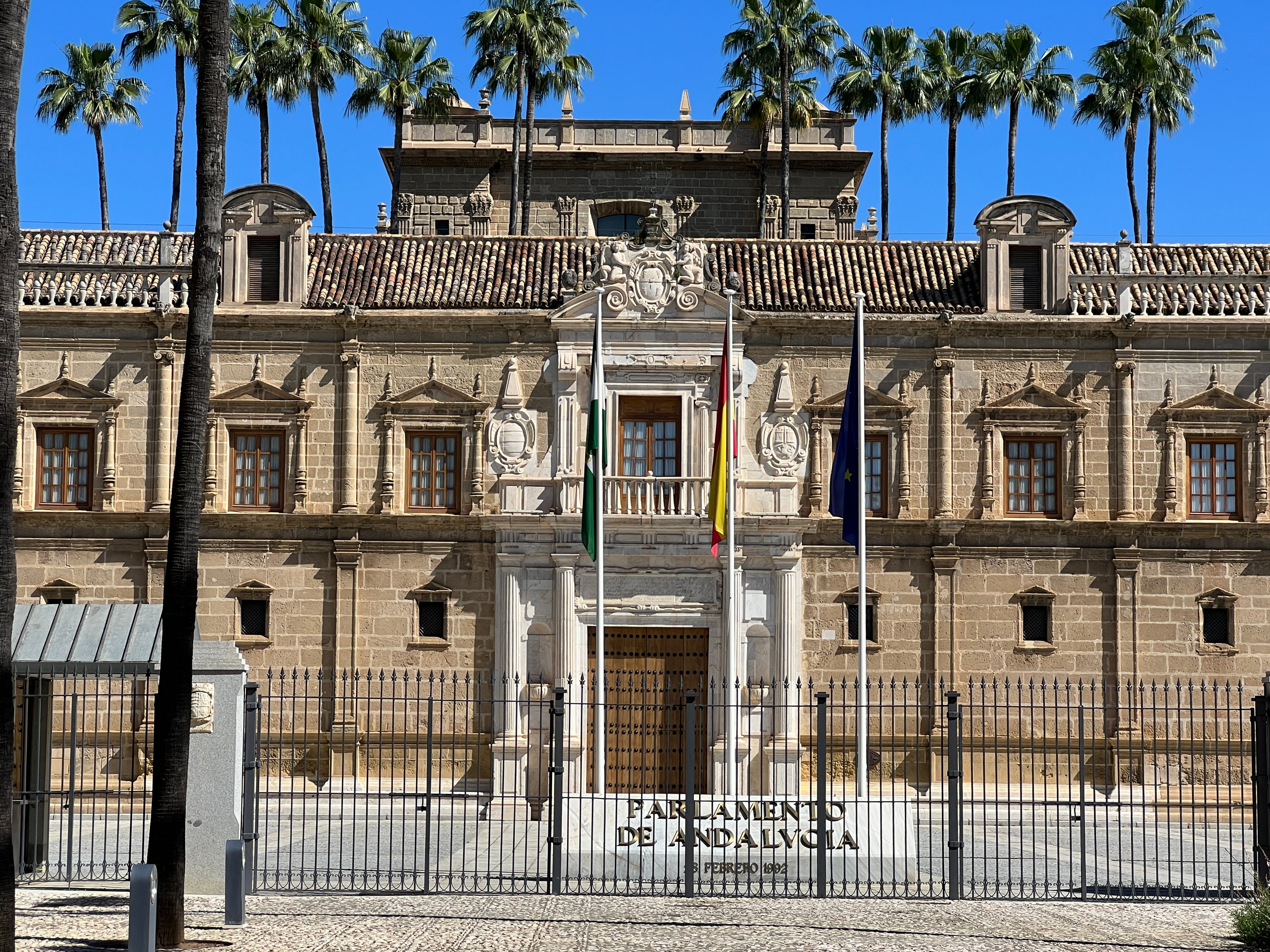
Main façade of the Hospital de las Cinco Llagas, seat of the Parliament of Andalusia.

The Hospital de las Cinco Llagas (literally "Hospital of the Five Wounds") in Seville, Spain is the current seat of the Parliament of Andalusia.

== History ==
Construction of the building began in 1546, as a legacy of Don Fadrique Enríquez de Ribera, who had died in 1539. It was designed by Martín de Gainza, who directed the construction until his death in 1556. Two years later, Hernán Ruiz II took over the works, and the building was inaugurated, although still incomplete, in 1558.

The building is on a rectangular plan, originally intended to be built around 10 courtyards, of which only nine were constructed and only eight survive as of the early 21st century. The most distinctive element of the building is its church, situated in the central courtyard of the left side. It is built on a Latin cross plan and is broadly in the style of the Spanish Renaissance. Its distinguished main altarpiece was designed by Diego López Bueno with paintings by Alonso Vázquez based on designs by Asensio de Maeda. The church is taller than the rest of the building. Its interior is now the site of the plenary sessions of the Andalusian parliament.

The building functioned as a hospital until 1972. After it had been left unused for several years, in 1986 plans were drawn up to convert it to the seat of the parliament of the autonomous community of Andalusia. It was inaugurated 28 February 1992, the Andalusia Day, with restoration work still in progress. The restoration was completed in 2003, with the conclusion of the work on those courtyards and rooms not restored in the 1980s.
