= San Lorenzo, Córdoba =

Church in Córdoba, Spain

Coordinates: 37°53′18″N 04°46′07″W

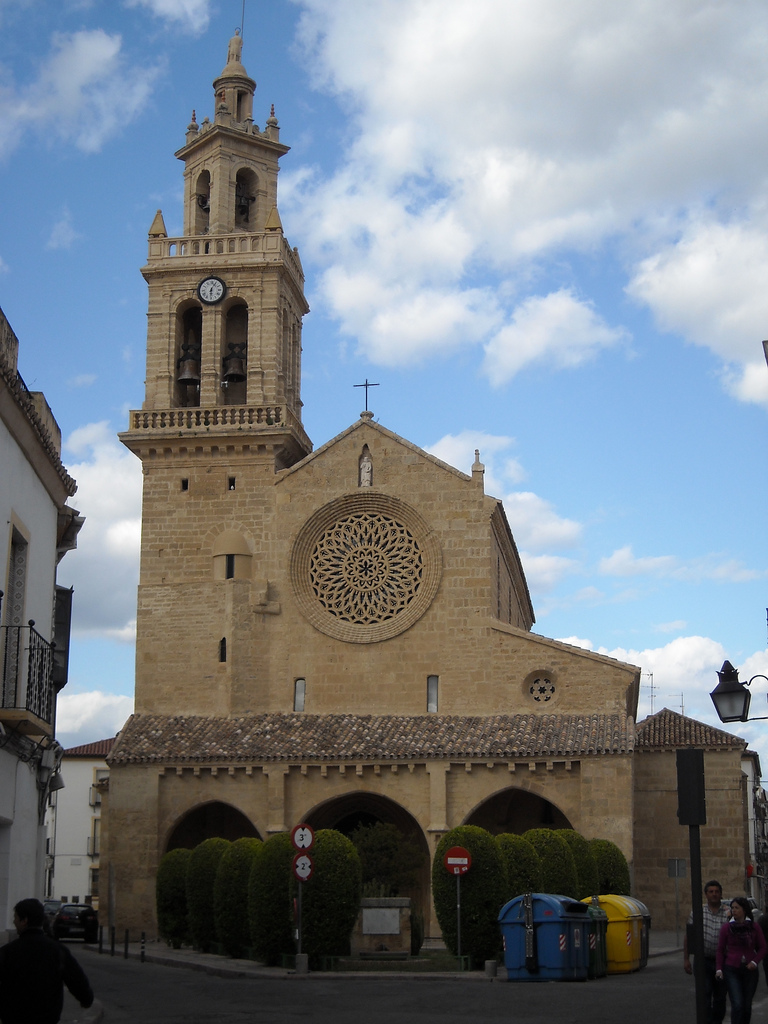
San Lorenzo.

San Lorenzo is a church in Córdoba, Andalusia, southern Spain. Situated in the historic centre, it was one of the twelve religious buildings commissioned by King Ferdinand III of Castile in the city after its conquest in the early 13th century.

The church occupies the site of a pre-existing Islamic mosque, which in turn had been built above a Visigothic church. It was built between around 1244 and 1300, in a transitional style between Romanesque and Gothic architecture. It has the typical structure of Andalusian churches of the period, featuring a rectangular plan with a nave and two aisles, without transept and an apse.

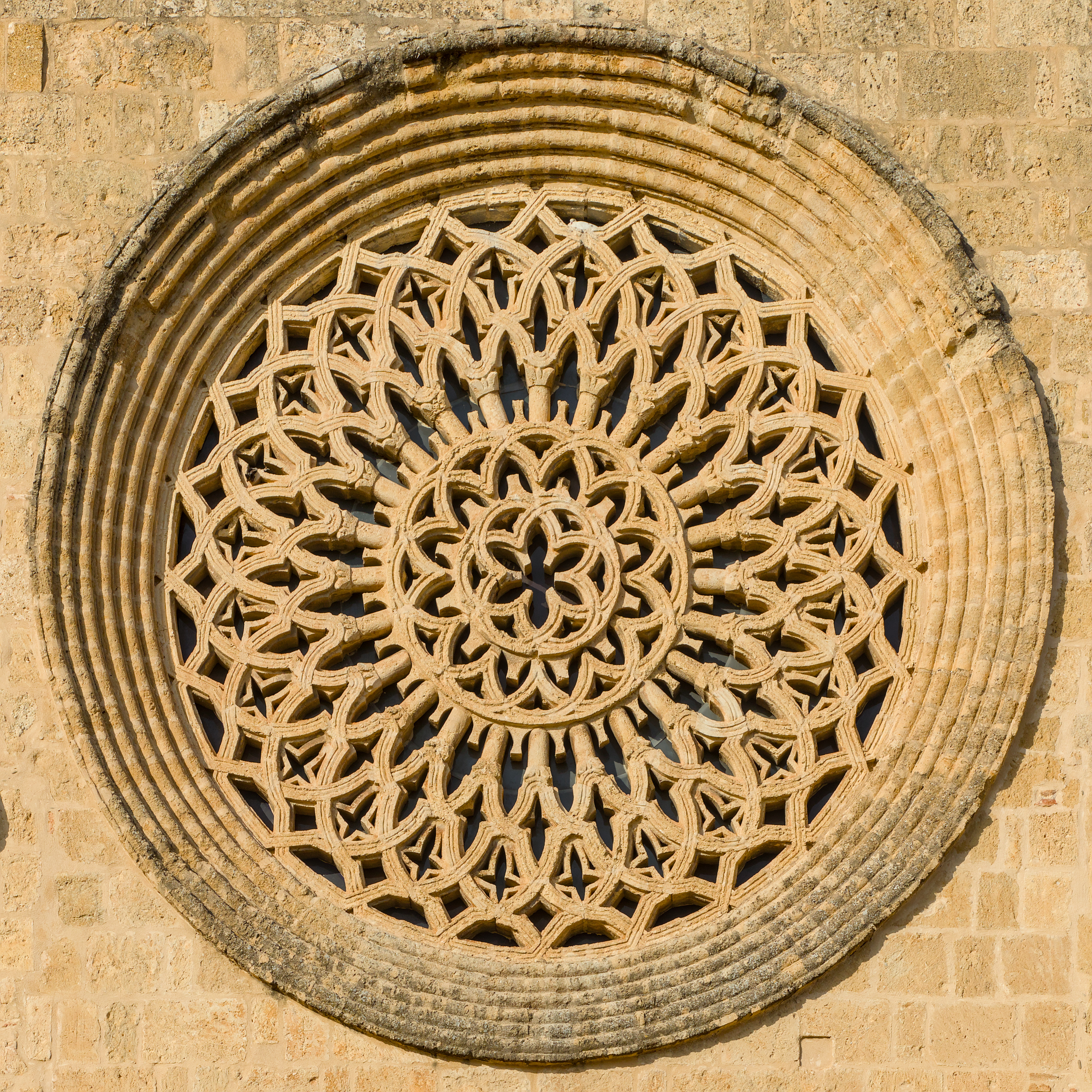
The Gothic-Mudéjar rose window.

It has a portico with three slightly ogival arcades, added in the 16th century. The Islamic minaret was converted into a Renaissance bell tower by Hernán Ruiz the Younger. Above the portico is the large Gothic-Mudéjar rose window. The nave has a coffered ceiling in Mudéjar-Renaissance style. The apse has 14th century paintings inspired by the Italian Gothic school, depicting Scenes of the Life of Jesus. There are also figures of saints and prophets with gilt halos, and a decoration imitating Byzantine azulejos. the high altar (17th century) has scenes of the life of St. Lawrence.
