= Francisco Regalón =

Spanish footballer (born 1987)

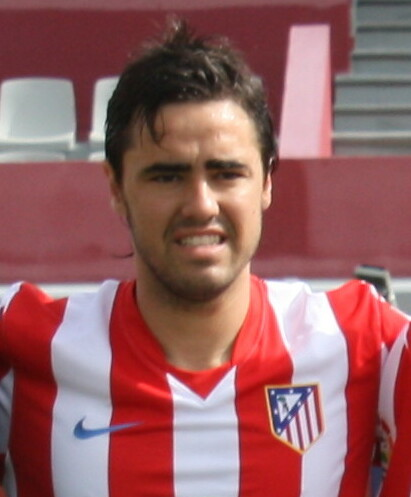
- Regalón with Atlético Madrid B, 2009

Personal information
- Full name: Francisco Regalón Cerezo
- Date of birth: 19 February 1987 (age 39)
- Place of birth: Algallarín, Spain
- Height: 1.82 m (6 ft 0 in)
- Position: Centre back

Youth career
- Atlético Madrid

Senior career*
Years	Team	Apps	(Gls)
2005–2006	Atlético Madrid C		
2006–2012	Atlético Madrid B	116	(14)
2012–2017	Numancia	124	(12)
2017	Cultural Leonesa	9	(1)
2017–2018	Racing Santander	23	(2)
2018–2021	Castellón	28	(2)

International career
2002–2003	Spain U16	8	(0)
2004	Spain U17	1	(0)
- * Club domestic league appearances and goals as of 26 July 2020

Francisco Regalón Cerezo (born 19 February 1987) is a Spanish professional footballer who plays as a central defender.

== Club career ==
Born in Algallarín, Córdoba, Andalusia, Regalón finished his development with Atlético Madrid, spending six full seasons with the reserves in the Segunda División B and making his debut in the competition on 12 February 2006 in a 1–1 away draw against AD Alcorcón. In the 2011–12 campaign, he scored a career-best five goals in 35 matches.

Regalón left the Colchoneros to join CD Numancia in June 2012, signing a one-year contract. He made his Segunda División debut on 18 August, in a 2–0 home win against Sporting de Gijón. He netted his first goal for the Soria club on 25 November, helping to a 4–2 away victory over Real Madrid Castilla.

On 23 March 2017, Regalón cut ties with Numancia and signed for Cultural y Deportiva Leonesa just hours later. On 1 August, after achieving promotion to the second tier, he moved to Racing de Santander.

== Honours ==
Cultural Leonesa

- Segunda División B: 2016–17
