= Castle of Bujalance =

Castle in Andalucia, Spain

Coordinates: 37.8973°N 4.3834°W

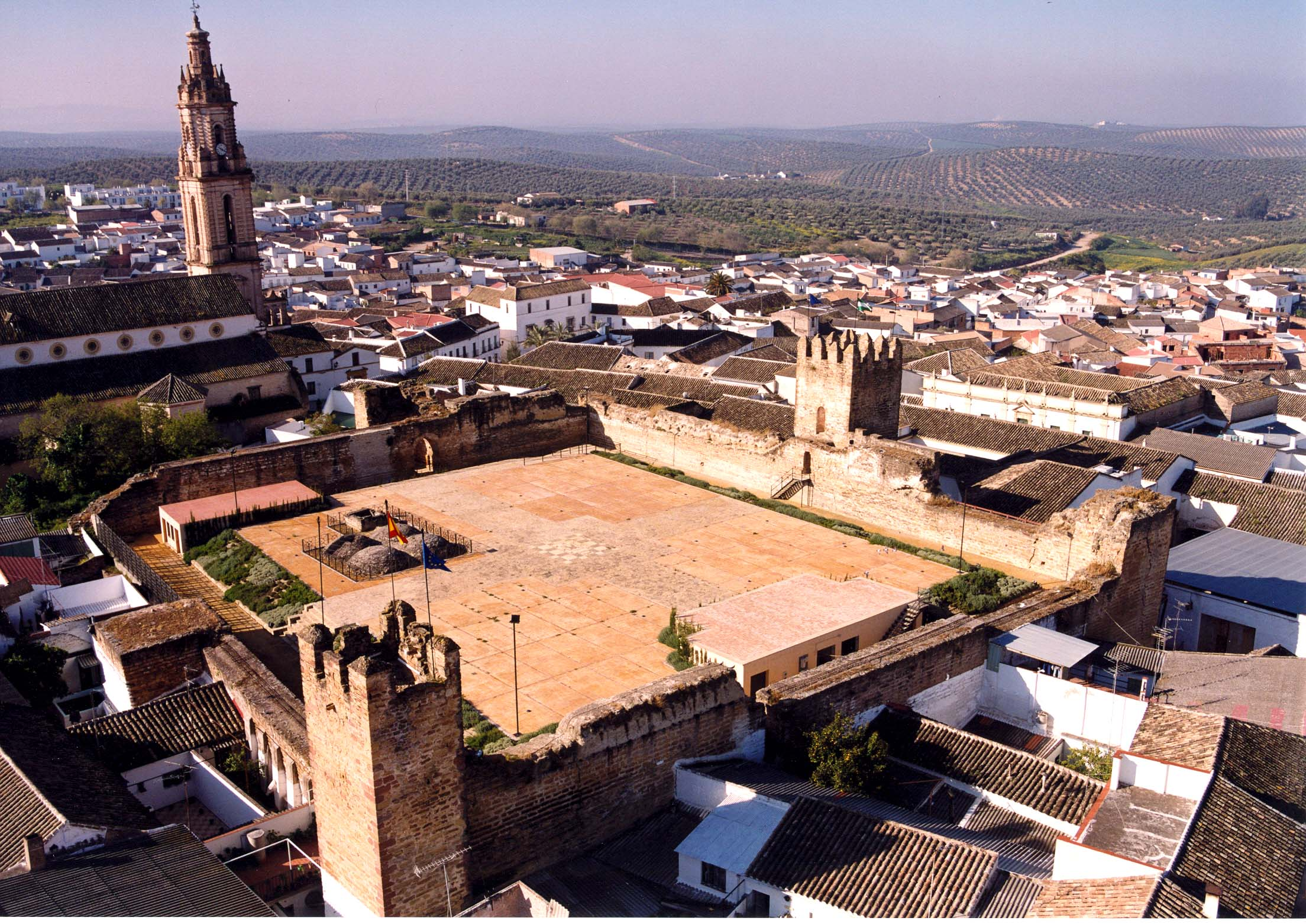
Castillo de Bujalance

Castillo de Bujalance (originally, Bury al-Hans ("tower of the snake") is a castle in the town of Bujalance, in Andalucia, southern Spain, in the province of Córdoba. It was built in the 10th century during the Caliphate of Abd-ar-Rahman III. It subsequently underwent several modernizations, most recently in 1512, which were paid for by Queen Joanna of Castile.

It is rectangular in shape, measuring 59 metres (194 ft) north-south and 51 metres (167 ft) east-west. The castle's original name, "tower of the snake", and the fact that it had seven towers, led to the current name of the city and its coat of arms. In 1963, the Ministry of Culture declared the site a Bien de Interés Cultural monument. Currently, its courtyard is used as a cultural space, which is in the process of being catalogued, restored and reconstructed. Highlights include the Festival of Theatre, Music and Dance (Nights at the Citadel) and Andalusian Dinner during the summer months.
