= Castle of Iznájar =

8th-century castle in Andalucia, Spain

Coordinates: 37.257778°N 4.308889°W

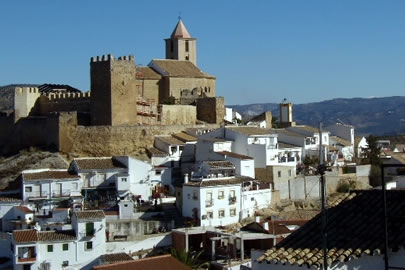
Castillo de Iznájar

Castillo de Iznájar is an 8th-century castle in Iznájar, Province of Córdoba in Andalucia, southern Spain. The castle is perched on the high ridge. It has a triangular design, truncated on the northeast side, with its longest side facing south, and a large central space. It is surrounded by a stretch of wall with flanking towers at the southeast and southwest corners. The east side is closed by a rectangular building, which is attached to the west with a pentagonal tower at the bow, and another tower in the east. Early access to the castle is believed to have been from the east side through a building attached to the primitive rectangular tower. It was declared a Bien de Interés Cultural monument on June 22, 1993.
