= Puerta del Puente =

Coordinates: 37.8778°N 4.7791°W

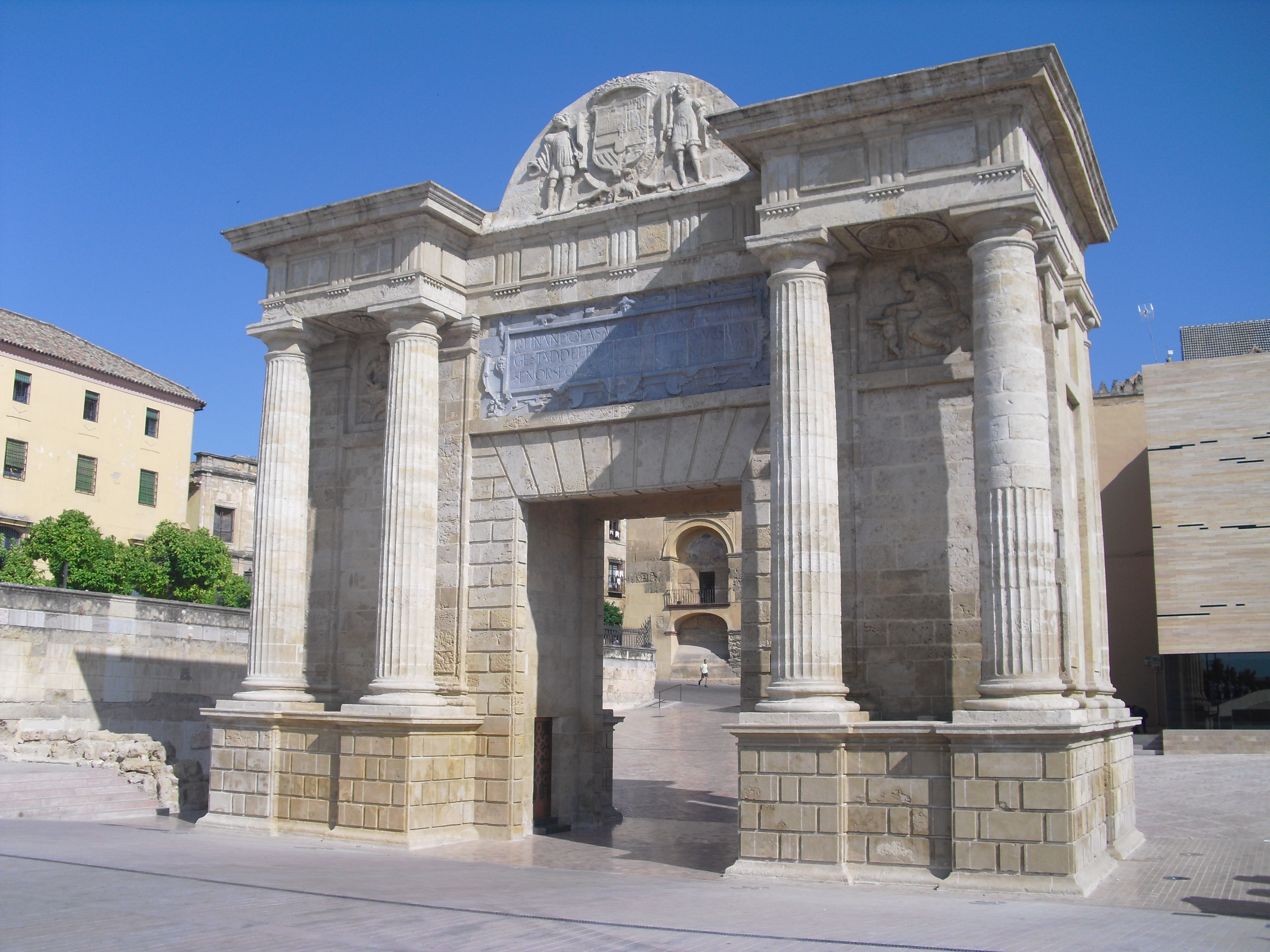

General information
- Location: Córdoba, Spain

UNESCO World Heritage Site
- Part of: Historic centre of Córdoba
- Criteria: Cultural: (i), (ii), (iii), (iv)
- Reference: 313bis
- Inscription: 1984 (8th Session)
- Extensions: 1994

Spanish Cultural Heritage
- Type: Non-movable
- Criteria: Monument
- Designated: 3 June 1931
- Part of: Puente sobre El Guadalquivir, su Puerta y la Calahorra
- Reference no.: RI-51-0000524

The Puerta del Puente (Spanish: "Gate of the Bridge") is a Renaissance gate in Córdoba, Andalusia. Built in the 16th century to commemorate a visit to the city by King Philip II, the gateway is located on the site of the previous Roman gates, linking the city with the Roman bridge and the Via Augusta.

Since 1931, the gate, together with the Roman bridge and the Calahorra tower, has been declared a Bien de Interés Cultural in the monument category. It also part of the historic centre of Cordoba, declared a World Heritage Site in 1984.

== History ==
In the sixteenth century, the authorities decided to improve the condition of the entrance to the city due to the deteriorated state of the existing gate. With this goal in mind, on February 18, 1572, mayor Alonso Gonzalez de Arteaga issued the order to build the Bridge Gate.

Reasons given focused on the fact that it was one of the city's main gates, handling a high volume of movement in terms of both people and supplies. In addition to enlarging the gateway, the city's officials wished to improve the artistic merits of the gate as part of an urban renewal.

Bridge Gate construction was started by Francisco de Montalbán although few months later, in 1571, Hernán Ruiz III which took over the works. Complications arose with respect to the design of the door, leading to a spike in the expected cost: the initial budget of 1400 ducats tripled to 3100. Work apparently stopped for a four-year period until 1576, when Hernán Ruiz resumed his work. Possibly due to the indebtedness of the City Council of Cordoba and general lack of funds, the project remained was unfinished.

In 1912, under the reign of Alfonso XIII, the area in which the Puerta del Puente was located was stripped of its walls and rebuilt in 1928 as a memorial gate, repeating on the inner side forms the outer side. In the late fifties the level of all the land bordering the door, until the original ground level was restored, when neighbouring buildings were lowered.

In the early twenty-first century, the first restoration of the Puerta del Puente took place, at which point archaeological excavations took place. Further restorative work continued in 2005.

== Sources ==
- Guía artística de la provincia de Córdoba. El Grupo Arca. 1995.
