= Cañete de las Torres =

- Municipality
- Flag Seal

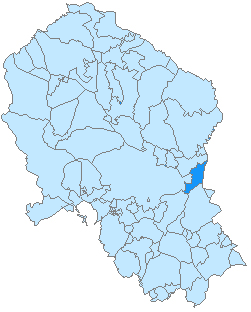
- Coordinates: 37°52′N 4°19′W
- Country: Spain
- Province: Córdoba
- Municipality: Cañete de las Torres

Area
  - Total: 103.52 km^{2} (39.97 sq mi)
- Elevation: 320 m (1,050 ft)

Population (2025-01-01)
  - Total: 2,766
  - Density: 26.72/km^{2} (69.20/sq mi)
- Time zone: UTC+1 (CET)
  - Summer (DST): UTC+2 (CEST)

Cañete de las Torres is a municipality located in the province of Córdoba, Spain. According to the 2006 census (INE), the city had a population of 3,211 inhabitants.

== See also ==
- List of municipalities in Córdoba
