= Plaza del Potro =

Public square in Córdoba, Spain

Coordinates: 37.8810°N 4.7748°W

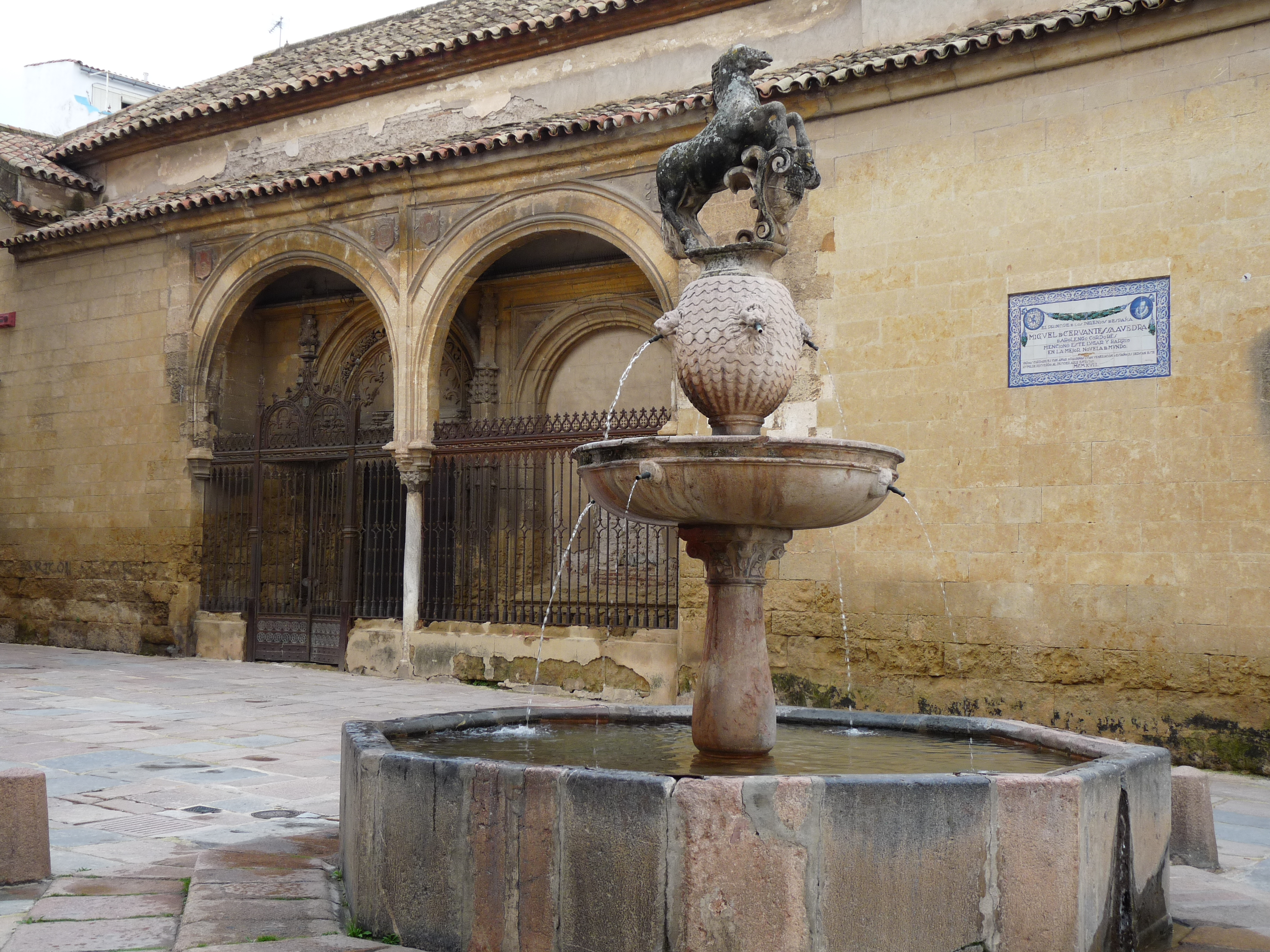
Fuenta del Potro and inscription celebrating Cervantes and the reference in Don Quioxte, "the best novel in the world".

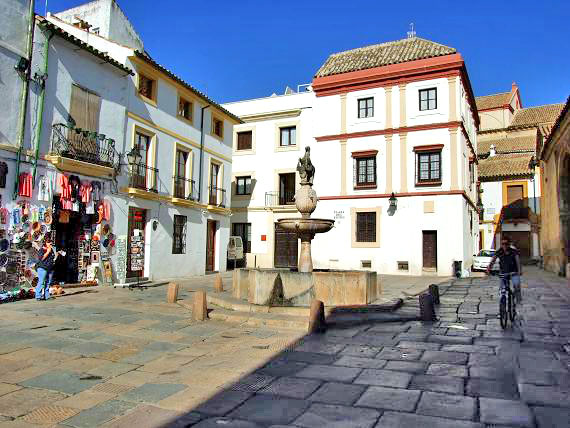
Plaza del Potro, with the Fuente del Potro at one end.

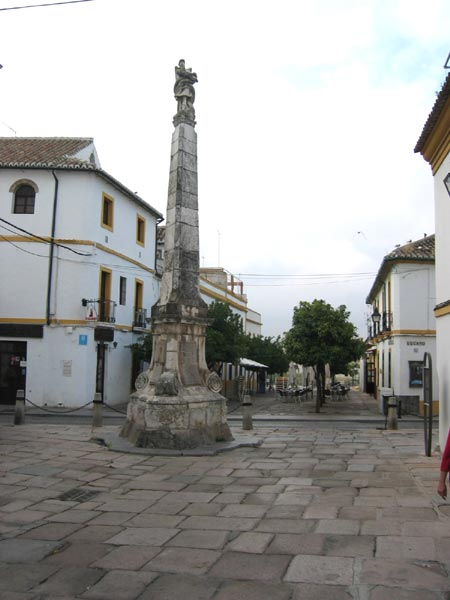
Monument to the archangel Raphael.

The Plaza del Potro is a public square in the Spanish city of Córdoba.

Rectangular in shape, one end of the plaza has a fountain topped by the figure of a colt with its front legs raised holding a sign with the coat of arms of the city. This Renaissance-style fountain dates from 1577, and the colt which gives its name to the square was added a century later. Until 1847 was located on the opposite side of the plaza.

Since 1924, the other end of the square has a monument dedicated to the Triumph of the archangel Raphael.

Among the buildings overlooking the square is the famous Posada del Potro, mentioned by Cervantes in Don Quixote, in addition to the city's Museum of Fine Arts and the Museum Julio Romero de Torres.

The reference in "Don Quixote" can be found in the Penguin Classics edition, translated by John D. Rutherford, in Chapter III as " ... Potro in Cordova ...", and in the Barnes & Noble edition, translated by Tobias Smollett, in Chapter III as " ... the spout of Cordoba ...". The much celebrated reference to the place and neighbourhood is made by an inn keeper making fun of Don Quixote with sarcastic chivalrous references to infamous brothels, disreputable districts and dens of iniquity.

== See also ==
- Posada del Potro
