= Calahorra Tower =

Fortified gate in Córdoba, Spain

Coordinates: 37°52′32″N 4°46′36″W

- Torre de la Calahorra
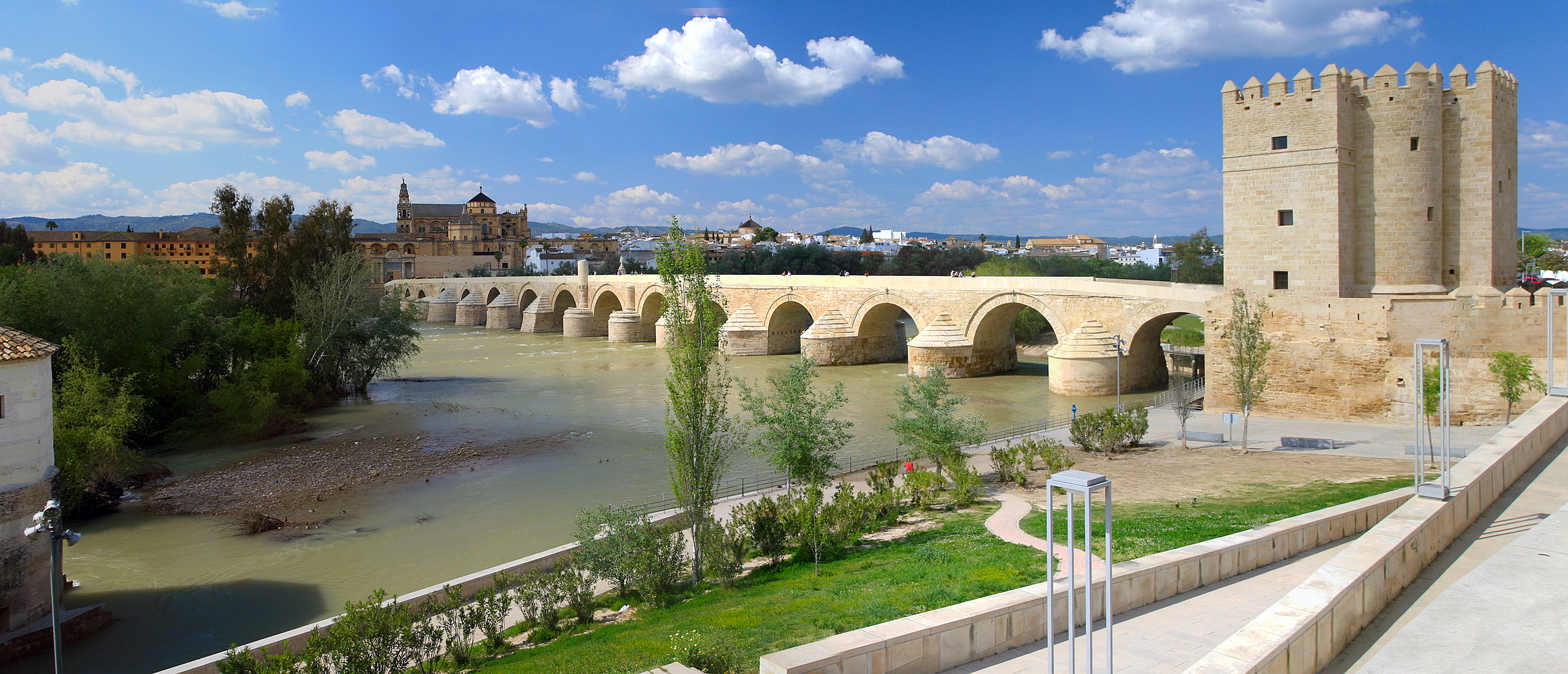
- Calahorra Tower to one side of the Roman Bridge.
- Interactive map of the Calahorra Tower area

General information
- Location: Córdoba, Spain

UNESCO World Heritage Site
- Part of: Historic centre of Córdoba
- Criteria: Cultural: (i), (ii), (iii), (iv)
- Reference: 313bis
- Inscription: 1984 (8th Session)
- Extensions: 1994

Spanish Cultural Heritage
- Type: Non-movable
- Criteria: Monument
- Designated: 3 June 1931
- Part of: Puente sobre El Guadalquivir, su Puerta y la Calahorra
- Reference no.: RI-51-0000524

The Calahorra tower (Spanish: Torre de la Calahorra) is a fortified gate in the historic centre of Córdoba, Spain. The edifice is of Islamic origin.

== History ==
It was first erected by Abu'l-Hasan the Almohad Caliphate in 1333 to protect the nearby Roman Bridge on the Guadalquivir. The tower, standing on the left bank of the river, originally consisted of an arched gate between two. A third tower was added to the existing ones, in the shape of two cylinders connecting them.

The tower was declared a national historical monument in 1931.

The restoration of the tower, along with the Roman Bridge, Gate of the Bridge and surrounding area, was awarded the European Union Prize for Cultural Heritage / Europa Nostra Award in 2014.

== See also ==
- Torre de la Malmuerta
