= San Miguel, Córdoba =

Coordinates: 37°53′09″N 4°46′46″W

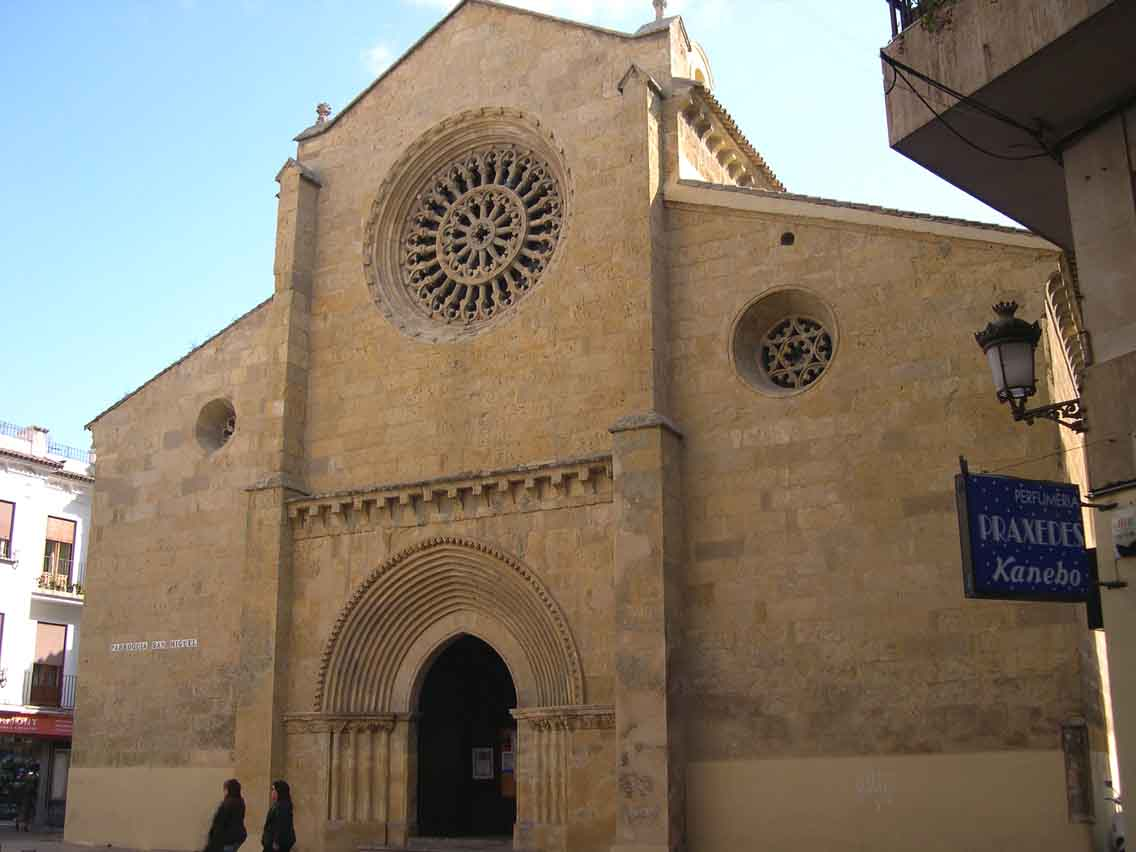
Church of San Miguel.

San Miguel is a Roman Catholic church in Córdoba, Andalusia, southern Spain. It is one of the twelve churches built by order of King Ferdinand III of Castile in the city after its conquest in the early 13th century. It was declared a monument of national interest in 1931.

It is an example of transition from the Romanesque to Gothic architecture, although the interior was largely renewed in 1749. It has a nearly square plan, with a nave and two aisles without a transept, a with polygonal apses; the nave has a coffered ceiling.

The main altar, in marble, was built in the 18th century. A side entrance has a horseshoe arch, perhaps dating to the Caliphate age.
