= Roman bridge of Córdoba =

Bridge in Córdoba, Spain was built in 1st century AD

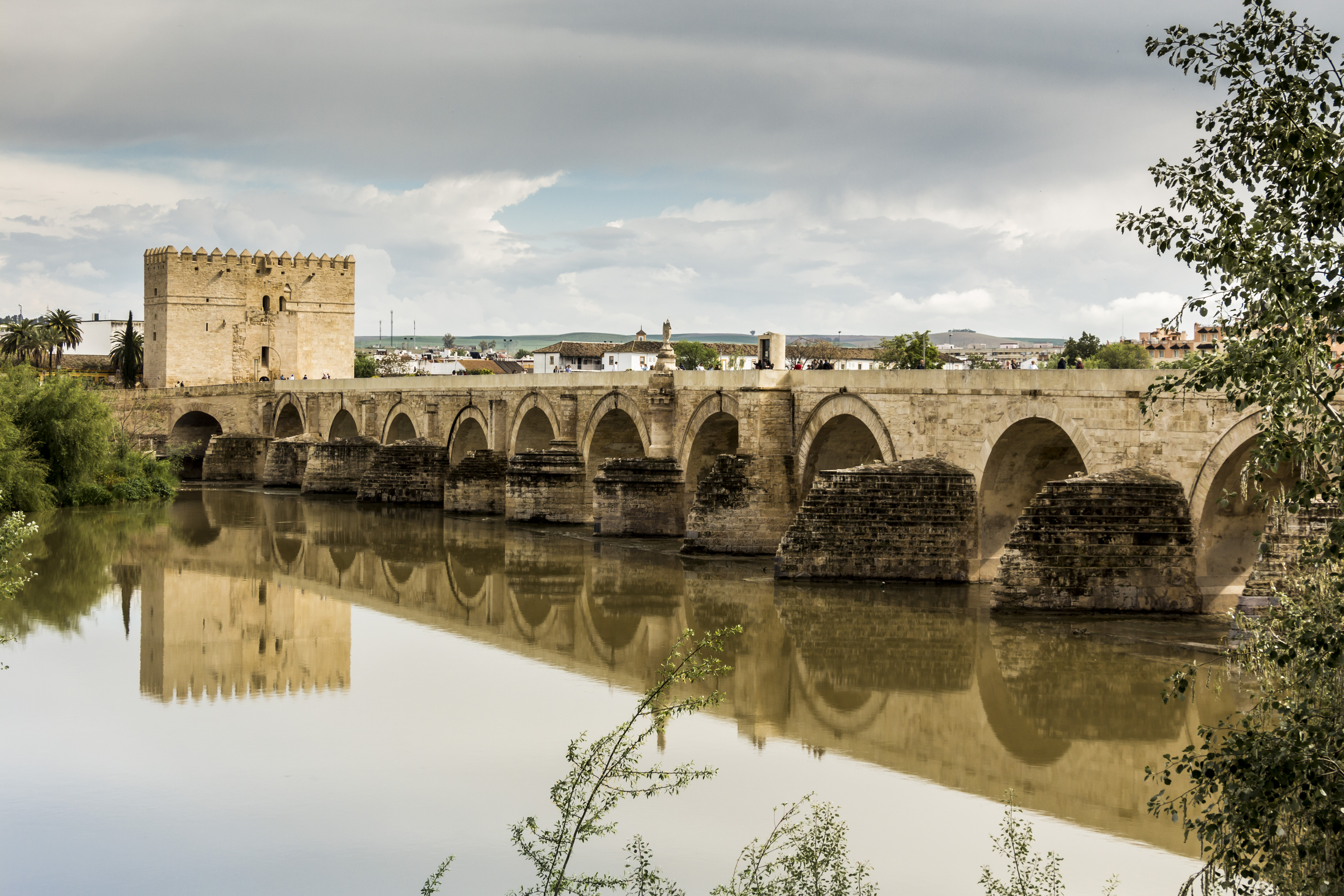
- Coordinates: 37°52′36″N 04°46′41″W
- Carries: Pedestrians and bicycles (since 2004)
- Crosses: Guadalquivir
- Locale: Córdoba, Spain
- Next upstream: Miraflores Bridge
- Next downstream: San Rafael Bridge

Characteristics
- Design: Arch bridge
- Total length: 331 m (1,086 ft)
- Width: 9 m (30 ft)
- Interactive map of Roman bridge of Córdoba

UNESCO World Heritage Site
- Part of: Historic centre of Córdoba
- Criteria: Cultural: (i), (ii), (iii), (iv)
- Reference: 313bis
- Inscription: 1984 (8th Session)
- Extensions: 1994

Spanish Cultural Heritage
- Type: Non-movable
- Criteria: Monument
- Designated: 3 June 1931
- Part of: Puente sobre El Guadalquivir, su Puerta y la Calahorra
- Reference no.: RI-51-0000524

Location
- Interactive map of Roman bridge of Córdoba

The Roman bridge of Córdoba is in the Historic centre of Córdoba, Andalusia, southern Spain

It was originally built in the early 1st century across the Guadalquivir river and has been reconstructed at various times.

It is known locally as the "Old Bridge" because for two thousand years it was the city's only bridge across the river, until the construction of the San Rafael Bridge in the mid-twentieth century.

Most of the present structure dates from reconstruction by the Arabs in the 8th century. It is part of the historic centre of Cordoba.

It is included in the preserved area known as Sotos de la Albolafia. Since 1931, the bridge, together with the Puerta del Puente and the Calahorra tower, has been declared a Bien de Interés Cultural in the monument category.

It was declared a World Heritage Site in 1984.

== History ==
The bridge was built by the Romans in the early 1st century BC, perhaps replacing a previous wooden one. After the Islamic reconstruction its shape had 16 arcades, one fewer than originally, and a total length of 247 meters. The width is around 9 meters.

The Via Augusta, which connected Rome to Cádiz, most likely passed through it. During the early Islamic domination the Umayyad dynasty's designated Muslim governor Al-Samh ibn Malik al-Khawlani ordered a bridge to be built on the ruins of what was left of the old Roman construction. In the Middle Ages, the Calahorra Tower and the Puerta del Puente were built at the bridge's southern and northern ends, respectively (the latter is now a 16th-century reconstruction). The bridge was reconstructed and expanded to its current size. The arches depict the Islamic architecture that dominated the city's scenery. In the 17th century, a sculpture depicting St. Raphael was put in the middle of the bridge, executed by Bernabé Gómez del Río.

During its history, the bridge was restored and renovated several times (in particular in the 10th century), and now only the 14th and 15th arches (counting from the Puerta del Puente) are original.

=== Pedestrianisation ===
On 1 May 2004, the bridge was pedestrianised after the construction of Miraflores bridge (completed in 2003).

=== Restoration ===
In 2006, it was closed to traffic to carry out conservation work on the structure, as well as internal and external restoration work. The restoration of the bridge had a budget of 13.6 million euros and was completed on 1 January 2008. The work was directed by municipal architect Juan Cuenca Montilla. The restoration was controversial as it significantly affected the appearance of the bridge, such as the pink granite used for the paving. As part of the work, the starlings were cleaned, uncovering the original brickwork, the paving was replaced with polished granite slabs, the nineteenth century street lights were replaced with bollard lights and the existing niche dedicated to Saint Acisclus and Saint Victoria was refurbished. In addition, the level of the north end of the bridge was raised, making it flush with the Paseo de la Ribera. The inauguration of the restored bridge took place on 9 January 2008 and was attended by the president of the Regional Government of Andalusia Manuel Chaves and the mayor of Córdoba Rosa Aguilar.

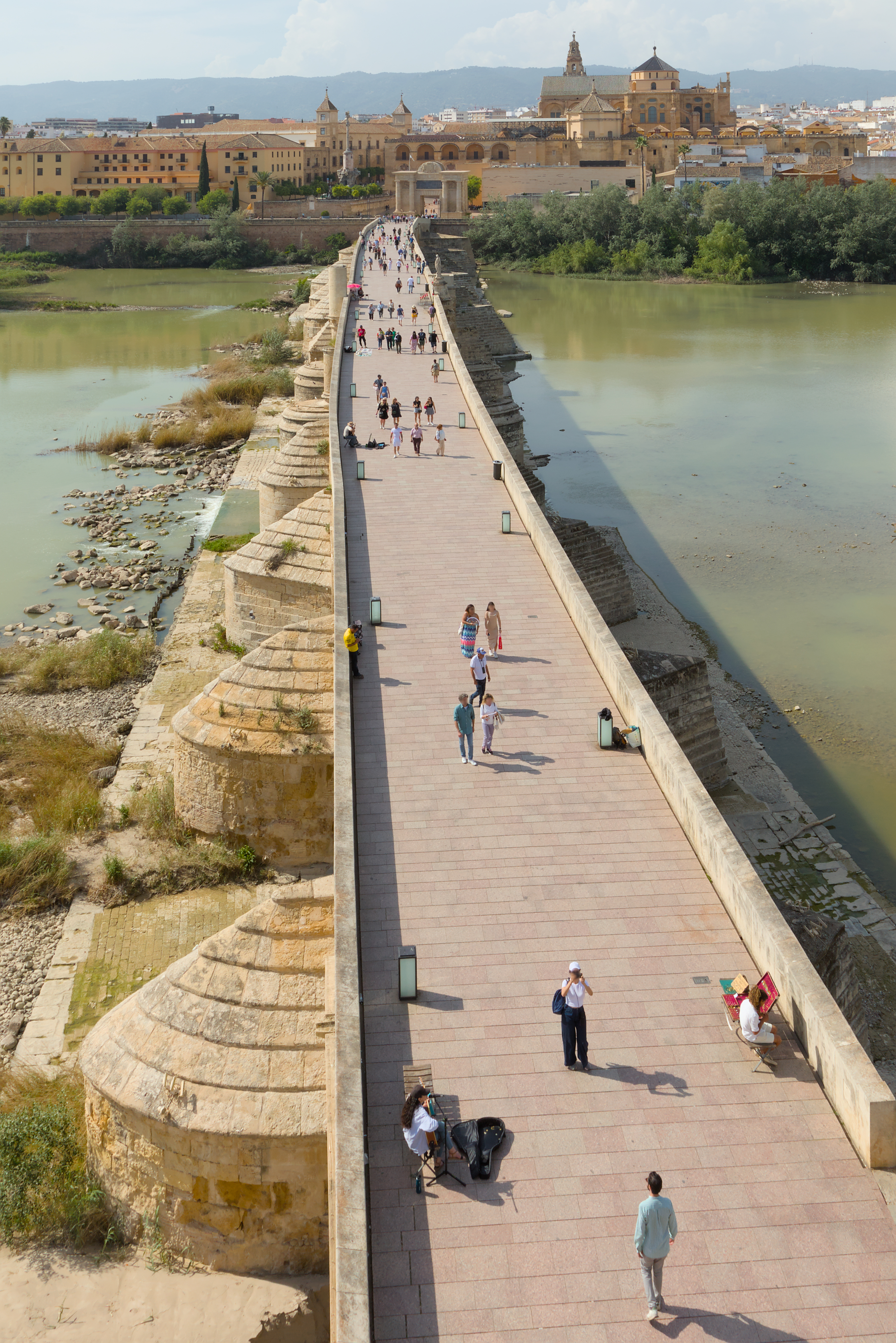
View from Calahorra Tower.
