= Bujalance =

- Municipality
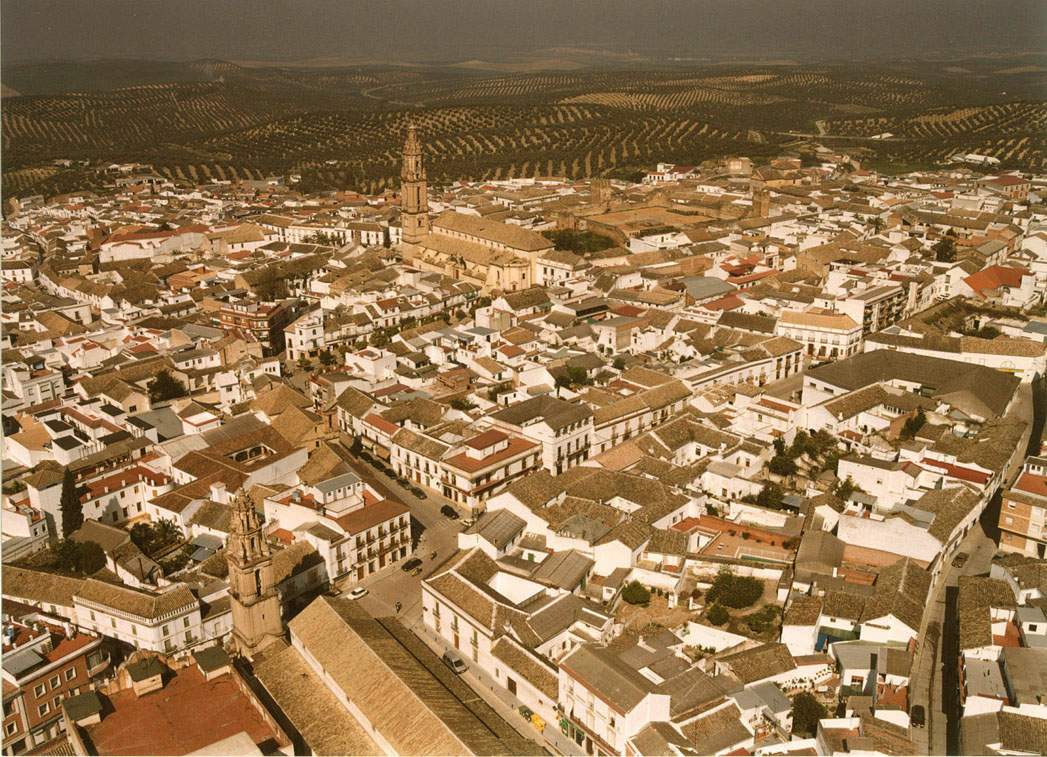
- Bujalance from the air

- Flag Coat of arms

- Location in Spain Bujalance (Andalusia) Bujalance (Spain)
- Coordinates: 37°54′N 4°23′W
- Country: Spain
- Autonomous community: Andalusia
- Province: Córdoba
- Comarca: Alto Guadalquivir
- Judicial district: Córdoba
- Founded: Roman times or earlier

Government
  - Mayor: Francisco Mestanza León

Area
  - Total: 124.82 km^{2} (48.19 sq mi)
- Elevation: 357 m (1,171 ft)

Population (2025-01-01)
  - Total: 7,065
  - Density: 56.60/km^{2} (146.6/sq mi)
- Demonym(s): Bujalanceños, Bursabolitanos or Bursabolenses
- Time zone: UTC+1 (CET)
  - Summer (DST): UTC+2 (CEST)
- Postal code: 14650
- Website: Official website

Bujalance is a town located in the heart of Andalucia, southern Spain, in the province of Córdoba. As of 2010, it had 7910 inhabitants.

Its name is derived from the Arabic term Burj al-Hansh. Among its monuments and places of interest are the Moorish Castle of Bujalance (10th century), the church of Nuestra Señora de la Asunción), and hermitages and olive groves.

== See also ==
- List of municipalities in Córdoba
