= San Nicolás de la Villa =

Church in Cordoba (Spain)

Coordinates: 37°53′04″N 4°46′56″W

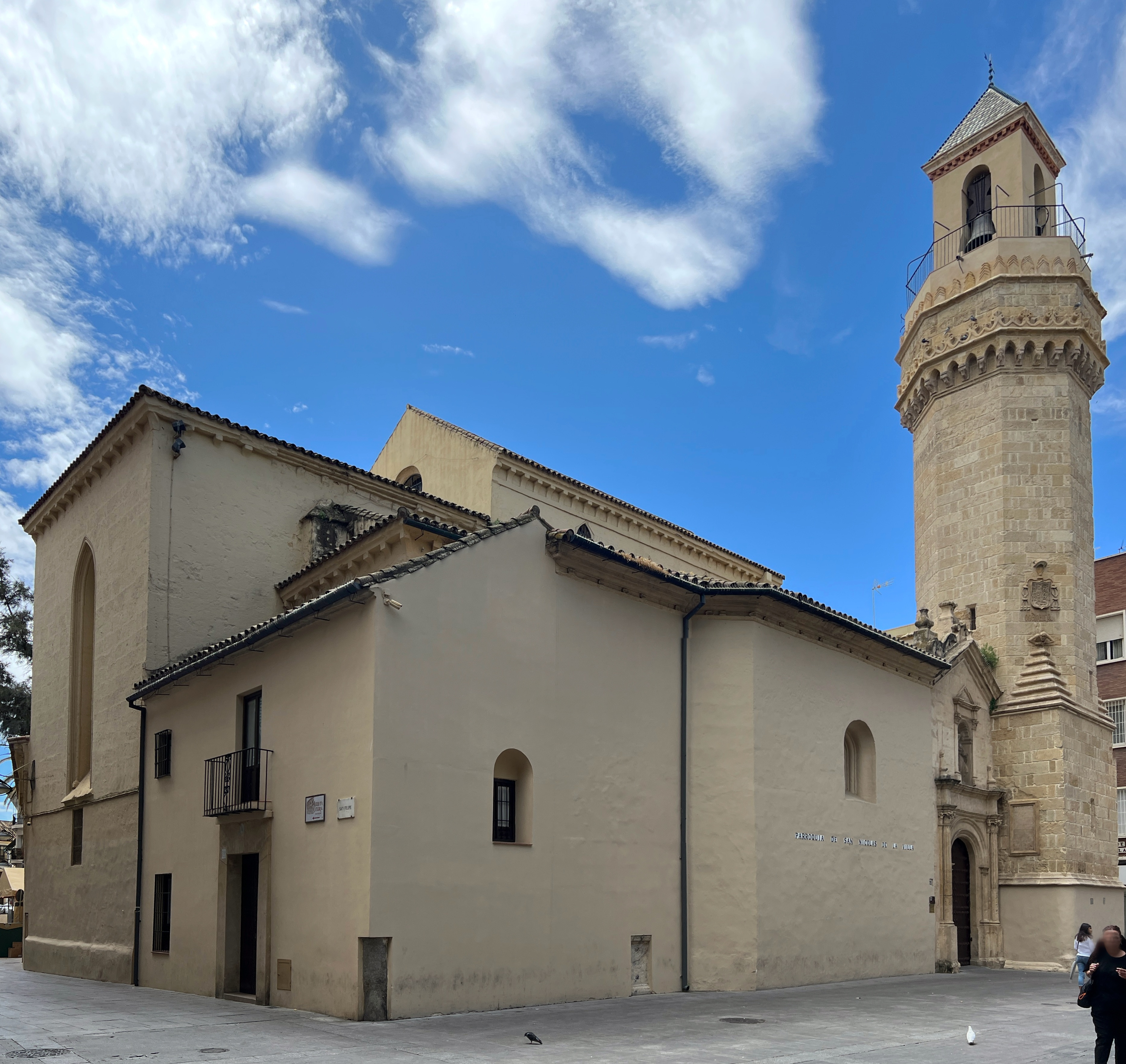
San Nicolás de la Villa

San Nicolás de la Villa is a church in Córdoba, Andalusia, southern Spain.

It is one of the twelve Fernandine churches built in the city after its conquest by King Ferdinand III of Castile (1236), in Gothic-Mudéjar style, although it was completed only in the following centuries, with much renovation added in the sometime. The main portal, in Renaissance style, was added by Hernán Ruiz the Younger in the 16th century. The octagonal tower, with a defensive appearance, was rebuilt during the age of the Catholic Monarchs above an older Islamic minaret.

In the 17th and 18th century, much of the church's elements were modified until it received the current mostly Baroque appearance. The baptistery dates from 1555.
