= Adamuz =

- Municipality
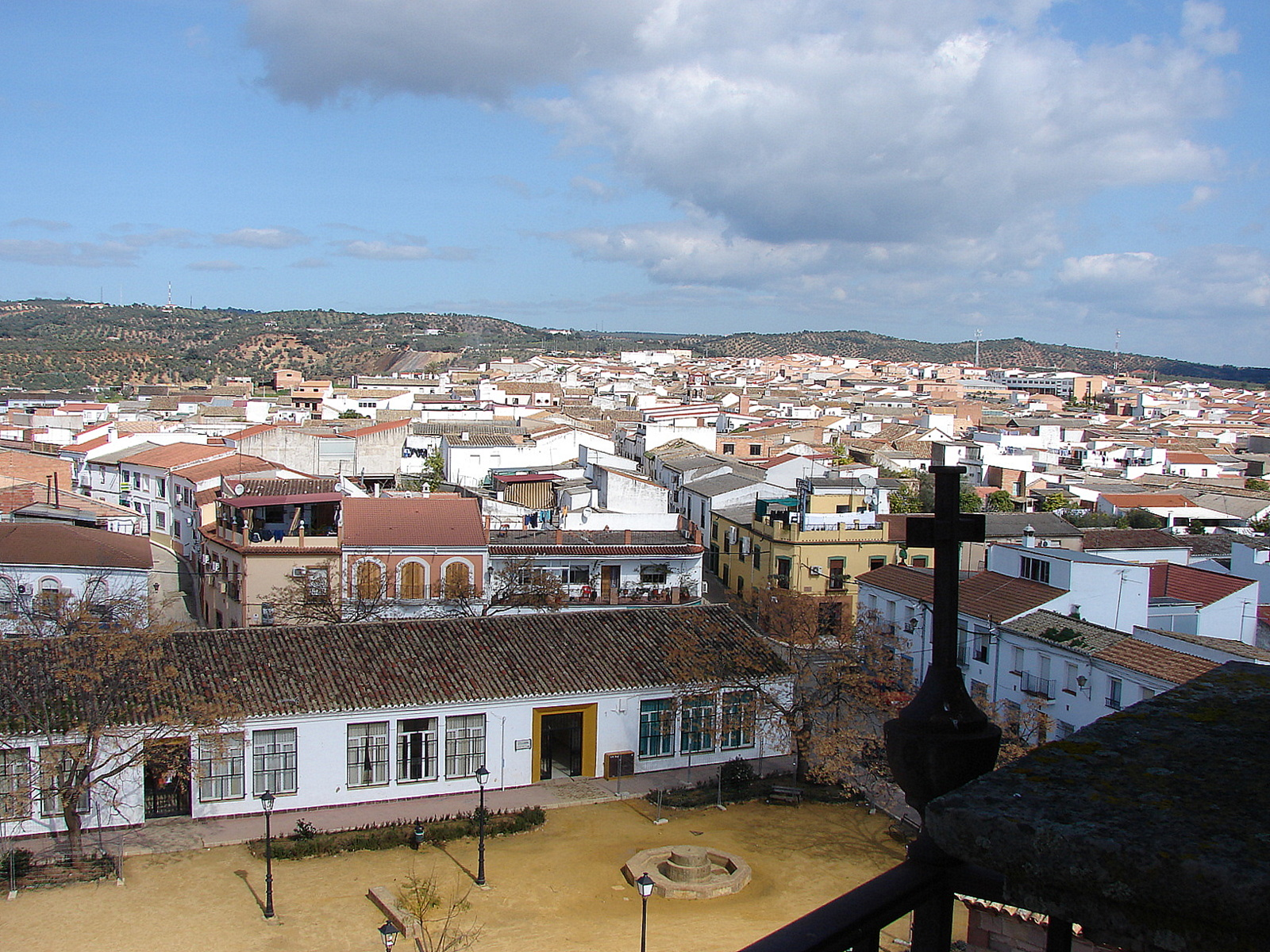

- Coat of arms
- Interactive map of Adamuz
- Location in Spain Adamuz (Spain)
- Coordinates: 38°1′41″N 4°31′22″W
- Country: Spain
- Autonomous community: Andalusia
- Province: Córdoba

Area
  - Total: 334 km^{2} (129 sq mi)
- Elevation: 240 m (790 ft)

Population (2025-01-01)
  - Total: 4,100
  - Density: 12/km^{2} (32/sq mi)
- Demonym: Adamuceños
- Time zone: UTC+1 (CET)
  - Summer (DST): UTC+2 (CEST)
- Website: www.adamuz.es

Adamuz is a city and a municipality of Spain in the province of Córdoba, Andalusia, about 37 kilometres (23 mi) by road northeast of Córdoba. The municipality includes the village of Algallarín. As of 2024 it had a population of around 4,091, in an area covering 334.7 square kilometres (129.2 sq mi).

== History ==
The name Adamuz is derived from the Arabic word Damus, meaning cave, corner or reservoir. Items unearthed at Cañaveralejo Cave from the early Copper Age indicate a Neolithic settlement in the area, and several Roman era headstones and a lead urn were discovered, in proximity to what was the Roman town of Sacilis Martialis.

The municipality was established in 1260. It was sold in 1566 by Philip II to the commander of Alcañiz, don Luis Méndez de Aro y Sotomayor, Marquis of El Carpio.

On 18 January 2026, two high-speed passenger trains derailed nearby, killing 46 people and injuring 292 others.

== Geography and climate ==
Adamuz is located at 242 metres (794 ft) above sea level in the province of Córdoba, Andalusia, about 37 kilometres (23 mi) by road northeast of Córdoba and 188 kilometres (117 mi) north of Málaga, between the Sierra Morena and the Guadalquivir River. The municipality, covering an area of 334.7 square kilometres (129.2 sq mi), includes the village of Algallarín. The vegetation in the vicinity is characteristic of Mediterranean forests. Adamuz has a typically Mediterranean climate with high sunshine and low rainfall, which is almost non-existent during the summer.

== Main sights ==
- The Communal Forest is an estate of 2,500 hectares, owned by the city and flanked by two rivers, which retain their winter waters through small dams. It is crossed from north to south along the road between the Valley Adamuz of Pedroches.
- Clock Tower, built in 1566 by Luis Méndez de Haro, Marques del Carpio. It has a height of 15 meters.
- Chapel of St. Pius V
- Parish Church of St. Andrew the Apostle (13th century). It has a nave and two aisles without a transept. It houses a polychrome altar in gold leaf. The high square bell tower has internal spiral stairs. The church was renovated in the 16th century by Hernán Ruiz the Elder.

== Notable people ==
- Gata Cattana – feminist, poet and rapper
- Salvador Muñoz Perez – politician
- Francisco Rojas Cortes – flamenco singer

== See also ==
- Andalusia
- List of municipalities in Córdoba
