= Villa del Río =

- Municipality
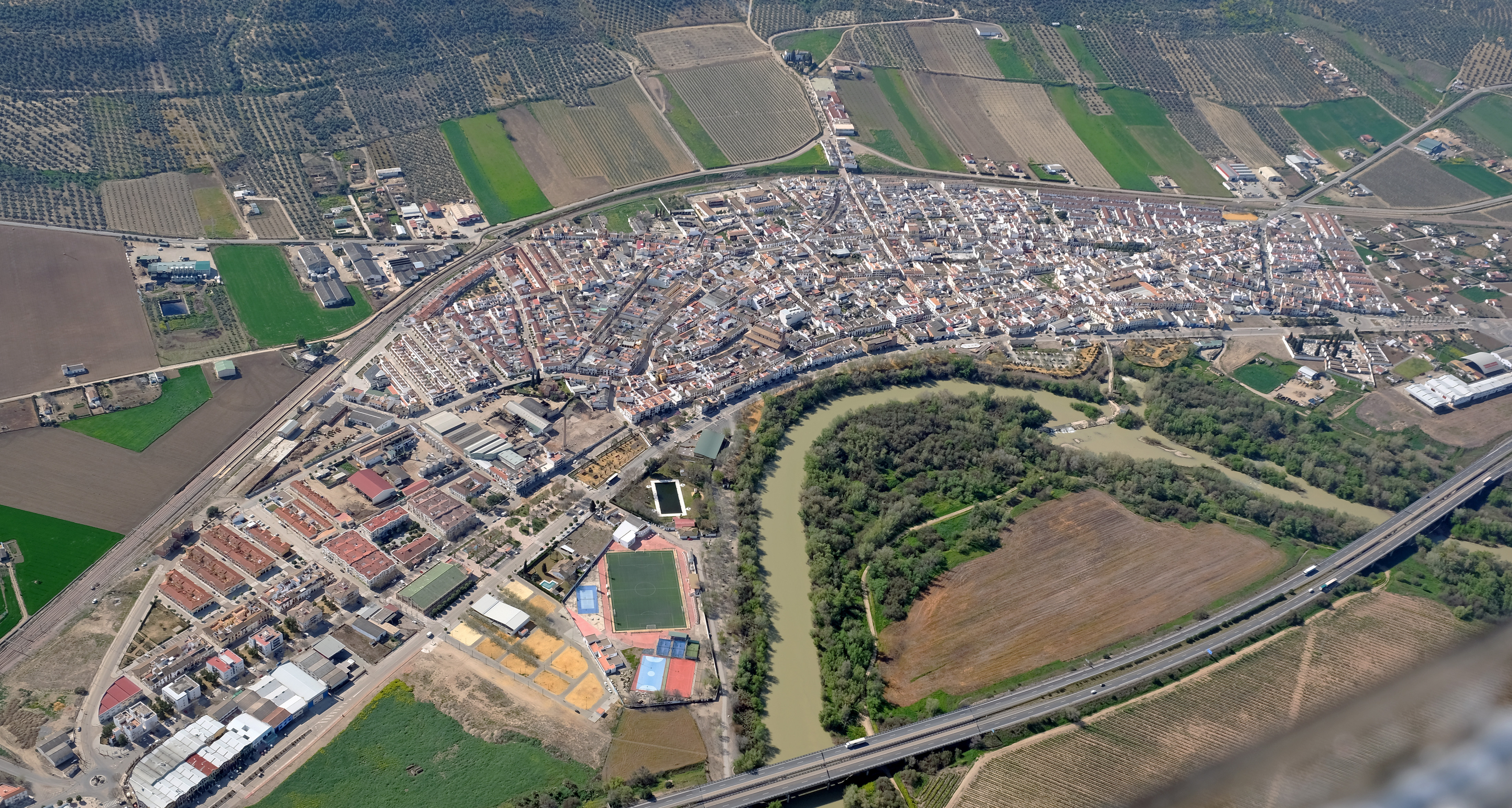

- Seal
- Interactive map of Villa del Río
- Coordinates: 37°59′N 4°17′W
- Country: Spain
- Province: Córdoba
- Municipality: Villa del Río

Area
  - Total: 22 km^{2} (8.5 sq mi)
- Elevation: 165 m (541 ft)

Population (2025-01-01)
  - Total: 6,852
  - Density: 310/km^{2} (810/sq mi)
- Time zone: UTC+1 (CET)
  - Summer (DST): UTC+2 (CEST)
- Website: www.villadelrio.es

Villa del Río is a municipality located in the province of Córdoba, Spain. According to the 2006 census (INE), the city has a population of 7433 inhabitants.

== See also ==
- List of municipalities in Córdoba
