= Castle of Belalcázar =

Coordinates: 38°34′58″N 5°09′56″W

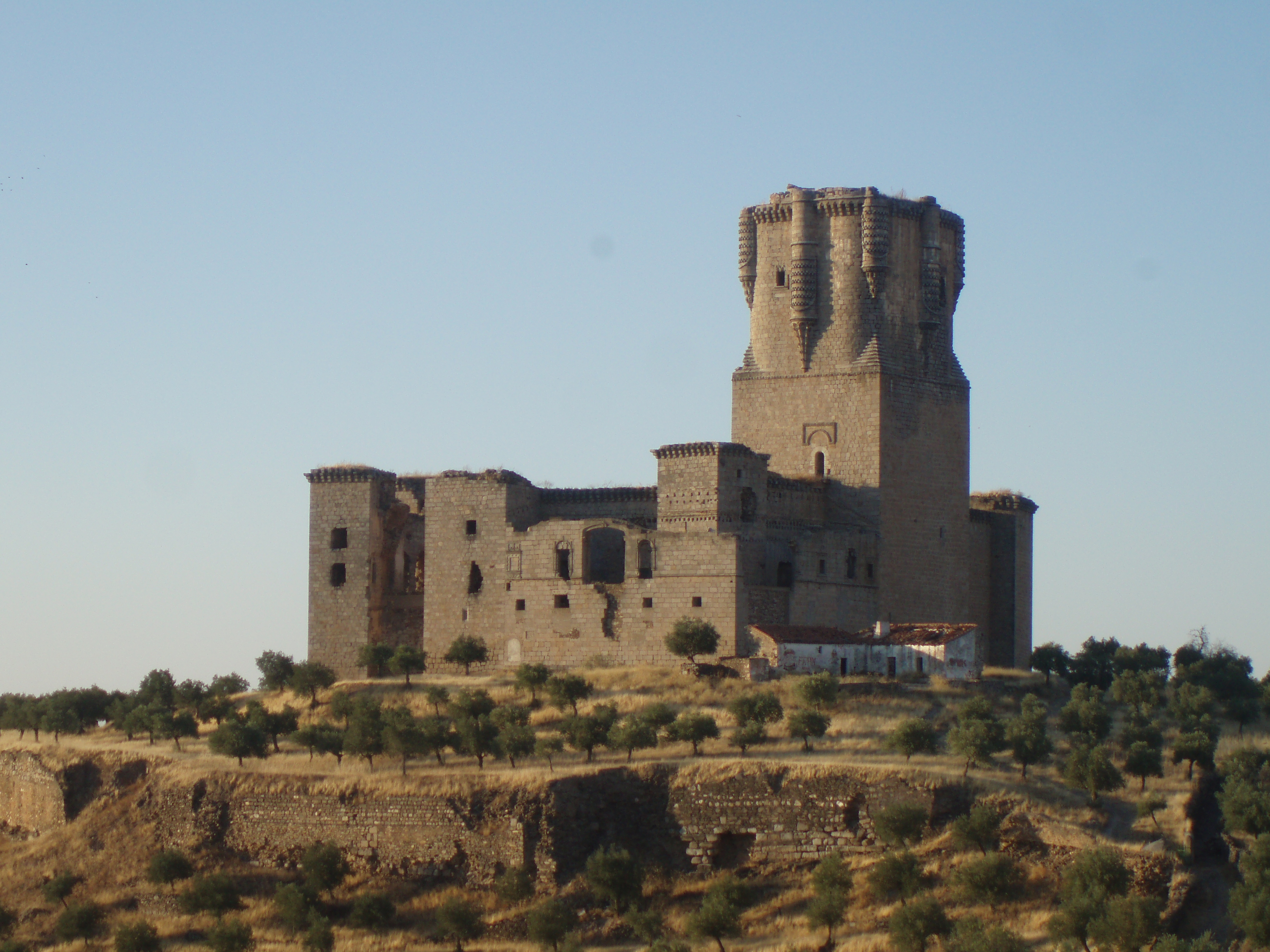
Castillo de Belalcázar

Castillo de Belalcázar (also, castillo de los Sotomayor Zúñiga y Madróñiz, or castillo de Gahete or castillo de Gafiq) is a Gothic castle in the city of Belalcázar, province of Córdoba, southern Spain. It was established in the second half of the 15th century.
