= Hernán Ruiz the Younger =

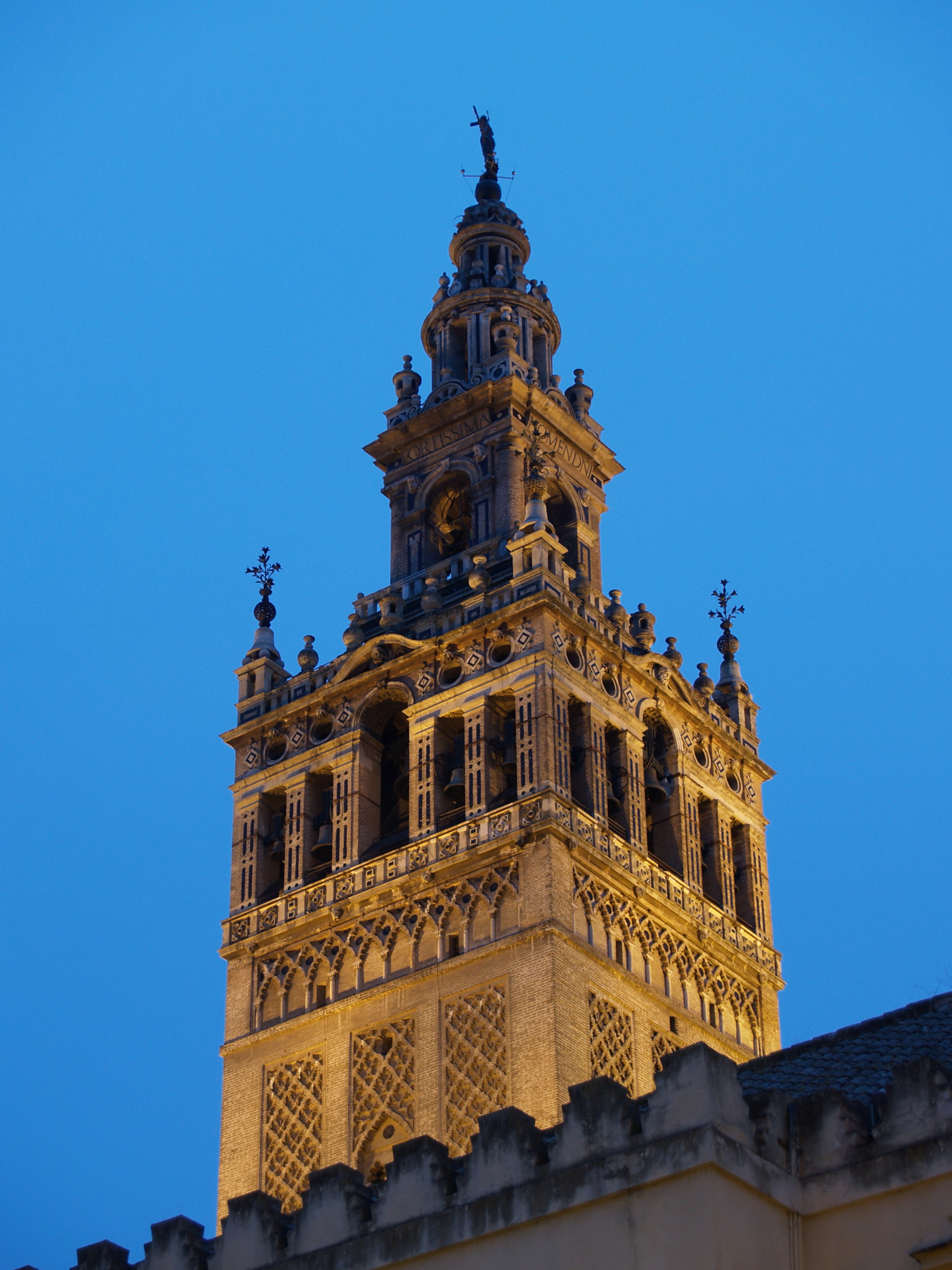
Giralda Top section of the bell tower

Hernán Ruiz the Younger (sometimes spelled Hernán Ruiz II; c. 1514 – 21 April 1569) was a Spanish Renaissance architect, active mostly in Andalusia.

He was born in Córdoba or Burgos, the son of Hernán Ruiz the Elder, also an architect. His activities include the role of director of the construction of the Cathedral of Córdoba (from 1547) and of Seville (since 1557), the baptistery of San Nicolás de la Villa (1540–1554), the Casa consistorial de Sevilla, the Hospital de las Cinco Llagas ("Hospital of the Five Holy Wounds") and others, including the bell tower of La Giralda.

He died at Seville in 1569. His son Hernán was also an architect.

== Sources ==
- Arquitectura renacentista. Historia de la Arquitectura Española. Volume 3. Editorial Planeta. 1986.
