= Central District, Córdoba =

Administrative district in Córdoba, Spain

Coordinates: 37.887°N 4.774°W

The neighborhoods of the Central District

The Central District is one of the ten districts of Córdoba, Spain. it includes the central area of the city.

The Central District is delimited to the west by Av. Del Corregidor, Av. Conde de Vallellano, Av. República Argentina and Av. Mozárabes. To the north, it is by Av. Of the Freedom and Av. To the Nasir; to the east by Av. Of the Almogávares,

In the south of the roundabout of the same name, Ronda de Marrubial, Av. De Barcelona, Campo de San Antón and Campo Madre de Dios. To the south by Guadalquivir river in the corresponding section of Ronda de los Mártires, Paseo de la Ribera, Ronda de Isasa and Av. Del Alcázar.
