= La Victoria, Spain =

La Victoria
- Municipality
- Flag Coat of arms

- Location in Spain
- Coordinates: 37°40′52″N 4°51′09″W
- Country: Spain
- Autonomous community: Andalusia
- Province: Córdoba
- Comarca: Valle Medio del Guadalquivir

Government
  - Mayor: José Abad Pino

Area
  - Total: 20 km^{2} (7.7 sq mi)
- Elevation: 228 m (748 ft)

Population (2025-01-01)
  - Total: 2,320
  - Density: 120/km^{2} (300/sq mi)
- Demonym: Victoreños
- Time zone: UTC+1 (CET)
  - Summer (DST): UTC+2 (CEST)
- Postal code: 14140
- Website: Official website

La Victoria is a municipality in the province of Córdoba, Spain. In the year 2011 its population was 2,336. It has an area of 20 square kilometres (7.7 mi^{2}) and a population density of 120/km^{2}. It is situated at an altitude of 262 metres (860 ft) above sea level and is 29 kilometres (18 mi) from the capital of the province, Córdoba.

== Demography ==
Number of inhabitants in municipality every year from 2001 to 2011.

2001	2002	2003	2004	2005	2006	2007	2008	2009	2010	2011
1,762	1,748	1,749	1,809	1,822	1,882	1,981	2,132	2,197	2,178	2,336

== Art and monumental heritage ==
=== Patrimonio Histórico Andaluz (Historical Andalusian heritage) ===
La Victoria has many cultural buildings because of it there is declared historical Andalusian Heritage.

== Geography ==
La Victoria borders with: The Carlota, San Sebastian of the Archers and Cordova. And also this one divided in a sector: The First sector: Village Quintana.

Northwest: La Carlota y Guadalcázar	north: Córdoba	North-East: Córdoba
West: La Carlota	La Victoria	east: Fernán-Núñez
Southwest La Carlota	South: San Sebastián de los Ballesteros y La Guijarrosa	South-east: San Sebastián de los Ballesteros y La Rambla

== History ==
Most historians agree that the foundation of the town is linked to the establishment of the Minims of St. Francis of Paula in Córdoba, when General of the Order requested the Bishop of Cordoba, Juan Daza and Osorio, your competition and the council, to establish in this city a convent of the Pauline order. The convent itself was founded Cordoba February 18, 1510, and the founder of the Order of Minims was beatified on 7 July 1513, reaching holiness, becoming San Francisco de Paula, on May 1, 1519. In 1810, when Spain was during the War of Independence, La Victoria, for the most part a vast olive grove, it was then known as The Guijarrosa to be part of an old and large parts of the Rambla with the same name. Near the present town was what we now call "The Old Victoria", i.e., the "inheritance" with "houses, wine cellar, winery, battery and jars, vines and trees" and "everything that belongs" that the November 21, 1551 bought the tanner Hillón Alonso and his wife, Isabel Rodriguez, Fray Andrés de Santa Maria to donate shortly after the January 26, 1552, the Minimum or friars of San Francisco de Paula del Convento of Our Lady of Victory in Cordoba.In the above "inheritance" Least built a chapel, whose existence we have been well documented, at least with respect to the eighteenth century: here they were married many of the ancestors who, for the most part, lived in humble and isolated "homes of campocubiertas straw "or" branch ", as they are called in the land of the Marquis de la Ensenada held in mid of that century. Along the same farm was also a cemetery.The subsequent emancipation of Victoria regarding La Rambla was, ultimately, in the light of Article 310, "La Pepa", the Constitution was born in Cadiz on March 19, 1812 and was reactivated on 15 August 1836 by Queen Maria Cristina.

== See also ==
- List of municipalities in Córdoba
