= Valle del Guadiato =

Coordinates: 38°15′02″N 5°10′33″W

- Comarca
- Location in Andalusia.
- Country: Spain
- Autonomous community: Andalusia
- Province: Córdoba
- Municipalities: List: Belmez, Espiel, Fuente Obejuna, La Granjuela, Los Blázquez, Obejo, Peñarroya-Pueblonuevo, Valsequillo, Villaharta, Villanueva del Rey, Villaviciosa de Córdoba

Area
  - Total: 2,493 km^{2} (963 sq mi)

Population (2009)
  - Total: 31,907
  - Density: 12.80/km^{2} (33.15/sq mi)
- Demonym
- Time zone: UTC+1 (CET)
  - Summer (DST): UTC+2 (CEST)

Valle del Guadiato is an official comarca (county) in the province of Córdoba, Andalusia, southern Spain.

Located in the Sierra Morena region, it is named after the Guadiato River.
