= Subbética =

Subbetica
- Comarca
- Coordinates: 37°24′35″N 4°20′52″W
- Country: Spain
- Autonomous community: Andalusia
- Province: Córdoba

Area
  - Total: 1,597 km^{2} (617 sq mi)

Population (2009)
  - Total: 126,802
  - Density: 79.40/km^{2} (205.6/sq mi)

Subbética is a comarca in the province of Córdoba, Spain.

== Municipalities ==
It contains the following municipalities:

- Almedinilla
- Benamejí
- Cabra
- Carcabuey
- Doña Mencía
- Encinas Reales
- Fuente-Tójar
- Iznájar
- Lucena
- Luque
- Palenciana
- Priego de Córdoba
- Rute
- Zuheros
