= List of municipalities in Córdoba =

Map of Spain with the province of Córdoba highlighted

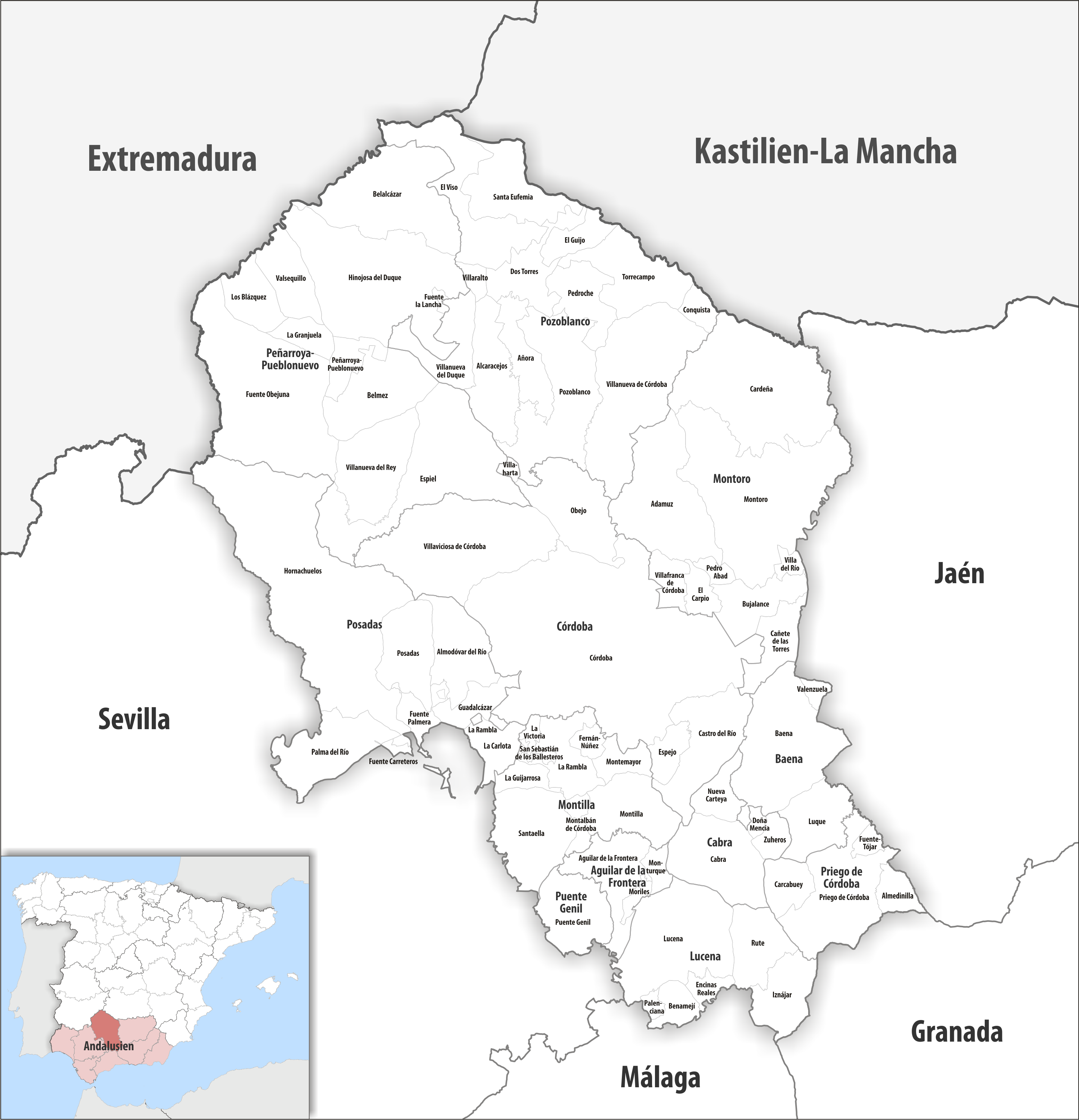
Map of the municipalities in the province of Córdoba

Córdoba is a province in the autonomous community of Andalusia, Spain. The province is divided into 77 municipalities. As of the 2024 Spanish census, Córdoba is the 20th most populous of Spain's 50 provinces, with 774,313 inhabitants, and the 13th largest by land area, spanning 13,771.97 square kilometres (5,317.39 sq mi). Municipalities are the most basic local political division in Spain and can only belong to one province. They enjoy a large degree of autonomy in their local administration, being in charge of tasks such as urban planning, water supply, lighting, roads, local police, and firefighting.

The organisation of municipalities in Spain is outlined by the local government law Ley 7/1985, de 2 de abril, Reguladora de las Bases del Régimen Local (transl. Law 7/1985, of 2 April, Regulating the Bases of the Local Administration), which was passed by the Cortes Generales—Spain’s national parliament—on 2 April 1985 and finalised by royal decree on 18 April 1986. Municipalities in Córdoba are also governed by the Statute of Autonomy of Andalusia, which includes provisions concerning their relations with Andalusia's autonomous government. All citizens of Spain are required to register in the municipality in which they reside. Each municipality is a corporation (Note: Within the context of local government in Spain, a corporation is a legal entity representing a municipality. Each municipality is empowered to govern over a specific piece of land and its population.) with independent legal personhood: its governing body is called the ayuntamiento (municipal council or corporation), a term often also used to refer to the municipal offices (city and town halls). The ayuntamiento is composed of the mayor (Spanish: alcalde), the deputy mayors (tenientes de alcalde) and the councillors (concejales), who form the plenary (pleno), the deliberative body. Municipalities are categorised by population for determining the number of councillors: three when the population is up to 100 inhabitants, five for 101–250, seven for 251–1,000, nine for 1,001–2,000, eleven for 2,001–5,000, thirteen for 5,001–10,000, seventeen for 10,001–20,000, twenty-one for 20,001–50,000, and twenty-five for 50,001–100,000. One councillor is added for every additional 100,000 inhabitants, with a further one included if the total would otherwise be even, to avoid tied votes.

The mayor and the deputy mayors are elected by the plenary assembly, which is itself elected by universal suffrage. Elections in municipalities with more than 250 inhabitants are carried out following a proportional representation system with closed lists, whilst those with a population lower than 250 use a block plurality voting system with open lists. The plenary assembly must meet periodically, with meetings occurring more or less frequently depending on the population of the municipality: monthly for those whose population is larger than 20,000, once every two months if it ranges between 5,001 and 20,000, and once every three months if it does not exceed 5,000. Many ayuntamientos also have a local governing board (Spanish: junta de gobierno local), which is appointed by the mayor from amongst the councillors and is required for municipalities of over 5,000 inhabitants. The board, whose role is to assist the mayor between meetings of the plenary assembly, may not include more than one third of the councillors.

The largest municipality by population in the province as of the 2024 Spanish census is Córdoba, its capital, with 324,902 residents, while the smallest is Valsequillo, with 321 residents. The largest municipality by area is also Córdoba, which spans 1,254.62 square kilometres (484.41 sq mi), while Fuente la Lancha is the smallest at 7.83 square kilometres (3.02 sq mi).

== Municipalities ==
Largest municipalities in the province of Córdoba by population

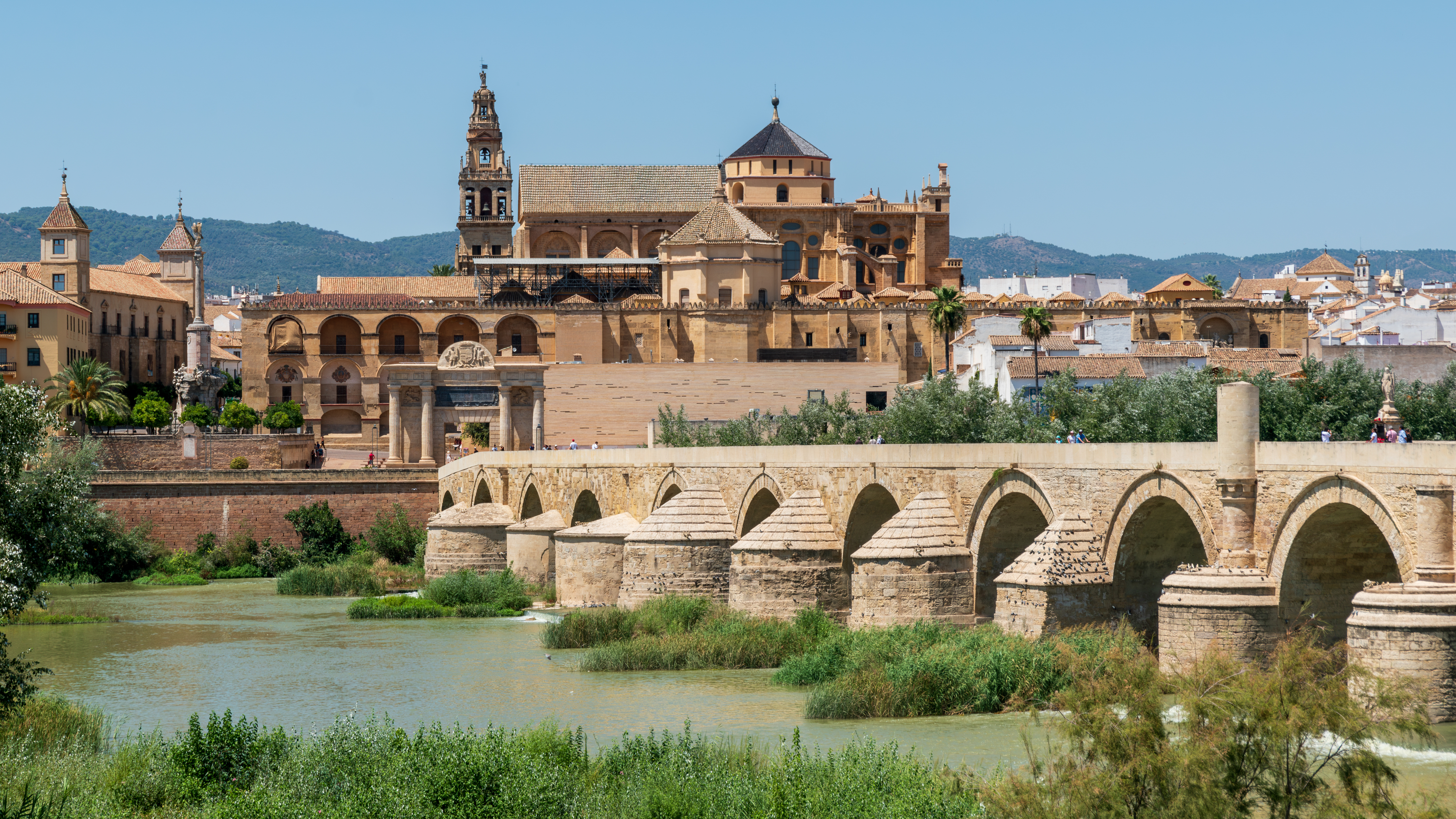
Córdoba is the province's capital and largest municipality by population.

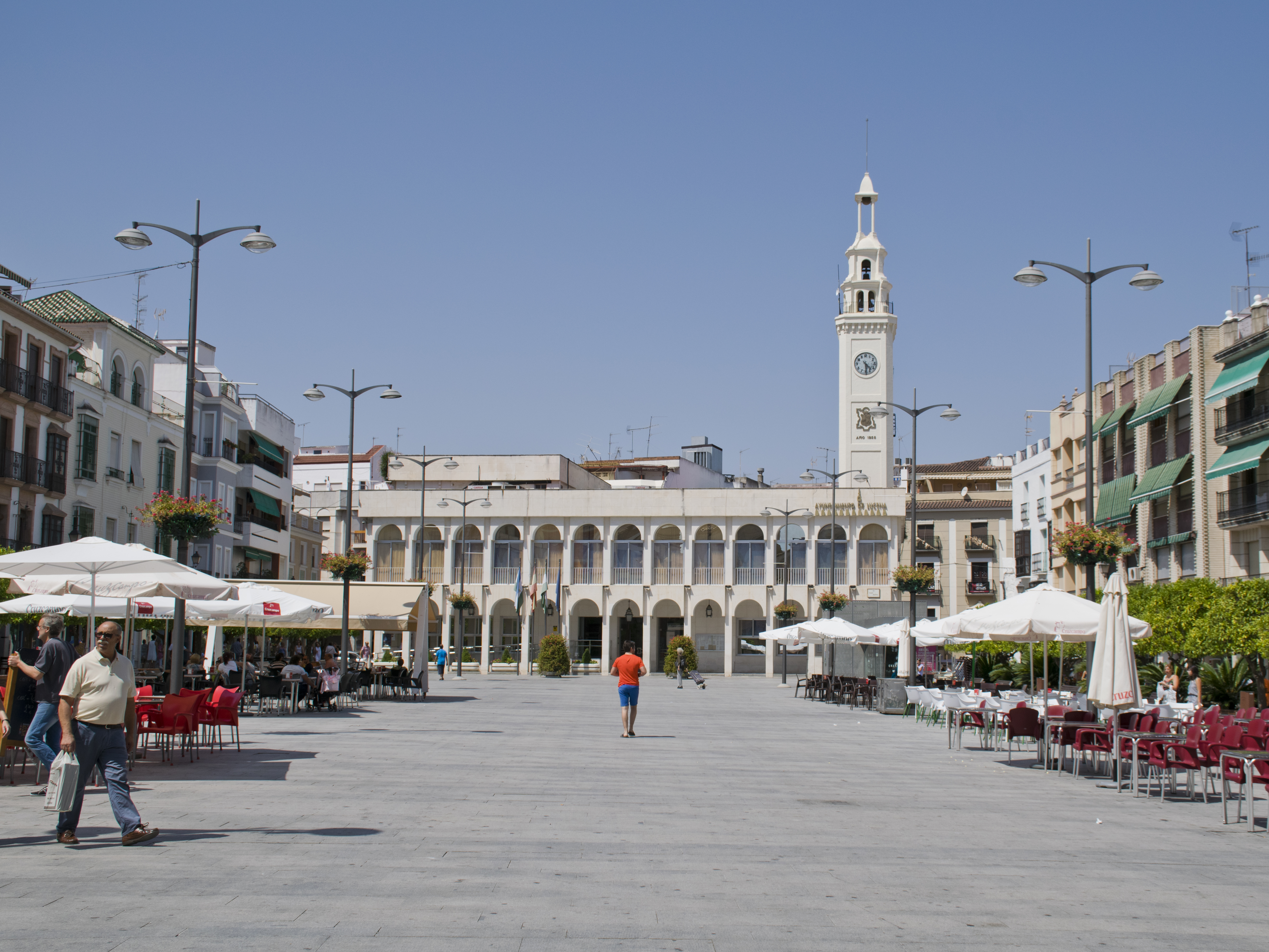
Lucena, the second largest municipality by population in the province of Córdoba

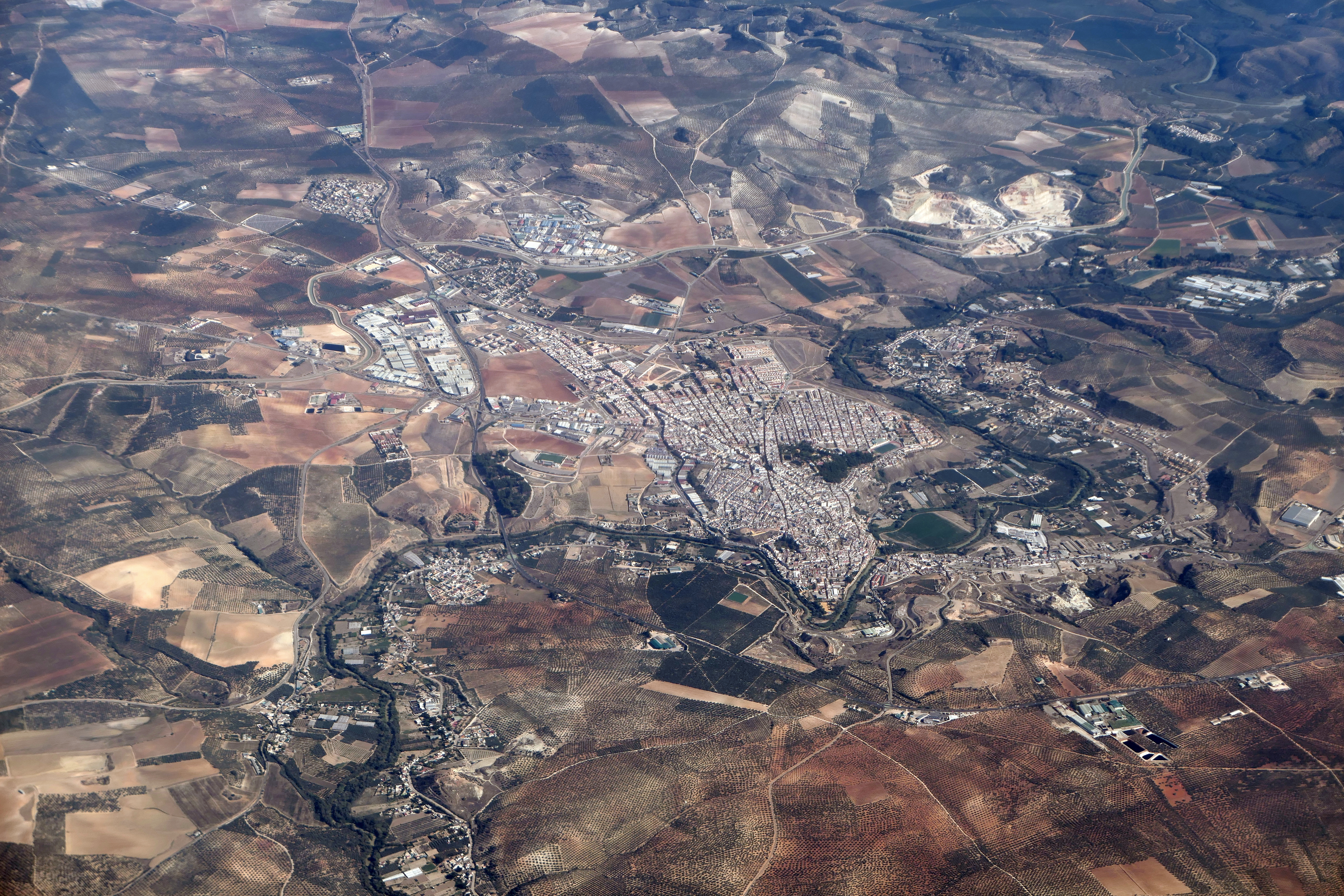
Puente Genil is the province of Córdoba's third largest municipality by population.

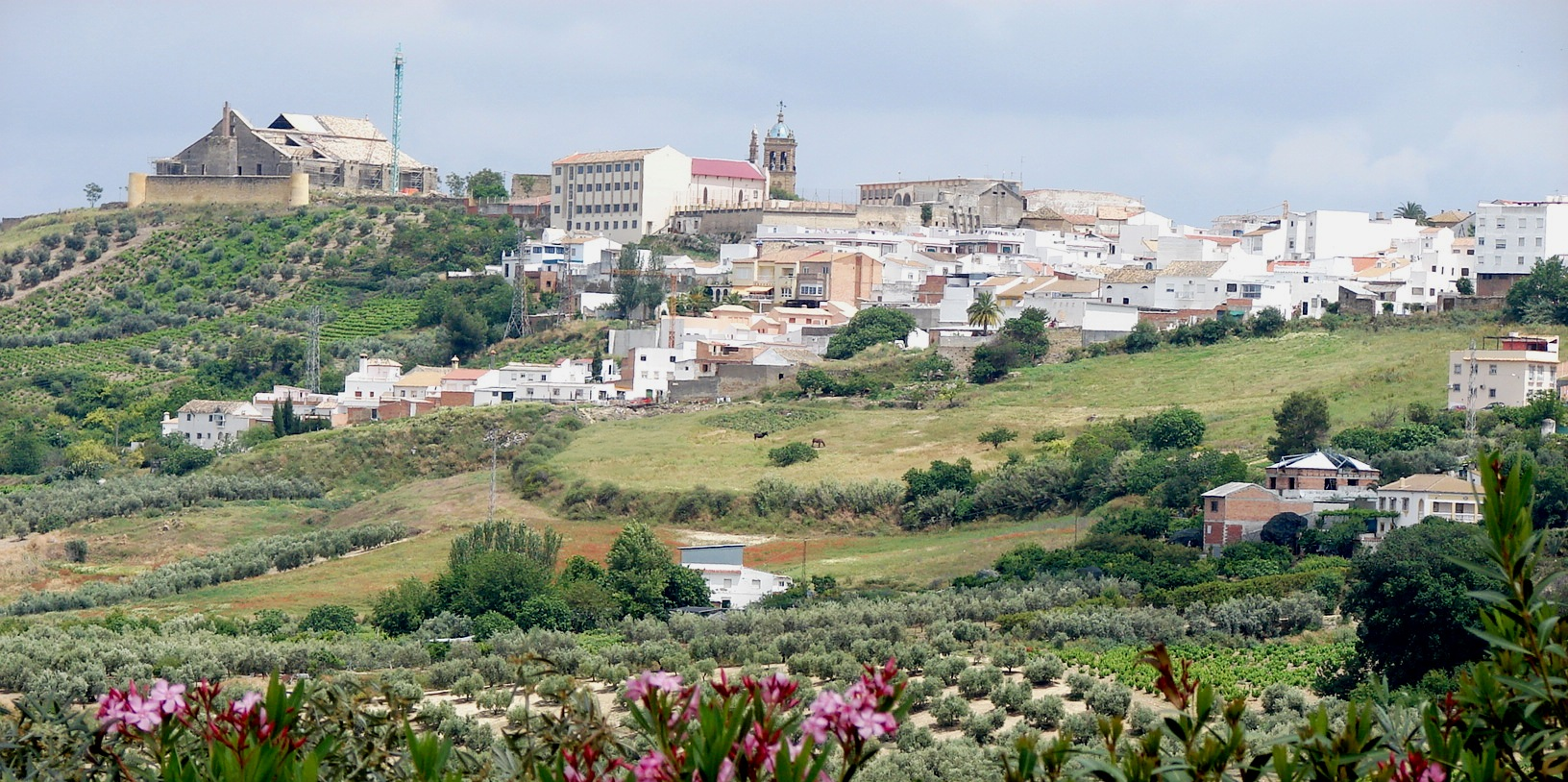
Montilla, the province of Córdoba's fourth largest municipality by population

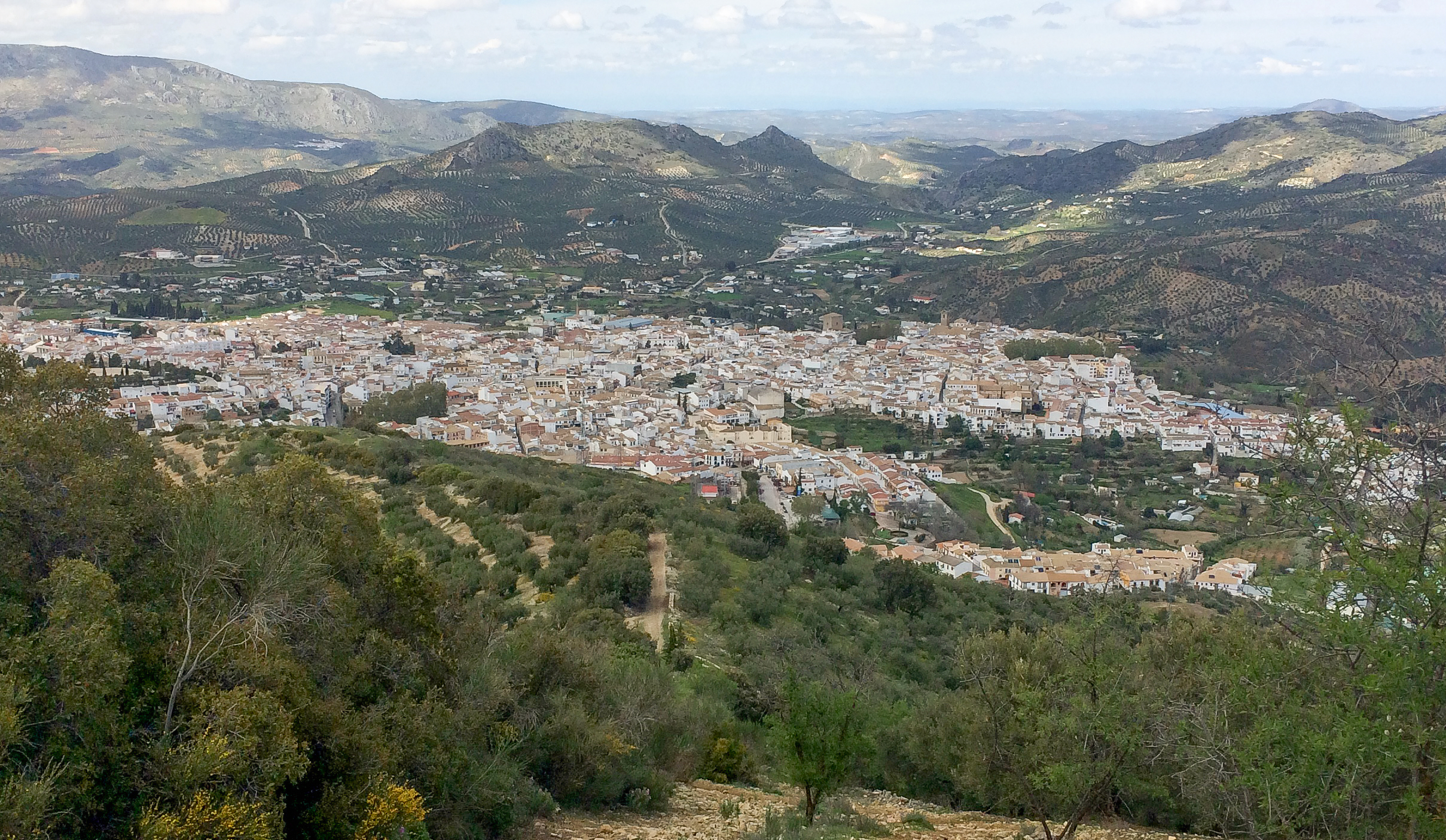
Priego de Córdoba is the province of Córdoba's fifth largest municipality by population.

† Provincial capital

Municipalities in the province of Córdoba
Name	Population (2024 census)	Population (2011 census)	Population change	Land area (km²)	Population density (2024)
Adamuz	4,088	4,416	−7.4%	334.98	12.2/km^{2}
Aguilar de la Frontera	13,185	13,670	−3.5%	166.01	79.4/km^{2}
Alcaracejos	1,502	1,531	−1.9%	175.87	8.5/km^{2}
Almedinilla	2,325	2,508	−7.3%	55.52	41.9/km^{2}
Almodóvar del Río	7,981	7,993	−0.2%	172.53	46.3/km^{2}
Añora	1,507	1,572	−4.1%	112.25	13.4/km^{2}
Baena	18,360	20,061	−8.5%	362.40	50.7/km^{2}
Belalcázar	3,096	3,480	−11.0%	356.00	8.7/km^{2}
Belmez	2,847	3,205	−11.2%	207.39	13.7/km^{2}
Benamejí	4,910	5,129	−4.3%	53.35	92.0/km^{2}
Los Blázquez	635	724	−12.3%	102.44	6.2/km^{2}
Bujalance	7,145	7,879	−9.3%	124.81	57.2/km^{2}
Cabra	20,016	21,085	−5.1%	229.08	87.4/km^{2}
Cañete de las Torres	2,797	3,141	−11.0%	103.52	27.0/km^{2}
Carcabuey	2,308	2,666	−13.4%	79.82	28.9/km^{2}
Cardeña	1,425	1,662	−14.3%	513.78	2.8/km^{2}
La Carlota	14,377	13,764	+4.5%	79.26	181.4/km^{2}
El Carpio	4,323	4,551	−5.0%	46.68	92.6/km^{2}
Castro del Río	7,614	8,062	−5.6%	219.74	34.7/km^{2}
Conquista	371	455	−18.5%	38.77	9.6/km^{2}
Córdoba†	324,902	328,326	−1.0%	1,254.62	259.0/km^{2}
Doña Mencía	4,478	4,966	−9.8%	15.31	292.5/km^{2}
Dos Torres	2,379	2,513	−5.3%	129.06	18.4/km^{2}
Encinas Reales	2,238	2,372	−5.6%	33.36	67.1/km^{2}
Espejo	3,178	3,569	−11.0%	56.48	56.3/km^{2}
Espiel	2,338	2,452	−4.6%	437.27	5.3/km^{2}
Fernán-Núñez	9,635	9,802	−1.7%	30.49	316.0/km^{2}
Fuente Carreteros	1,065	No data (Note: Fuente Carreteros was partitioned from Fuente Palmera and became an independent municipality in 2018 and is thus not included in the 2011 census.)		9.35	113.9/km^{2}
Fuente la Lancha	388	372	+4.3%	7.83	49.6/km^{2}
Fuente Obejuna	4,357	5,133	−15.1%	591.39	7.4/km^{2}
Fuente Palmera	10,001	10,979	−8.9%	65.38	153.0/km^{2}
Fuente-Tójar	676	755	−10.5%	23.66	28.6/km^{2}
La Granjuela	412	509	−19.1%	56.15	7.3/km^{2}
Guadalcázar	1,549	1,620	−4.4%	72.18	21.5/km^{2}
La Guijarrosa	1,359	No data (Note: La Guijarrosa was partitioned from Santaella and became an independent municipality in 2018 and is thus not included in the 2011 census.)		45.66	29.8/km^{2}
El Guijo	344	415	−17.1%	67.40	5.1/km^{2}
Hinojosa del Duque	6,543	7,270	−10.0%	531.47	12.3/km^{2}
Hornachuelos	4,388	4,690	−6.4%	909.20	4.8/km^{2}
Iznájar	3,742	4,592	−18.5%	136.80	27.4/km^{2}
Lucena	43,040	42,355	+1.6%	352.05	122.3/km^{2}
Luque	2,817	3,279	−14.1%	140.69	20.0/km^{2}
Montalbán de Córdoba	4,435	4,582	−3.2%	34.15	129.9/km^{2}
Montemayor	3,896	4,112	−5.3%	58.46	66.6/km^{2}
Montilla	22,315	23,797	−6.2%	169.03	132.0/km^{2}
Montoro	9,034	9,818	−8.0%	585.42	15.4/km^{2}
Monturque	1,935	1,986	−2.6%	32.54	59.5/km^{2}
Moriles	3,640	3,905	−6.8%	19.59	185.8/km^{2}
Nueva Carteya	5,312	5,646	−5.9%	69.33	76.6/km^{2}
Obejo	2,090	2,011	+3.9%	214.65	9.7/km^{2}
Palenciana	1,432	1,629	−12.1%	16.13	88.8/km^{2}
Palma del Río	20,605	21,454	−4.0%	200.19	102.9/km^{2}
Pedro Abad	2,825	2,949	−4.2%	23.46	120.4/km^{2}
Pedroche	1,456	1,637	−11.1%	121.65	12.0/km^{2}
Peñarroya-Pueblonuevo	10,280	11,639	−11.7%	64.88	158.4/km^{2}
Posadas	7,222	7,585	−4.8%	160.28	45.1/km^{2}
Pozoblanco	16,908	17,710	−4.5%	329.91	51.3/km^{2}
Priego de Córdoba	21,851	23,408	−6.7%	288.27	75.8/km^{2}
Puente Genil	29,879	30,304	−1.4%	170.76	175.0/km^{2}
La Rambla	7,466	7,622	−2.0%	135.08	55.3/km^{2}
Rute	9,753	10,532	−7.4%	131.93	73.9/km^{2}
San Sebastián de los Ballesteros	854	840	+1.7%	10.51	81.3/km^{2}
Santaella	4,679	6,125	−23.6%	226.14	20.7/km^{2}
Santa Eufemia	710	930	−23.7%	187.83	3.8/km^{2}
Torrecampo	1,000	1,250	−20.0%	196.60	5.1/km^{2}
Valenzuela	1,041	1,317	−21.0%	19.04	54.7/km^{2}
Valsequillo	361	399	−9.5%	122.03	3.0/km^{2}
La Victoria	2,328	2,369	−1.7%	19.44	119.8/km^{2}
Villa del Río	6,872	7,426	−7.5%	22.07	311.4/km^{2}
Villafranca de Córdoba	4,875	4,810	+1.4%	58.32	83.6/km^{2}
Villaharta	626	757	−17.3%	11.96	52.3/km^{2}
Villanueva de Córdoba	8,371	9,419	−11.1%	429.52	19.5/km^{2}
Villanueva del Duque	1,406	1,610	−12.7%	137.55	10.2/km^{2}
Villanueva del Rey	1,013	1,163	−12.9%	215.80	4.7/km^{2}
Villaralto	1,075	1,281	−16.1%	24.18	44.5/km^{2}
Villaviciosa de Córdoba	3,060	3,532	−13.4%	468.74	6.5/km^{2}
El Viso	2,511	2,767	−9.3%	254.36	9.9/km^{2}
Zuheros	606	733	−17.3%	42.21	14.4/km^{2}
Province of Córdoba	774,313	802,577	−3.5%	13,771.97	56.2/km^{2}
Andalusia	8,631,862	8,371,270	+3.1%	87,587.59	98.6/km^{2}
Spain	48,619,695	46,815,916	+3.9%	504,755.17	96.3/km^{2}

== See also ==
- Geography of Spain
- List of municipalities of Spain
