= Fuente Palmera =

- Municipality
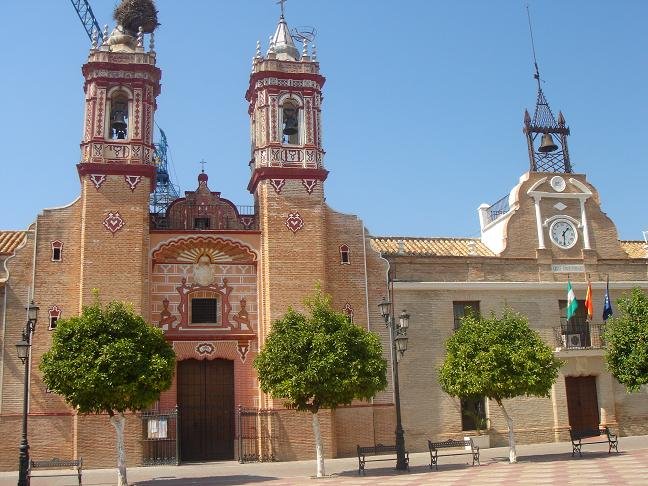
- Church and Town Hall

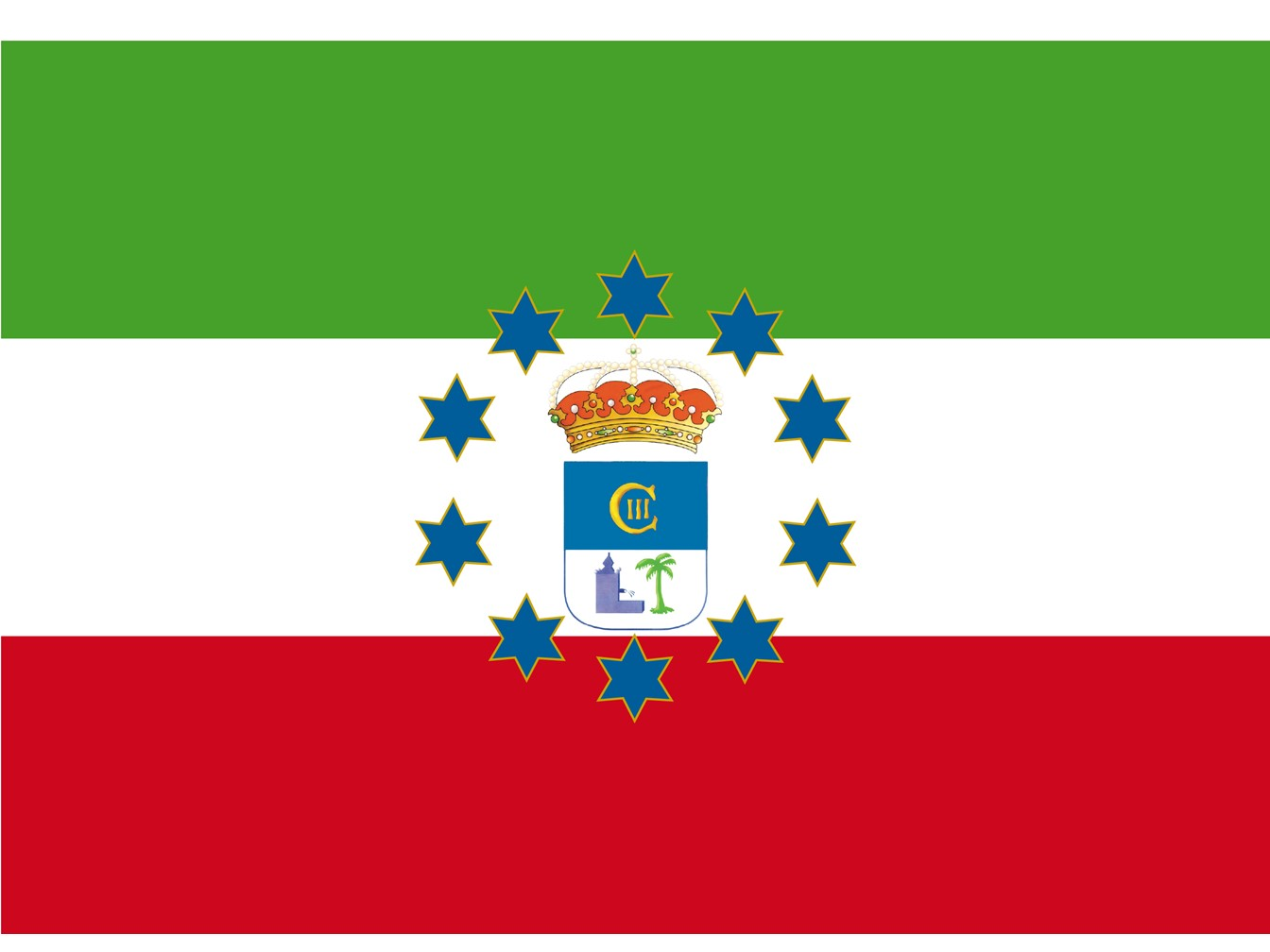
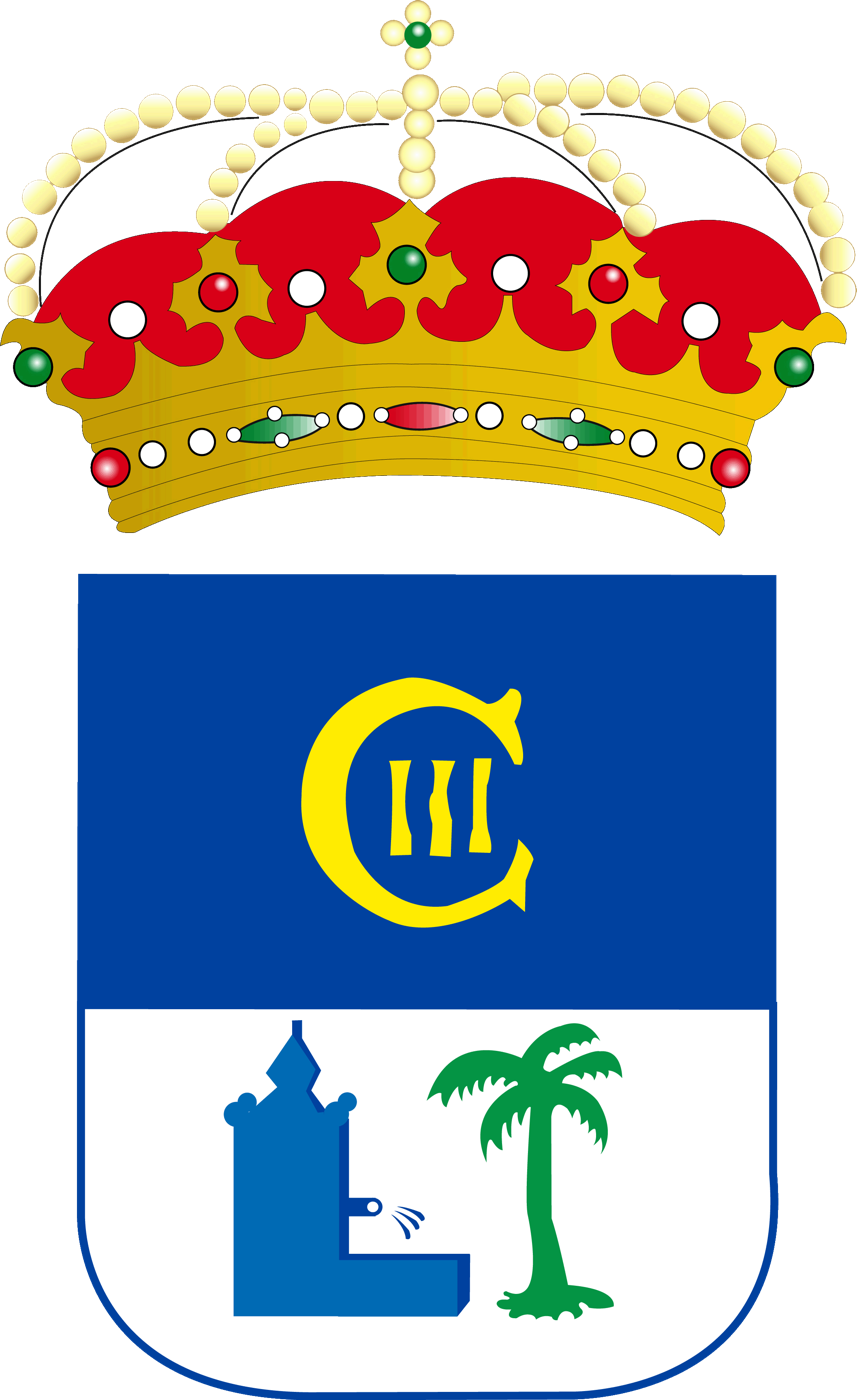
- Flag Seal

- Location within Province of Córdoba (Spain) Location within Andalusia Location within Spain
- Coordinates: 37.703235°N 5.104126°W
- Country: Spain
- Autonomous community: Andalusia
- Province: Córdoba
- Comarca: Valle Medio del Guadalquivir
- Municipality: Fuente Palmera

Area
  - Total: 76 km^{2} (29 sq mi)
- Elevation: 158 m (518 ft)

Population (2025-01-01)
  - Total: 9,883
  - Density: 130/km^{2} (340/sq mi)
- Time zone: UTC+1 (CET)
  - Summer (DST): UTC+2 (CEST)
- Website: www.fuentepalmera.es

Fuente Palmera is a Spanish municipality in the province of Córdoba, Andalusia. Much of its territory, the district of El Villar, forms an enclave surrounded by land in the province of Seville. Currently it is known for having a large industry and for its trade, dedicated to the activity of wedding dresses.

== Toponymy ==
It is understood that the term Fuente Palmera comes from the historical fountain next to which the population center was founded and from the presence of wild palm groves in the area. It should not be confused, in this case, and for the formation of the name, palm tree with palmetto (Chamaerops humilis).

Historical documents, such as the Ensenada Cadastre, attest to the existence of the toponym before the colonization of Carlos III.

== Geography ==
Its location is within the Middle Guadalquivir Valley, and specifically in the so-called La Parrilla Desert, an area with a desert tendency but rich in irrigated crops, very close to the Guadalquivir and Genil rivers.

=== Climate ===
Fuente Palmera has a mediterranean climate (Csa) on the Köppen climate classification, with very hot, dry summers and mild, moderately wet winters. Due to its location in the Guadalquivir valley, its summers are among the hottest in Europe and temperatures exceed 40 °C (104 °F) every year.

Climate data for Fuente Palmera (2010-2025), extremes (2010-present)
Month	Jan	Feb	Mar	Apr	May	Jun	Jul	Aug	Sep	Oct	Nov	Dec	Year
Record high °C (°F)	24.1 (75.4)	24.9 (76.8)	32.4 (90.3)	38.5 (101.3)	40.7 (105.3)	43.1 (109.6)	45.5 (113.9)	46.4 (115.5)	44.1 (111.4)	37.3 (99.1)	27.9 (82.2)	22.9 (73.2)	46.4 (115.5)
Mean daily maximum °C (°F)	15.4 (59.7)	17.4 (63.3)	20.0 (68.0)	23.7 (74.7)	29.0 (84.2)	33.2 (91.8)	37.4 (99.3)	37.4 (99.3)	31.9 (89.4)	26.7 (80.1)	19.2 (66.6)	16.1 (61.0)	25.6 (78.1)
Daily mean °C (°F)	10.2 (50.4)	11.8 (53.2)	14.1 (57.4)	17.4 (63.3)	21.6 (70.9)	25.5 (77.9)	28.9 (84.0)	29.1 (84.4)	24.9 (76.8)	20.5 (68.9)	14.3 (57.7)	11.2 (52.2)	19.1 (66.4)
Mean daily minimum °C (°F)	5.0 (41.0)	6.2 (43.2)	8.1 (46.6)	11.1 (52.0)	14.2 (57.6)	17.8 (64.0)	20.4 (68.7)	20.8 (69.4)	17.8 (64.0)	14.3 (57.7)	9.3 (48.7)	6.2 (43.2)	12.6 (54.7)
Record low °C (°F)	−3.0 (26.6)	−3.2 (26.2)	−1.7 (28.9)	3.9 (39.0)	5.7 (42.3)	10.5 (50.9)	15.3 (59.5)	15.8 (60.4)	11.4 (52.5)	5.9 (42.6)	1.5 (34.7)	−1.2 (29.8)	−3.2 (26.2)
Average precipitation mm (inches)	47.4 (1.87)	56.8 (2.24)	93.5 (3.68)	60.5 (2.38)	27.6 (1.09)	8.4 (0.33)	0.1 (0.00)	10.7 (0.42)	24.8 (0.98)	80.8 (3.18)	91.5 (3.60)	72.5 (2.85)	574.6 (22.62)
Source: Agencia Estatal de Meteorologia (AEMET OpenData)

== See also ==
- List of municipalities in Córdoba
