= Fuente Carreteros =

- Municipality
- Flag Coat of arms

- Location in Spain
- Coordinates: 37°40′12″N 5°19′18″W
- Country: Spain
- Autonomous community: Andalusia
- Province: Córdoba
- Comarca: Valle Medio del Guadalquivir
- Judicial district: Posadas

Government
  - Alcalde: José Manuel Pedrosa Portero

Area
  - Total: 9.26 km^{2} (3.58 sq mi)
- Elevation: 158 m (518 ft)

Population (2020)
  - Total: 1,148
  - Density: 124/km^{2} (321/sq mi)
- Time zone: UTC+1 (CET)
  - Summer (DST): UTC+2 (CEST)
- Website: Official website

Fuente Carreteros is a municipality located in the Province of Córdoba, in the autonomous community of Andalusia, Spain.
