= Obejo =

- Municipality

- Seal

- Location in Spain.
- Coordinates: 38°8′N 4°48′W
- Country: Spain
- Autonomous community: Andalusia
- Province: Córdoba
- Comarca: Valle del Guadiato

Government
  - Mayor: María Dolores López Cano

Area
  - Total: 214 km^{2} (83 sq mi)
- Elevation: 707 m (2,320 ft)

Population (2025-01-01)
  - Total: 2,101
  - Density: 9.82/km^{2} (25.4/sq mi)
- Time zone: UTC+1 (CET)
  - Summer (DST): UTC+2 (CEST)

Obejo is a municipality located in the province of Córdoba, Andalusia, Spain. The photograph known as The Falling Soldier was taken in the south of this municipality in 1936.

== See also ==
- List of municipalities in Córdoba
