= La Carlota, Spain =

La Carlota
- Municipality
- Flag Coat of arms

- Location in Spain
- Coordinates: 37°40′N 4°56′W
- Country: Spain
- Autonomous community: Andalusia
- Province: Córdoba
- Comarca: Valle Medio del Guadalquivir

Government
  - Mayor: Antonio Granados Miranda (PSOE)

Area
  - Total: 78.97 km^{2} (30.49 sq mi)
- Elevation: 228 m (748 ft)

Population (2025-01-01)
  - Total: 14,503
  - Density: 183.7/km^{2} (475.7/sq mi)
- Demonym: Carloteños
- Time zone: UTC+1 (CET)
  - Summer (DST): UTC+2 (CEST)
- Postal code: 14100
- Website: Official website

La Carlota is a municipality of small settlements, in the southern half of Spain near Córdoba. In 2005 it had 11,488 inhabitants, and in 2018 just over 14,000, all living in a predominantly rural area measuring some 80 square kilometres (31 sq mi).

== Government and locality ==
La Carlota is 30 km (19 mi) from the provincial capital city of Córdoba, and is governed as a province of that city. Yet the area has had a curious history, which means that it is today divided into 11 districts: the village municipality of La Carlota and ten smaller 'departments' or hamlets. These 'departments' are:

- First department: La Paz
- Second department: Los Algarbes
- Third department: Monte Alto
- Fourth department: Arrecife
- Fifth department: El Garabato
- Sixth department: La Chica Carlota. Its former name was Petit Carlota (1768).
- Seventh department: Las Pinedas
- Eighth department: El Rinconcillo
- Ninth department: Fuencubierta
- Tenth department: Aldea Quintana

La Carlota borders the province of Seville to the west and south, and to the north is the town of Guadalcázar.

== Terrain and weather ==
La Carlota is located in the Cordoban countryside, well south-west of the large regional capital of Cordoba, and it occupies part of the alluvial valley of the River Guadalquivir and an area of its Quaternary terraces. This means that La Carlota and La Chica Carlota are sited astride and alongside large steams that come down from the Guadalquivir river and the mountains to the north.

The terrain of the countryside is soft and gently rolling and without extreme slopes, though mountains may be glimpsed on the far horizons. The main economic activity is agriculture and traditional products: dry cereals; olive groves; vineyards; sunflowers; sugar beet; and cotton. The production of certain high-value types of fresh agricultural produce is favoured, due to easy access to urban consumers in two provincial capitals. High-speed Internet is ubiquitous and, as automated/robotic and low-water precision agricultural techniques advance, this factor may also become important for future agricultural production.

The area has weather that is typical of the area, sharing inland Spain's very high temperatures in summer. The winters are deemed semifrías or 'semi-cold' by local people, although visitors from northern Europe might find them rather pleasant. There is, of course, a level of aridity in the area. There is little annual rainfall exceeding 600 mm and this leaves an annual deficit in the hydrological balance.

== History ==
The populations resident here in pre-historic, Ancient Roman and Medieval times are amply discussed in D. Antonio Martínez Castro's PhD thesis El Poblamiento Desde La Antigüedad A La Edad Moderna En La Subcomarca Cordobesa de Las Nuevas Poblaciones: El Ejemplo De La Carlota.

La Carlota was founded in 1767. King Charles III of Spain wished to colonize some depopulated areas of the Guadalquivir valley and Sierra Morena. This grand project established three main settlement areas: La Carolina (Jaén), La Carlota (Córdoba), and La Luisiana (Seville). The aim of this colonization was on the one hand to protect the stagecoach traffic from petty banditry, and on the other hand to once again establish productive farms. About six thousand German and Flemish Catholic settlers, plus some Catalans and Valencians, came as new settlers. Of those 6,000 colonists, approximately 1,600 settled in Carlota. This is why Central European surnames and ethnic features and characteristics are common among the inhabitants, and why pork stew and sausages boiled in wine are favourite local dishes. Settlers were given 28 bushels of farmland, a house, household animals such as dogs, suitable agricultural implements and tax exemption for ten years.

As well as influence from German and Flemish settlers there also followed a significant French influence, which led to the local administrative form of having "departments" instead of villages. For the same reason, the street plans of most of the main La Carlota settlement, and nearly all of its villages, have grids of roads and lanes set at right-angles.

An early history of the district is by Fernández Cabezas, En la Retaguardia: Coleccion de cronicas de La Carlota (Cordoba), Imprenta A. Santos (1937). There was also a special issue of the Boletin de la Real Academia de Córdoba (Bulletin of the Royal Academy of Cordoba, No.88, 1968) devoted to the history of the foundation of the new towns and villages, which introduced historians to a series of conferences held on the topic. A substantial and accessible modern book on the history of the district was published in 2014, Las Raíces de la Tierra: La aventura de los colonos (The Roots of the Earth: adventures of the settlers), by the poet and short-story author J.J. Mugar. The author's fiction and poetry also features the area as a setting.

The writer, poet and diarist Juan Bernier (1911-1990) was born and raised in La Carlota. His Poesía completa (Complete Poetry) was published as a book in 2011.

== Recreation ==
6km to the north is Spain's longest "Via Verde" (or 'Railway Path' in English). This former railway line, closed in 1970, gently rolls across the countryside through fields of sunflowers and olive groves for over 90 km (56 mi). It runs between the southwest edge of Cordoba and Marchena in Seville. The "Via Verde" is most visited by tourists in the springtime, when wildflowers abound, and electric bicycles are now extending the types of weather in which cyclists can enjoy the path.

In recent years a number of off-road hiking trails have been tested and mapped by "Ramarvid", including six around La Carlota and three from La Chica Carlota.

Further afield, some 30 km (19 mi) away to the north are the southern parts of the Parque Natural Sierra de Hornachuelos, a natural park that is one of the best conserved areas of Mediterranean riverine upland forest, in which oaks predominate. Some 90 km (56 mi) to the south is the nearest seaside resort and coastline, at Málaga.

== Cultural events ==
- Cabalgata de los Reyes Magos, January 5
- La Candelaria, February 1 and 2
- Día de Andalucía, February 28
- Feria del libro, April 24
- Fiesta del día de la Cruz, feria y fiestas de Aldea Quintana. Décimo Departamento (recomendada, todas las ferias de la zona comienzan con ésta), May 3
- Romería de San Isidro, May 15
- San Pedro y San Pablo (Feria y Fiestas de Montealto), June 29
- Feria y Fiestas de la paz, July 1
- Día de la Colonización, July 5
- Mercado Colono local, second weekend of July
- Feria y Fiesta de Los Algarbes, July 16
- Santiago Apóstol, feria y fiestas de El Garabato, July 25
- Día de la Virgen de los Ángeles, feria y fiestas de Las Pinedas, August 2
- Virgen del Tránsito y Virgen de Agosto, feria y fiestas de La Chica Carlota y El Rinconcillo respectivamente, August 15
- Verbena del Emigrante, August 28
- Feria y Fiestas de la Fuencubierta, August 30
- Fiestas del Santísimo Cristo de la Misercordia, September 14–17
- Fiesta de la Virgen del Rosario, patrona de la Carlota, October 7
- Día de la Constitución, December 6

The Dia de la Colonizacion ('Day of the Colonists') is celebrated each 5 July and marks the arrival of the new and hardy colonists from northern Europe. There is a cultural festival, an eighteenth century market, and a contest for flamenco dancers.

== See also ==
- La Carolina
- List of municipalities in Córdoba
