= Campiña de Baena =

- Comarca
- Coordinates: 37°40′11″N 4°24′35″W
- Country: Spain
- Autonomous community: Andalusia
- Province: Córdoba

Area
  - Total: 725 km^{2} (280 sq mi)

Population (2014)
  - Total: 39,260
  - Density: 54.2/km^{2} (140/sq mi)

Campiña de Baena is a Mancomunidad and comarca in the province of Córdoba, Spain. It contains the following municipalities:

- Baena
- Castro del Río
- Espejo
- Nueva Carteya
- Valenzuela
