= Hinojosa del Duque =

- Municipality
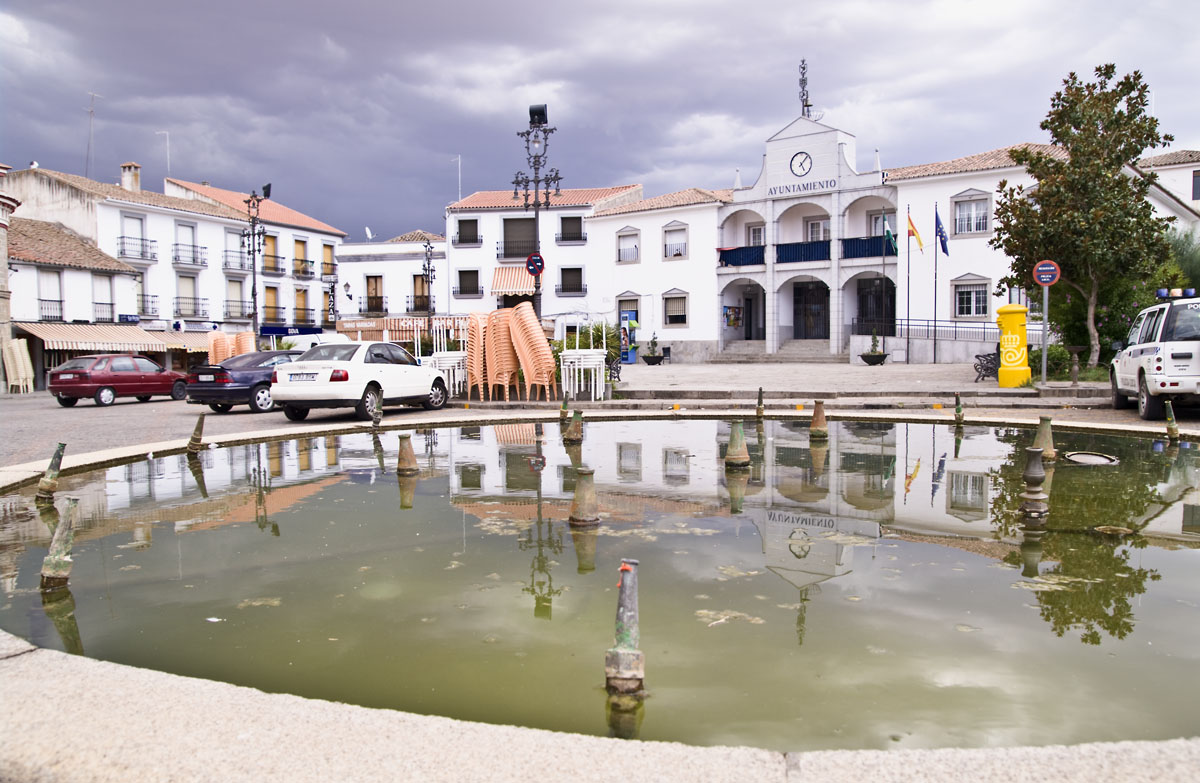
- Town Hall.

- Seal

- Location of Hinojosa del Duque in Spain
- Coordinates: 38°30′N 5°08′W
- Country: Spain
- Province: Córdoba
- Comarca: Los Pedroches

Government
  - Mayor: José Fernández

Area
  - Total: 531.47 km^{2} (205.20 sq mi)
- Elevation: 542 m (1,778 ft)

Population (2025-01-01)
  - Total: 6,534
  - Density: 12.29/km^{2} (31.84/sq mi)
- Time zone: UTC+1 (CET)
  - Summer (DST): UTC+2 (CEST)
- Website: Official website

Hinojosa del Duque is a municipality located in the province of Córdoba, Spain. According to the 2014 census, the municipality has a population of 7,126 inhabitants.

== Twin towns ==
- Cerdanyola del Vallès, Spain
- İslahiye, Turkey
- Kozmodemyansk, Russia

== See also ==
- Battle of Valsequillo
- List of municipalities in Córdoba
