= Los Blázquez =

- town
- Flag Seal

- Location in Spain
- Coordinates: 38°24′N 5°26′W
- Country: Spain
- Province: Córdoba
- Comarca: Valle del Guadiato

Government
  - Mayor: Francisco Ángel Martín Molina

Area
  - Total: 102 km^{2} (39 sq mi)
- Elevation: 508 m (1,667 ft)

Population (2025-01-01)
  - Total: 619
  - Density: 6.07/km^{2} (15.7/sq mi)
- Demonym: Blazqueños
- Time zone: UTC+1 (CET)
  - Summer (DST): UTC+2 (CEST)

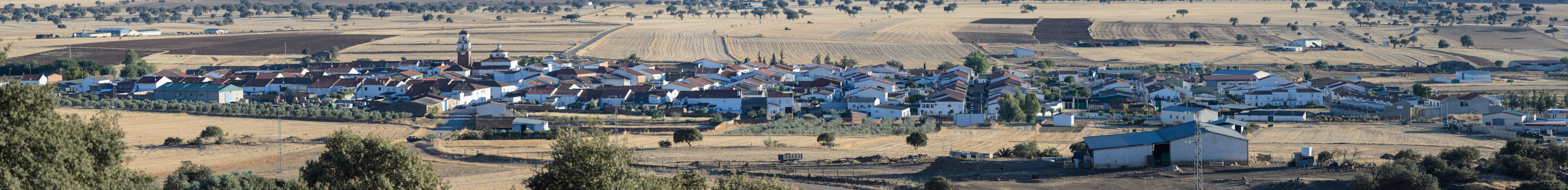
Panoramic view of Los Blázquez, Cordoba, Spain. (September 2016)

Los Blázquez is a town in the province of Córdoba, Spain. As of 2009, it had a population of 738 inhabitants. During the Spanish Civil War in 1938, Los Blazquez placed a key role.

== See also ==
- List of municipalities in Córdoba
