= Palenciana =

- Municipality
- Flag Seal
- Interactive map of Palenciana
- Coordinates: 37°15′N 4°35′W
- Country: Spain
- Province: Córdoba
- Municipality: Palenciana

Area
  - Total: 17 km^{2} (6.6 sq mi)
- Elevation: 399 m (1,309 ft)

Population (2025-01-01)
  - Total: 1,431
  - Density: 84/km^{2} (220/sq mi)
- Time zone: UTC+1 (CET)
  - Summer (DST): UTC+2 (CEST)

Palenciana is a municipality located in the province of Córdoba, Spain. According to the 2024 census (INE), the city has a population of 1,431 inhabitants. It is located in the comarca Subbética, at an altitude of 399 meters, 104 kilometers from the provincial capital, Córdoba.

== See also ==
- List of municipalities in Córdoba
