= La Rambla, Spain =

La Rambla may refer to:

- La Rambla, Barcelona, Spain;
- La Rambla, Córdoba, Spain;
