= Campiña Sur (Córdoba) =

Coordinates: 37°33′26″N 4°42′44″W

- Comarca
- Location of Campiña Sur in the province of Córdoba.
- Country: Spain
- Autonomous community: Andalusia
- Province: Córdoba
- Capital: Puente Genil
- Municipalities: List: Aguilar de la Frontera, Fernán Núñez, Montalbán de Córdoba, Montemayor, Montilla, Monturque, Moriles, Puente Genil, La Rambla, San Sebastián de los Ballesteros, Santaella

Area
  - Total: 1,101.8 km^{2} (425.4 sq mi)

Population (2009)
  - Total: 106,489
  - Density: 96.650/km^{2} (250.32/sq mi)
- Time zone: UTC+1 (CET)
  - Summer (DST): UTC+2 (CEST)

The Campiña Sur, officially the Mancomunidad de la Campiña Sur Cordobesa, is a Spanish comarca of the province of Córdoba, in the autonomous community of Andalusia. It is formed by 11 municipalities and is between the Subbética Mountains and the Guadalquivir Valley, in the south-west of the province. Its capital is the city of Puente Genil, which is also the third largest city in the province, after Córdoba (which is the provincial capital) and Lucena.

== Municipalities ==
- Aguilar de la Frontera (13,746 inhabitants)
- Fernán Núñez (9,701 inhabitants)
- Montalbán de Córdoba (4,591 inhabitants)
- Montemayor (4,071 inhabitants)
- Montilla (23,840 inhabitants)
- Monturque (2,021 inhabitants)
- Moriles (3,966 inhabitants)
- Puente Genil (30,033 inhabitants)
- La Rambla (7,601 inhabitants)
- San Sebastián de los Ballesteros (829 inhabitants)
- Santaella (6,090 inhabitants)

== See also ==
- Category:People from Campiña Sur (Córdoba)
