= Valsequillo, Spain =

Valsequillo
- Municipality
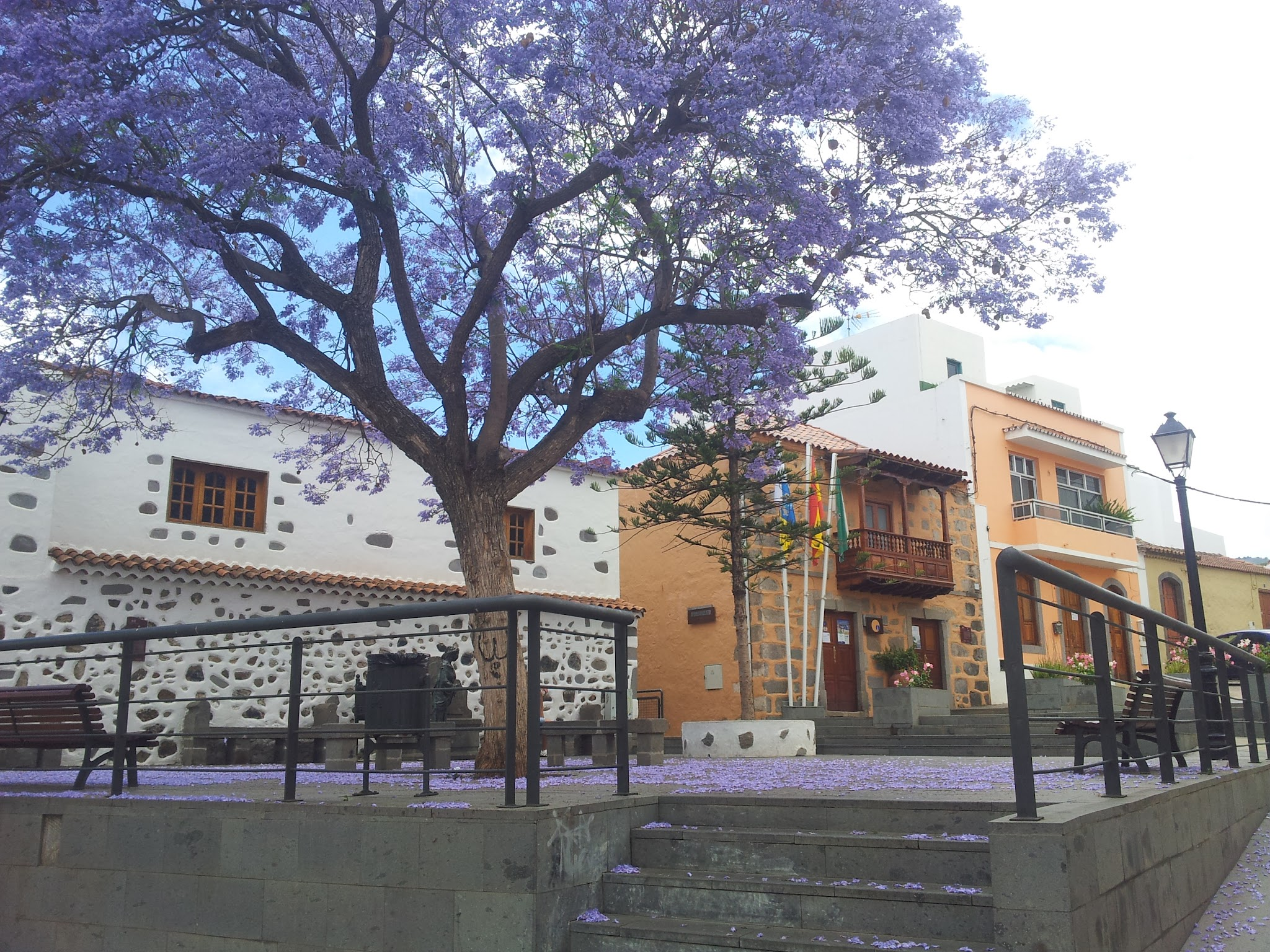
- Town hall

- Seal

- Location in Spain
- Coordinates: 38°24′N 5°21′W
- Country: Spain
- Autonomous community: Andalusia
- Province: Córdoba Province
- Comarca: Valle del Guadiato

Area
  - Total: 122 km^{2} (47 sq mi)
- Elevation: 581 m (1,906 ft)

Population (2025-01-01)
  - Total: 351
  - Density: 2.88/km^{2} (7.45/sq mi)
- Time zone: UTC+1 (CET)
  - Summer (DST): UTC+2 (CEST)

Valsequillo is a municipality in the province of Córdoba, Spain. According to the 2014 census, the municipality has a population of 385 inhabitants. Its postal code is 14206.

The town is located in the Sierra Morena, at the northern end of Córdoba Province near Extremadura.

== History ==
The Battle of Valsequillo took place in the area of the town, which was located near the Extremaduran front line between 5 January and 4 February 1939 during the Spanish Civil War.

== See also ==
- List of municipalities in Córdoba
