= Guijo =

Guijo may refer to several places in Spain:

- Guijo de Ávila, in the province of Salamanca in Castile and León
- Guijo de Coria, in the province of Cáceres in Extremadura
- Guijo de Galisteo, in the province of Cáceres in Extremadura
- Guijo de Granadilla, in the province of Cáceres in Extremadura
- Guijo de Santa Bárbara, in the province of Cáceres in Extremadura

== Other uses ==
- Guijo (Shorea guiso), a tree of the family Dipterocarpaceae

== See also ==
- El Guijo, in the province of Córdoba, Andalusia
