= La Granjuela =

- Municipality
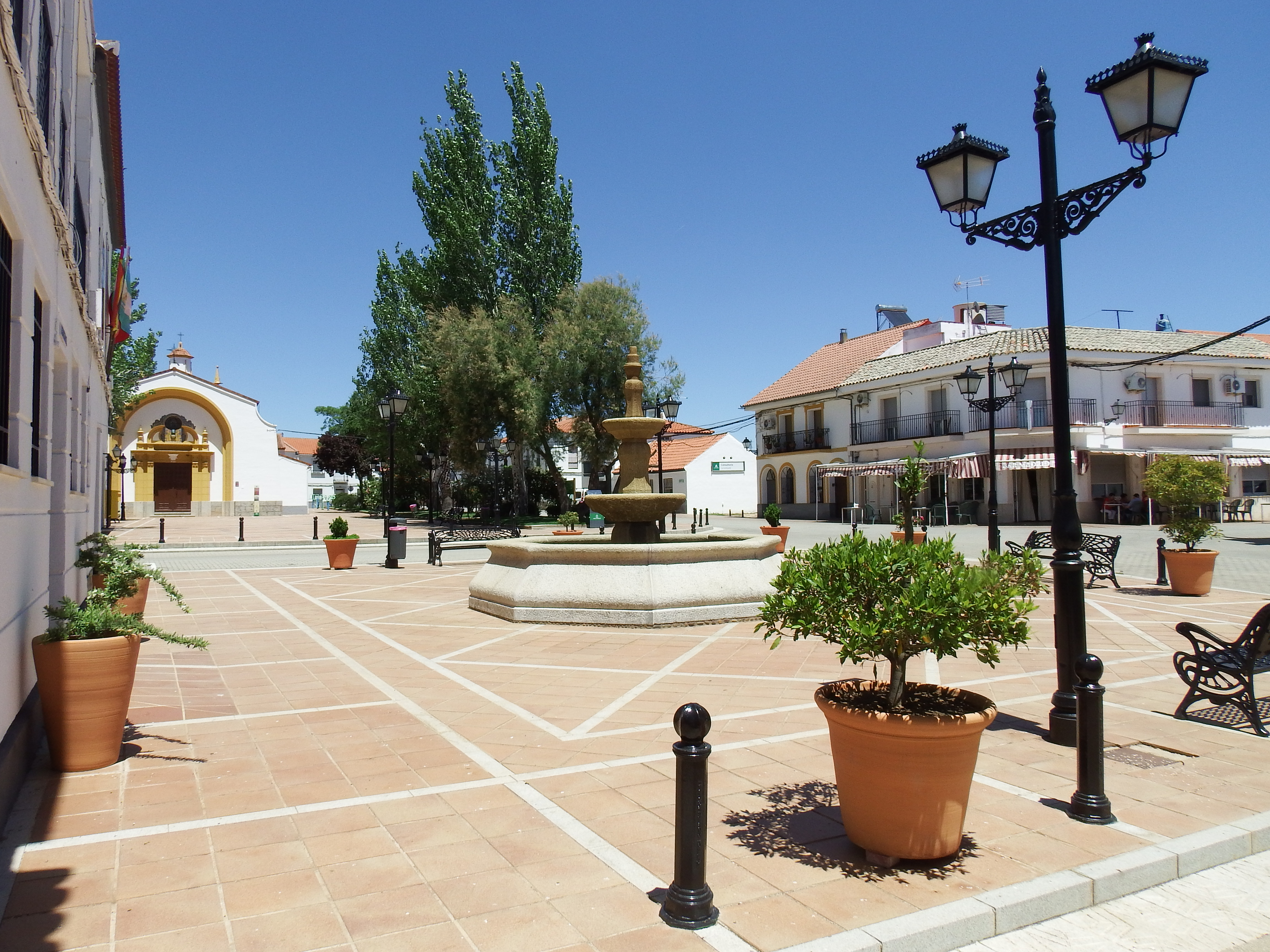

- Flag Seal
- Interactive map of La Granjuela
- Coordinates: 38°22′N 5°21′W
- Country: Spain
- Province: Córdoba
- Municipality: La Granjuela

Area
  - Total: 56 km^{2} (22 sq mi)
- Elevation: 554 m (1,818 ft)

Population (2025-01-01)
  - Total: 412
  - Density: 7.4/km^{2} (19/sq mi)
- Time zone: UTC+1 (CET)
  - Summer (DST): UTC+2 (CEST)

La Granjuela is a municipality located in the province of Córdoba, Spain. According to the 2006 census (INE), the city has a population of 501 inhabitants.

== See also ==
- List of municipalities in Córdoba
