= Baena, Spain =

Baena
- Municipality
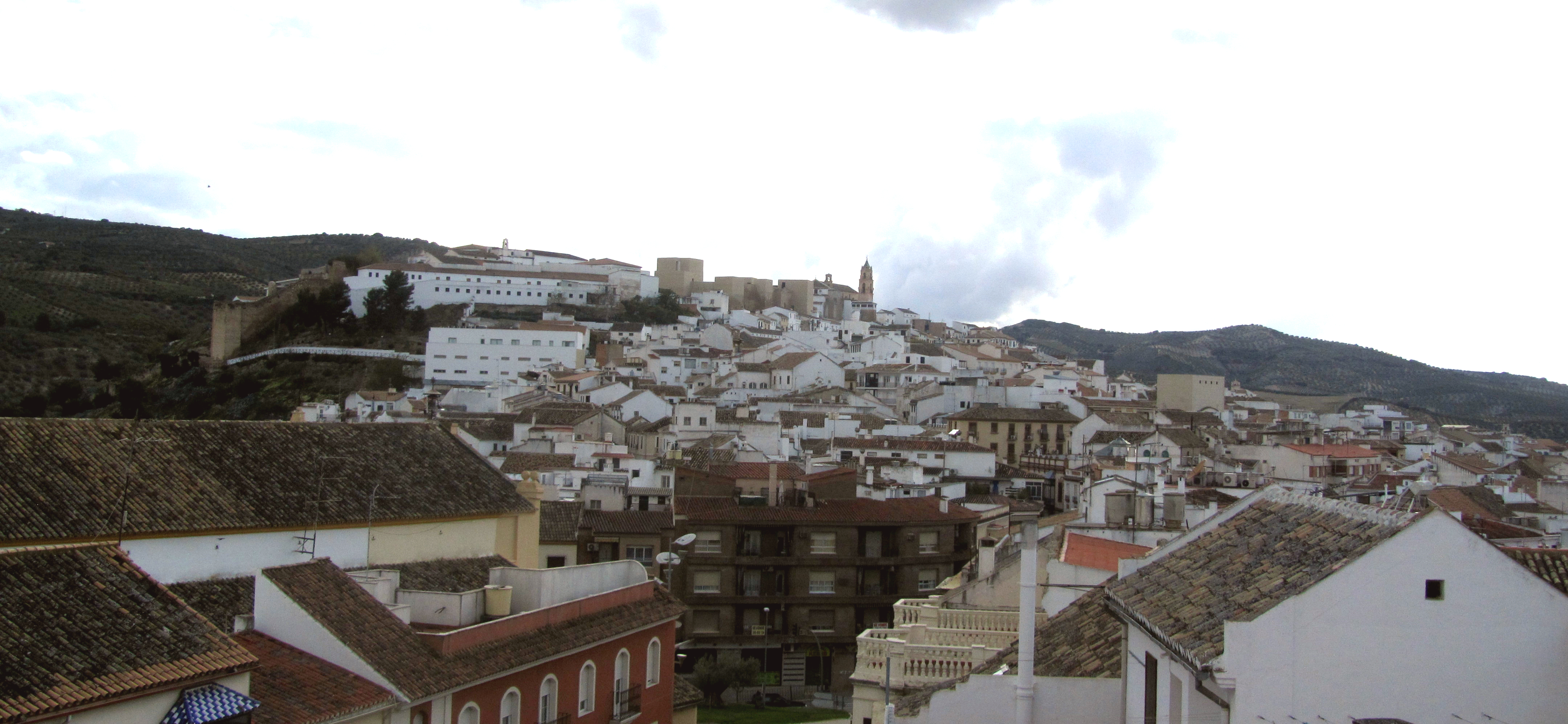

- Flag Coat of arms

- Location within Spain Location within Andalusia
- Coordinates: 37°36′52″N 4°19′32″W
- Country: Spain
- Autonomous community: Andalusia
- Province: Córdoba
- Comarca: Campiña de Baena

Government
  - Mayor: María Jesús Serrano (PSOE)

Area
  - Total: 362.5 km^{2} (140.0 sq mi)
- Elevation (AMSL): 405 m (1,329 ft)

Population (2025-01-01)
  - Total: 18,386
  - Density: 50.72/km^{2} (131.4/sq mi)
- Time zone: UTC+1 (CET)
  - Summer (DST): UTC+2 (CEST (GMT +2))
- Postal code: 14850
- Area code: +34 (Spain) + 957 (Córdoba)
- Website: Town Hall

Baena is a town and municipality of Spain located in the province of Córdoba, Andalusia. It is situated near the river Marbella on the slope of a hill 52 kilometres (32 mi) southeast of Córdoba by road. The population of the town is 20,266 (2012).

== History ==
At the site of the Roman town (Baniana or Biniana), In 1833, a subterranean vault was discovered, containing twelve cinerary urns with inscriptions commemorating members of the Pompeian family.

Following the demise of the Caliphate of Córdoba, the town was ravaged by Berbers, bringing its prosperity to an end.

Once conquered Córdoba, Ferdinand III rapidly acquired a number of towns in the Campiña—including Baena—in 1241, probably meeting no resistance.

The hill is crowned by fortifications. In 1292, Nasrid Granada, ruled by Muhammad II, unsuccessfully besieged the citadel, which was held for Sancho IV; the five Moorish heads in its coat-of-arms commemorates the occasion. The castile was a base for Gonzalo de Cordova and was held in the 19th century by the Altamira family. At that time, it held four parish churches and three schools conducted by sisters of charity. The girls' school held a high reputation in its province, despite not going beyond reading, writing, arithmetic, and religious instruction. Its population was around 12,000 in the 1870s and 15,000 by the turn of the century. Grain and olive oil were the principal articles of commerce in the 19th century; by the time of the First World War, horse-breeding and linen-weaving had also developed, despite the nearest railroad station being at Luque.

At the beginning of the Spanish Civil War the town was the scenario of the Baena Massacre, a mass execution of Spanish republicans where about 700 loyalists were murdered by the orders of rebel Colonel Sáenz de Buruaga following the killing of 99 Nationalists and their families who were being held hostage by Republican soldiers. Other estimates mention up to 2,000 victims following the brutal repression in Baena.

High-quality olive oil continues to be the mainstay of the local economy. Sierras Subbéticas Natural Park is located to the south of the town.

== Notable residents ==
- Gonzalo de Cordova
- Juan de Penalosa

== See also ==
- List of municipalities in Córdoba
