= Montemayor =

- Municipality
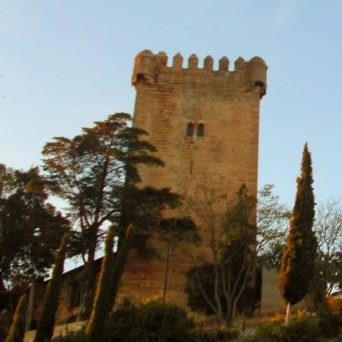
- Castle of Montemayor, Córdoba

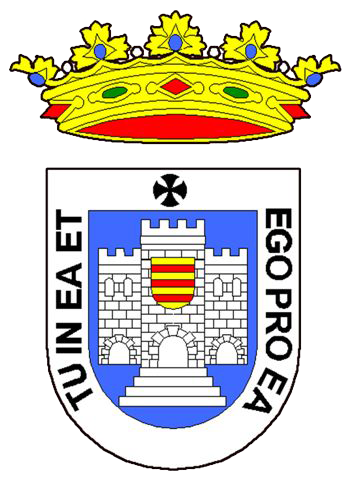
- Flag Seal
- Interactive map of Montemayor
- Coordinates: 37°39′N 4°42′W
- Country: Spain
- Province: Córdoba
- Municipality: Montemayor

Area
  - Total: 58 km^{2} (22 sq mi)
- Elevation: 413 m (1,355 ft)

Population (2025-01-01)
  - Total: 3,859
  - Density: 67/km^{2} (170/sq mi)
- Time zone: UTC+1 (CET)
  - Summer (DST): UTC+2 (CEST)

Montemayor is a municipality located in the province of Córdoba, Spain. According to the 2006 census (INE), the city has a population of 3,936 inhabitants.

== See also ==
- List of municipalities in Córdoba
