= Nueva Carteya =

- Municipality
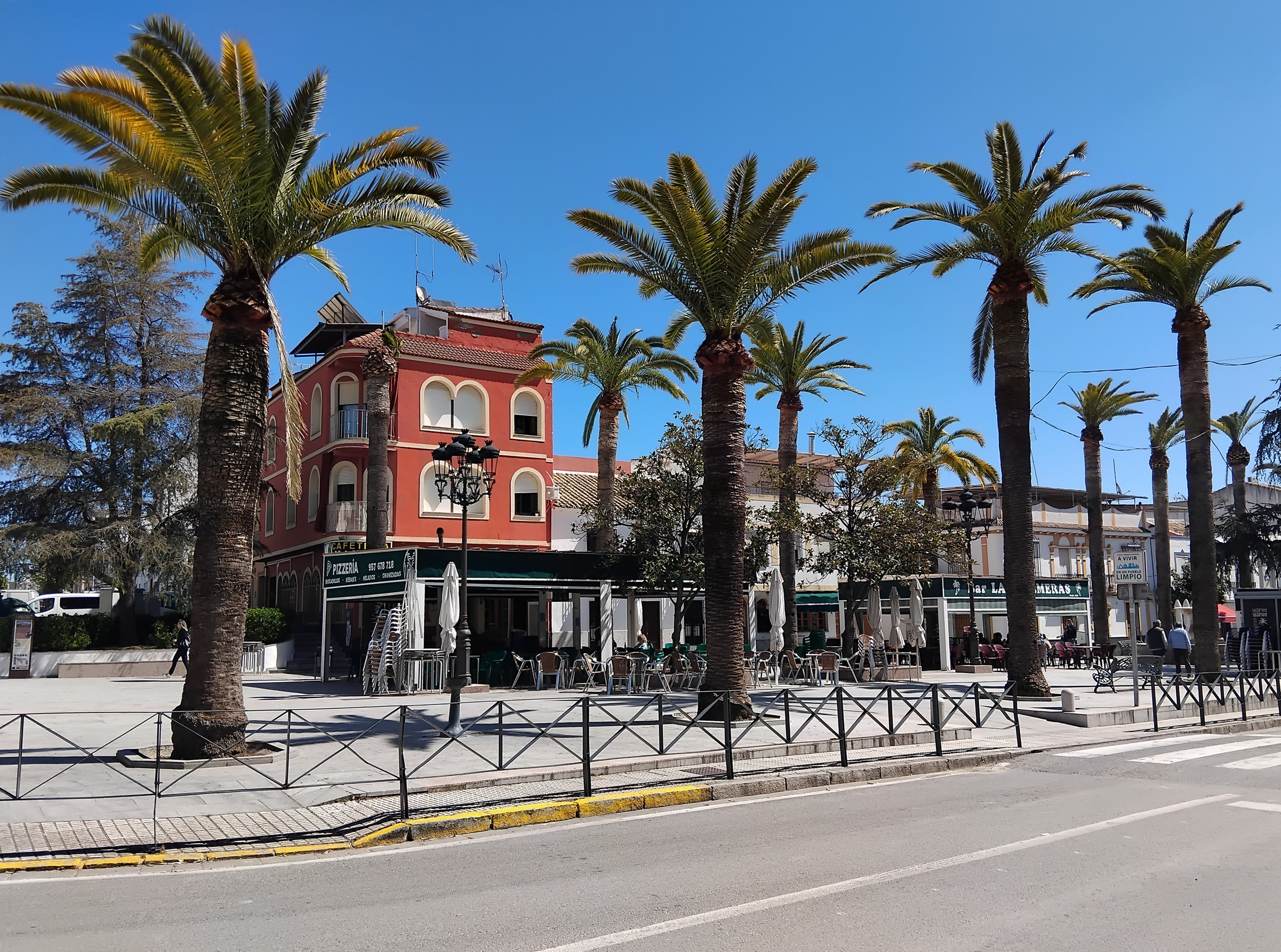

- Flag Seal
- Interactive map of Nueva Carteya
- Coordinates: 37°35′N 4°28′W
- Country: Spain
- Province: Córdoba
- Municipality: Nueva Carteya

Area
  - Total: 70 km^{2} (27 sq mi)
- Elevation: 454 m (1,490 ft)

Population (2006)
  - Total: 5,566
  - Density: 79.5/km^{2} (206/sq mi)
- Time zone: UTC+1 (CET)
  - Summer (DST): UTC+2 (CEST)
- Website: www.nuevacarteya.es

Nueva Carteya is a municipality located in the province of Córdoba, Spain. According to the 2006 census (INE), the city has a population of 5566 inhabitants.

== See also ==
- List of municipalities in Córdoba
