= Comarcas of Andalusia =

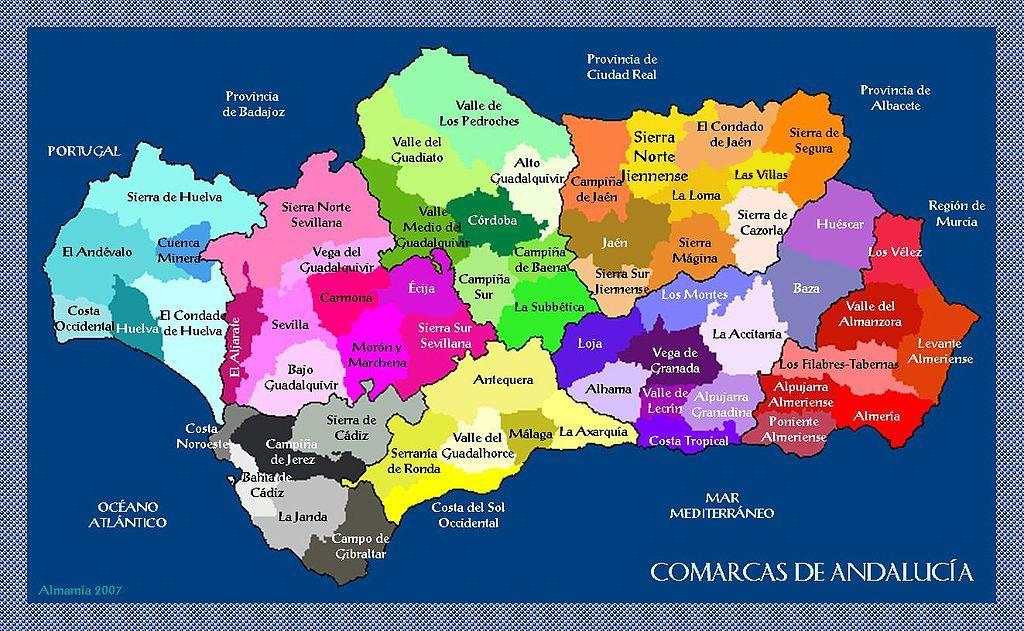
Comarcas of Andalusia

In Andalusia, comarcas have no defined administrative powers; many municipalities have gathered together to form mancomunidades in order to provide basic services, but those do not always coincide with the traditional comarcas. The current (2007) Statute of Autonomy of Andalusia, unlike its 1981 predecessor, allows for the establishment and regulation of official comarcas under its Title III, Article 97, which defines the significance of comarcas and sets the basis for future legislation in this area.

In 2003, the Council of Tourism and Sports of the Regional Government of Andalusia published an order in which it defined the comarca as "a geographic space with some homogeneous natural characteristicas, which produce social relations of immediacy and closeness, and present some common natural, economic and social characteristics and some common interests". This defined the official comarcas of Andalusia in the number of 62, as the following ones:

Comarca	Municipalities	Area (km^{2})	Population (2009)	Density (inhabitants/km^{2})	Main city	Province
La Accitania	26	1,691	42,791	25.25	Guadix	Granada
Alhama	6	976	17,972	18	Alhama de Granada	Granada
El Aljarafe	30	1,136	338,532	290	Mairena del Aljarafe	Seville
Alpujarra Almeriense	22	818	15,657	19.14	Alhama de Almería	Almería
Alpujarra Granadina	25	1.143	24,558	21.49	Órgiva	Granada
Alto Guadalquivir	8	1,299	44,931	34.6	Montoro	Córdoba
Andévalo	14	2,510	38,873	15.45	Valverde del Camino	Huelva
Antequera	6	1,072	65,368	53.98	Antequera	Málaga
La Axarquía	31	1,025	202,325	197.39	Vélez-Málaga	Málaga
Bay of Cádiz	5	607	425,462	700.93	Cádiz	Cádiz
Bajo Guadalquivir	8	1,561	147,183	137.65	Utrera	Seville
Baza	8	1,715.4	43,015	25.08	Baza	Granada
Campiña de Baena	5	725	39,670	54.8	Baena	Córdoba
Campiña de Carmona	4	1,138	68,688	60.36	Carmona	Seville
Campiña de Jaén	10	1,741.76	67,904	38.9	Andújar	Jaén
Campiña de Jerez	2	1,412	209,960	148.51	Jerez de la Frontera	Cádiz
Campiña de Morón y Marchena	7	1,481	92,643	62.55	Morón de la Frontera	Seville
Campiña Sur Cordobesa	11	1,101.8	106,489	96.7	Puente Genil	Córdoba
Campo de Gibraltar	7	1,528.6	263,739	172.5	Algeciras	Cádiz
Condado de Huelva	14	2,457	100,294	40.8	La Palma del Condado	Huelva
Condado de Jaén	7	1,488.11	23,690	16.1	Navas de San Juan	Jaén
Córdoba	1	1,252	322,867	257.88	Córdoba	Córdoba
Costa del Sol Occidental	9	802	492,965	614.66	Marbella	Málaga
Costa Noroeste de Cádiz	4	360	119,870	332.97	Sanlúcar de Barrameda	Cádiz
Costa Occidental de Huelva	6	694	88,989	128	Lepe	Huelva
Costa Tropical	17	786.88	127,010	161.41	Motril	Granada
Cuenca Minera	6	628	17,511	27.88	Nerva	Huelva
Écija	5	1,238.36	60,728	49.04	Écija	Seville
Filabres-Tabernas	18	1,466	14,609	9.97	Tabernas	Almería
Guadalteba	8	762	25,931	33.89	Campillos	Málaga
Huéscar	6	1,814.28	17,479	9.63	Huéscar	Granada
Jaén	16	1,755.56	227,029	158.14	Jaén	Jaén
La Janda	7	1,537	86,485	56.27	Medina-Sidonia	Cádiz
Levante Almeriense	13	1,586	82,321	51.90	Huércal-Overa	Almería
Loja	10	1305	55,207	48.25	Loja	Granada
La Loma	10	1,037.4	79,371	76.5	Úbeda	Jaén
Málaga-Costa del Sol	1	395	568,305	1,438.75	Málaga	Málaga
Comarca Metropolitana de Almería	9	1,159	239,132	206.33	Almería	Almería
Comarca Metropolitana de Huelva	7	848	230,393	272	Huelva	Huelva
Comarca Metropolitana de Sevilla	22	1,489	1,161,706	780.19	Seville	Seville
Los Montes	18	1,400	26,420	19.32	Iznalloz	Granada
Nororma	7	436	29,790	68.33	Archidona	Málaga
Los Pedroches	17	3,612	56,512	15.6	Pozoblanco	Córdoba
Poniente Almeriense	9	971	218,426	224.95	El Ejido	Almería
Serranía de Ronda	21	1,256	55,838	44.45	Ronda	Málaga
Sierra de Cádiz	19	1,949	113,738	57.76	Villamartin	Cádiz
Sierra de Cazorla	9	1,330,72	34,138	25.5	Cazorla	Jaén
Sierra de Huelva	29	3,046	39,541	12.98	Aracena	Huelva
Sierra Mágina	14	1,389.4	42,172	30.5	Jódar	Jaén
Sierra de las Nieves	9	682	21,587	31.65	Yunquera	Málaga
Sierra Morena	9	1,396.7	105,848	75.6	Linares	Jaén
Sierra Norte de Sevilla	18	3,779	58,481	15.48	Constantina	Seville
Sierra de Segura	13	1,931	26,549	13.8	Beas de Segura	Jaén
Sierra Sur de Jaén	5	784.27	44,323	56.6	Alcalá la Real	Jaén
Sierra Sur de Sevilla	19	1,585	88,113	55.59	Osuna	Seville
La Subbética	14	1,597	126,802	79.4	Lucena	Córdoba
Valle del Almanzora	27	1,631	53,138	32.58	Albox	Almería
Valle del Guadalhorce	8	804	130,932	162.85	Coín	Málaga
Valle del Guadiato	11	2,493	31,907	12.8	Peñarroya-Pueblonuevo	Córdoba
Valle de Lecrín	8	460	22,497	48.90	Dúrcal	Granada
Valle Medio del Guadalquivir	8	1,691	69,353	41.01	Peñarroya-Pueblonuevo	Córdoba
Vega de Granada	40	1.363,22	500,121	366.86	Granada	Granada
Vega del Guadalquivir	11	908	96,637	106.43	Lora del Río	Seville
Los Vélez	4	1,145	12,567	10.98	Vélez Rubio	Almería
Las Villas	4	556.38	22,091	40	Villacarrillo	Jaén
