= Espiel =

- Municipality
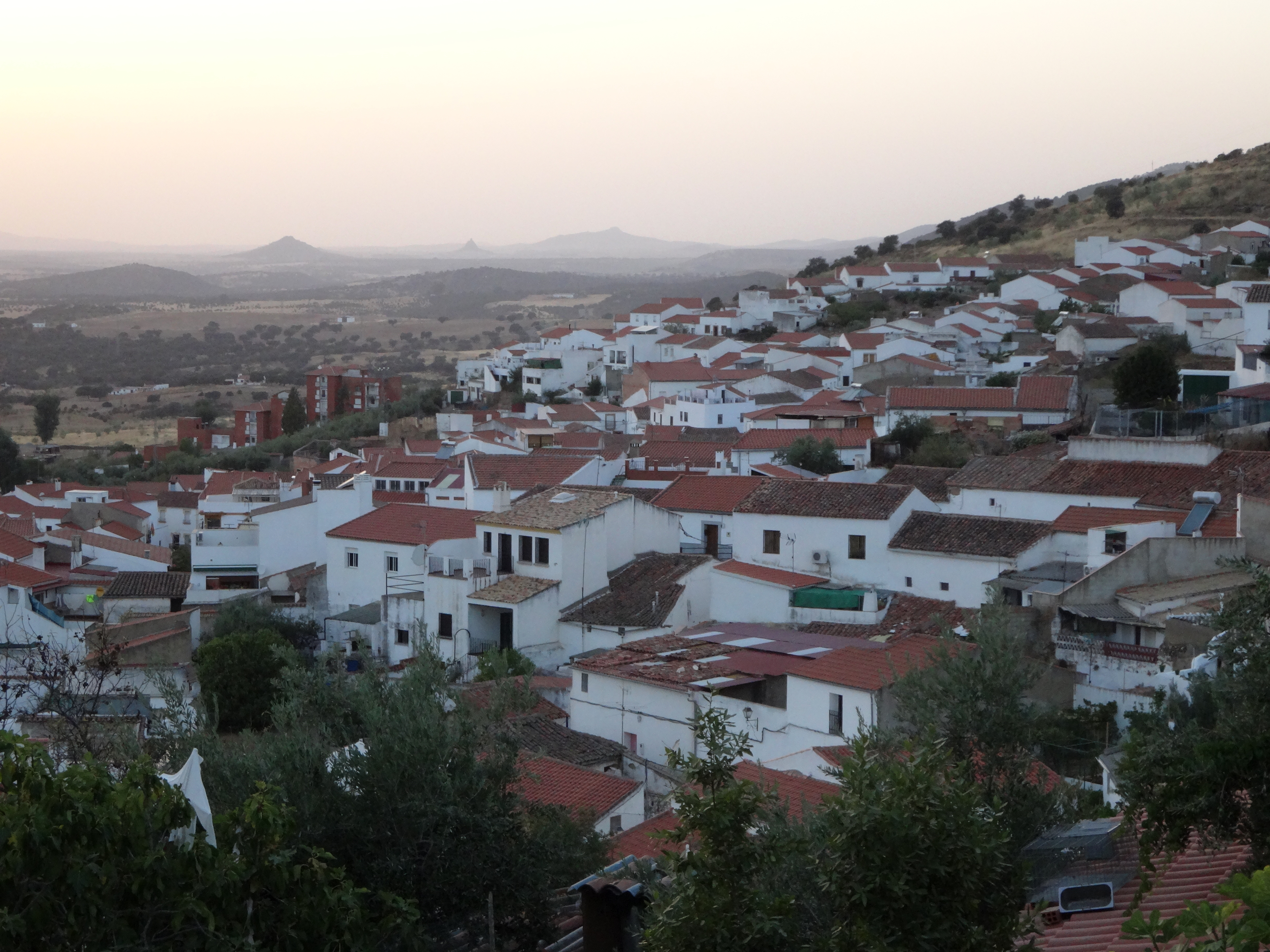

- Seal
- Interactive map of Espiel
- Coordinates: 38°11′16″N 5°1′12″W
- Country: Spain
- Province: Córdoba
- Municipality: Espiel

Area
  - Total: 436 km^{2} (168 sq mi)
- Elevation: 548 m (1,798 ft)

Population (2025-01-01)
  - Total: 2,326
  - Density: 5.33/km^{2} (13.8/sq mi)
- Time zone: UTC+1 (CET)
  - Summer (DST): UTC+2 (CEST)

Espiel is a city located in the province of Córdoba, Spain. According to the 2006 census (INE), the city has a population of 2422 inhabitants.

== See also ==
- List of municipalities in Córdoba
