= Villanueva del Rey =

- Municipality
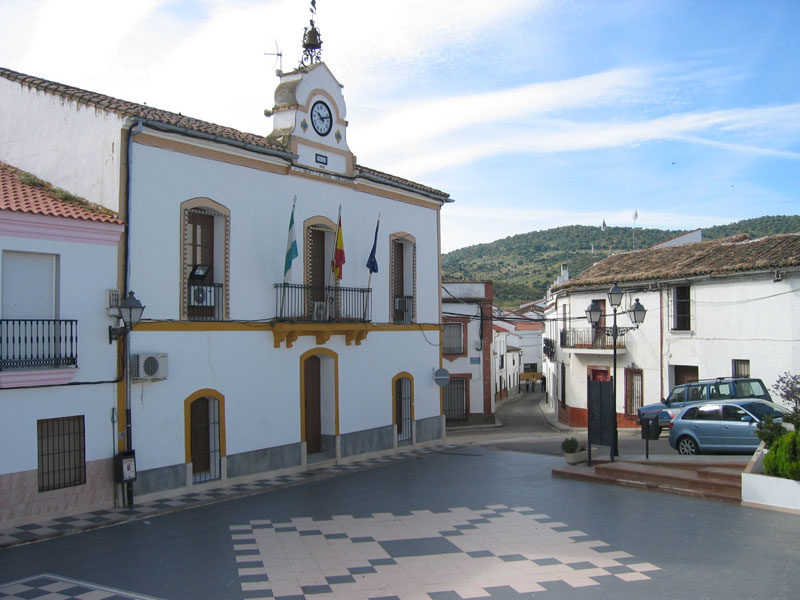
- Villanueva del Rey Town Hall
- Interactive map of Villanueva del Rey
- Coordinates: 38°12′N 5°09′W
- Country: Spain
- Province: Córdoba
- Municipality: Villanueva del Rey

Government
  - Mayor: Andrés Morales Vázquez

Area
  - Total: 215 km^{2} (83 sq mi)
- Elevation: 555 m (1,821 ft)

Population (2025-01-01)
  - Total: 1,031
  - Density: 4.80/km^{2} (12.4/sq mi)
- Time zone: UTC+1 (CET)
  - Summer (DST): UTC+2 (CEST)

Villanueva del Rey is a municipality located in the province of Córdoba, Spain. According to the 2006 census (INE), the city has a population of 1,224 inhabitants.

== See also ==
- List of municipalities in Córdoba
