= Castro del Río =

- Municipality
- Seal

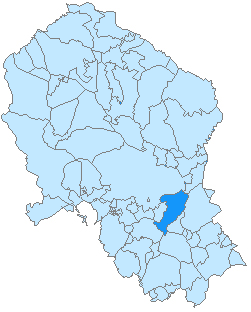
- Coordinates: 37°41′N 4°28′W
- Country: Spain
- Province: Córdoba
- Municipality: Castro del Río

Area
  - Total: 218 km^{2} (84 sq mi)
- Elevation: 227 m (745 ft)

Population (2025-01-01)
  - Total: 7,597
  - Density: 34.8/km^{2} (90.3/sq mi)
- Time zone: UTC+1 (CET)
  - Summer (DST): UTC+2 (CEST)

Castro del Río is a municipality located in the province of Córdoba, Spain. According to the 2006 census (INE), the city has a population of 8,074 inhabitants.

== See also ==
- List of municipalities in Córdoba
