= La Guijarrosa =

- Municipality
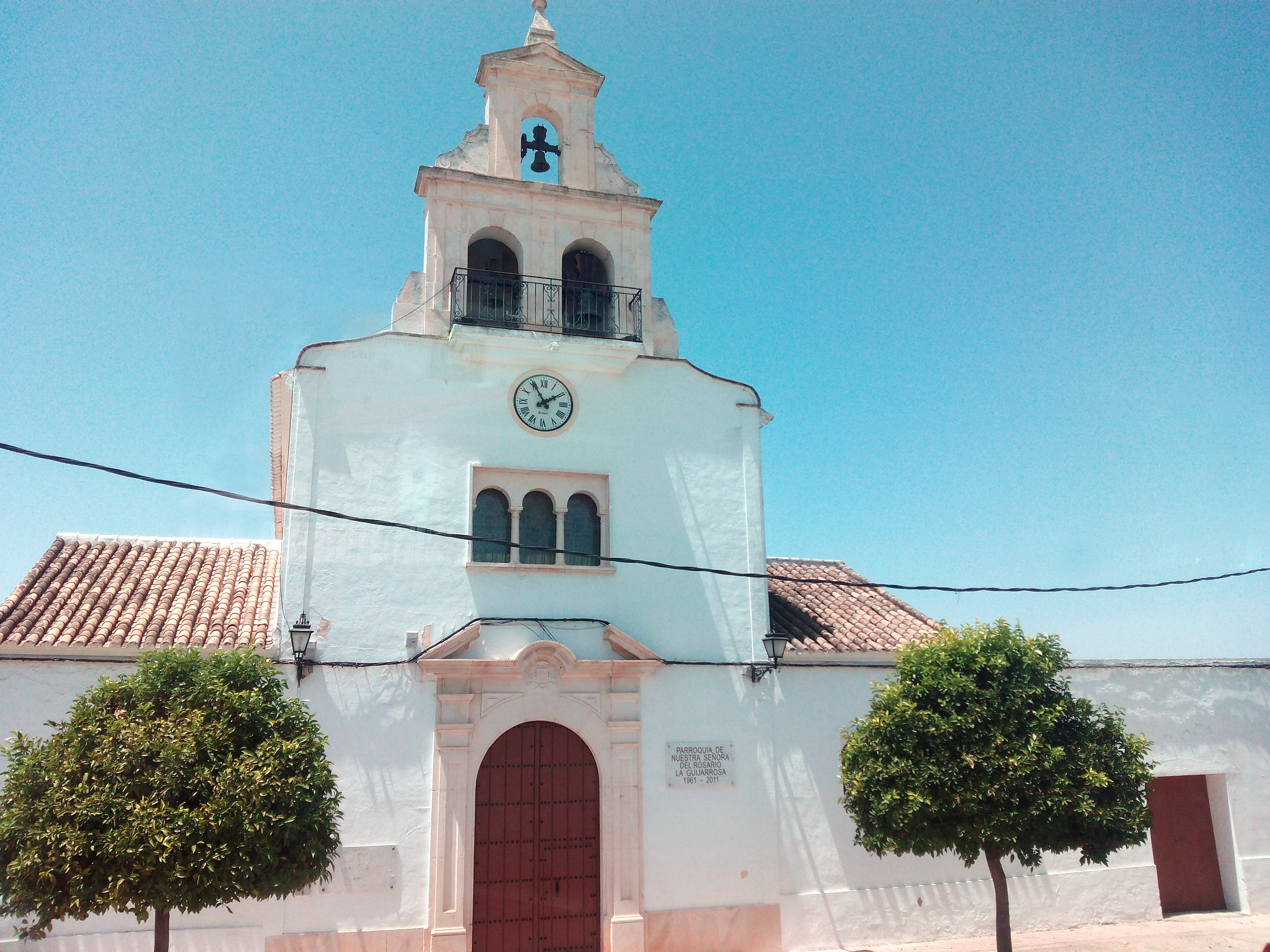

- Flag Coat of arms

- Location in Spain
- Coordinates: 37°38′17″N 4°51′52″W
- Country: Spain
- Autonomous community: Andalusia
- Province: Córdoba
- Comarca: Campiña Sur
- Judicial district: Montilla

Government
  - Alcalde: Manuel Ruiz Alcántara

Area
  - Total: 45.56 km^{2} (17.59 sq mi)
- Elevation: 331.50 m (1,087.6 ft)

Population (2020)
  - Total: 1,379
  - Density: 30.27/km^{2} (78.39/sq mi)
- Time zone: UTC+1 (CET)
  - Summer (DST): UTC+2 (CEST)
- Website: Official website

La Guijarrosa is a municipality located in the Province of Córdoba, in the autonomous community of Andalusia, Spain.

It was an independent local entity within the municipality of Santaella until 2018, when it officially became an independent municipality.
