= Almedinilla =

- Municipality
- Flag Seal

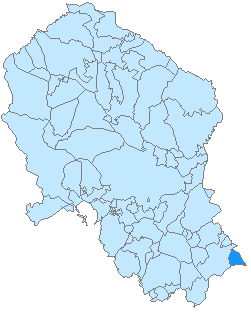
- Coordinates: 37°26′N 4°05′W
- Country: Spain
- Province: Córdoba
- Municipality: Almedinilla

Government
  - Mayor: Antonio Cano Reina

Area
  - Total: 56 km^{2} (22 sq mi)
- Elevation: 622 m (2,041 ft)

Population (2025-01-01)
  - Total: 2,302
  - Density: 41/km^{2} (110/sq mi)
- Time zone: UTC+1 (CET)
  - Summer (DST): UTC+2 (CEST)

Almedinilla is a municipality located in the province of Córdoba, Spain. According to the 2006 census (INE), the city has a population of 2,536 inhabitants.

== See also ==
- List of municipalities in Córdoba
