= Fuente la Lancha =

Fuente la Lancha, Spain
- city
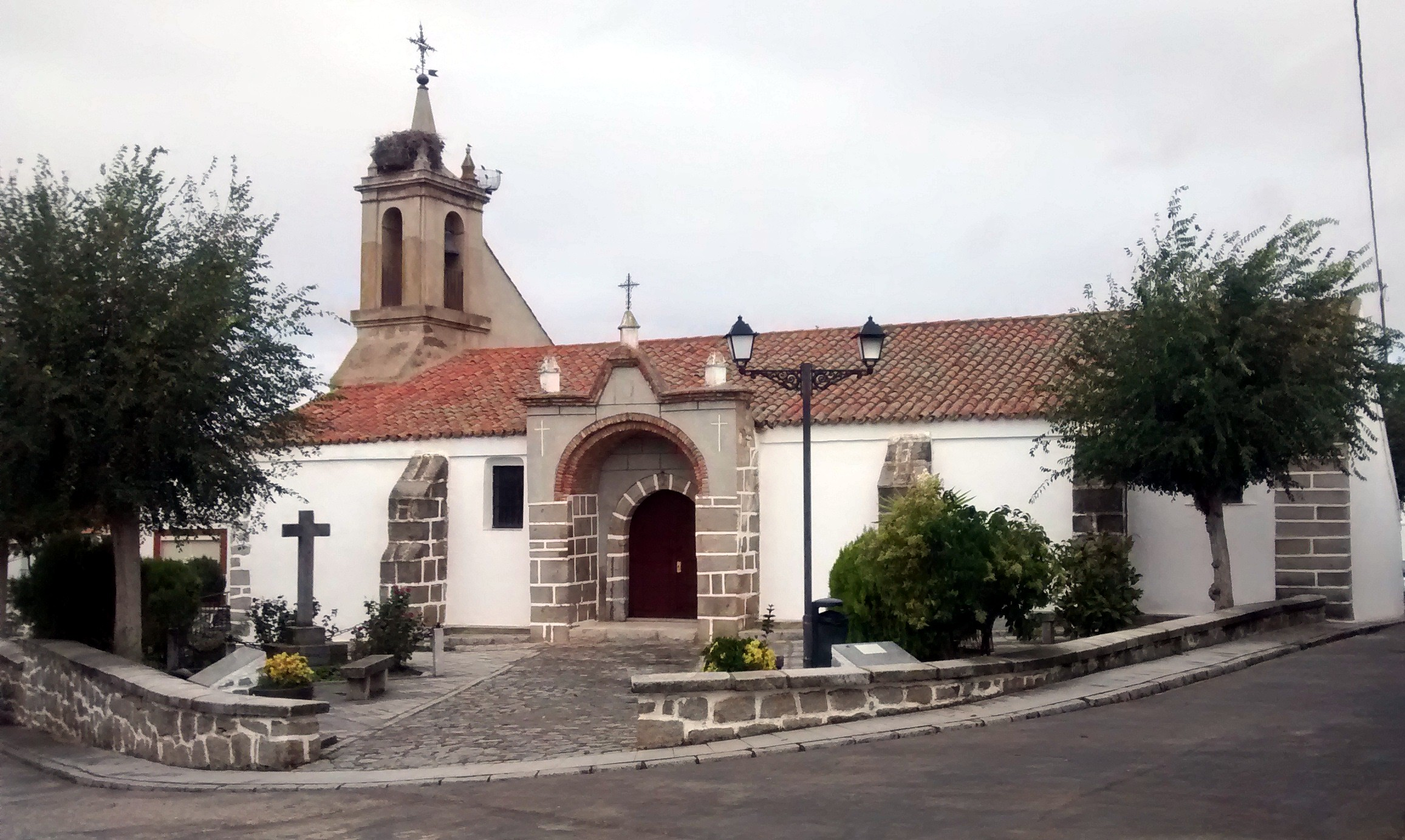
- Parish Church of Santa Catalina in Fuente la Lancha

- Seal
- Interactive map of Fuente la Lancha, Spain
- Coordinates: 38°25′N 5°25′W
- Country: Spain
- Province: Córdoba
- Municipality: Fuente la Lancha

Area
  - Total: 7 km^{2} (2.7 sq mi)
- Elevation: 556 m (1,824 ft)

Population (2025-01-01)
  - Total: 330
  - Density: 47/km^{2} (120/sq mi)
- Time zone: UTC+1 (CET)
  - Summer (DST): UTC+2 (CEST)

Fuente la Lancha is a city located in the province of Córdoba, Spain. According to the 2006 census (INE), the city has a population of 415 inhabitants.

== See also ==
- List of municipalities in Córdoba
