= El Guijo =

- city
- Flag Seal
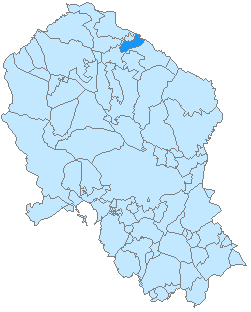
- Coordinates: 38°30′N 4°47′W
- Country: Spain
- Province: Córdoba
- Municipality: El Guijo

Area
  - Total: 67 km^{2} (26 sq mi)
- Elevation: 567 m (1,860 ft)

Population (2025-01-01)
  - Total: 342
  - Density: 5.1/km^{2} (13/sq mi)
- Time zone: UTC+1 (CET)
  - Summer (DST): UTC+2 (CEST)

El Guijo is a city located in the province of Córdoba, Spain. According to the 2006 census (INE), the city has a population of 404 inhabitants. It was donated by Fernando III in 1231 and confirmed by Alfonso X as a donation in 1256.

== See also ==
- List of municipalities in Córdoba
