= Espejo, Córdoba =

Coordinates: 37°41′N 4°33′W

Espejo
- Municipality
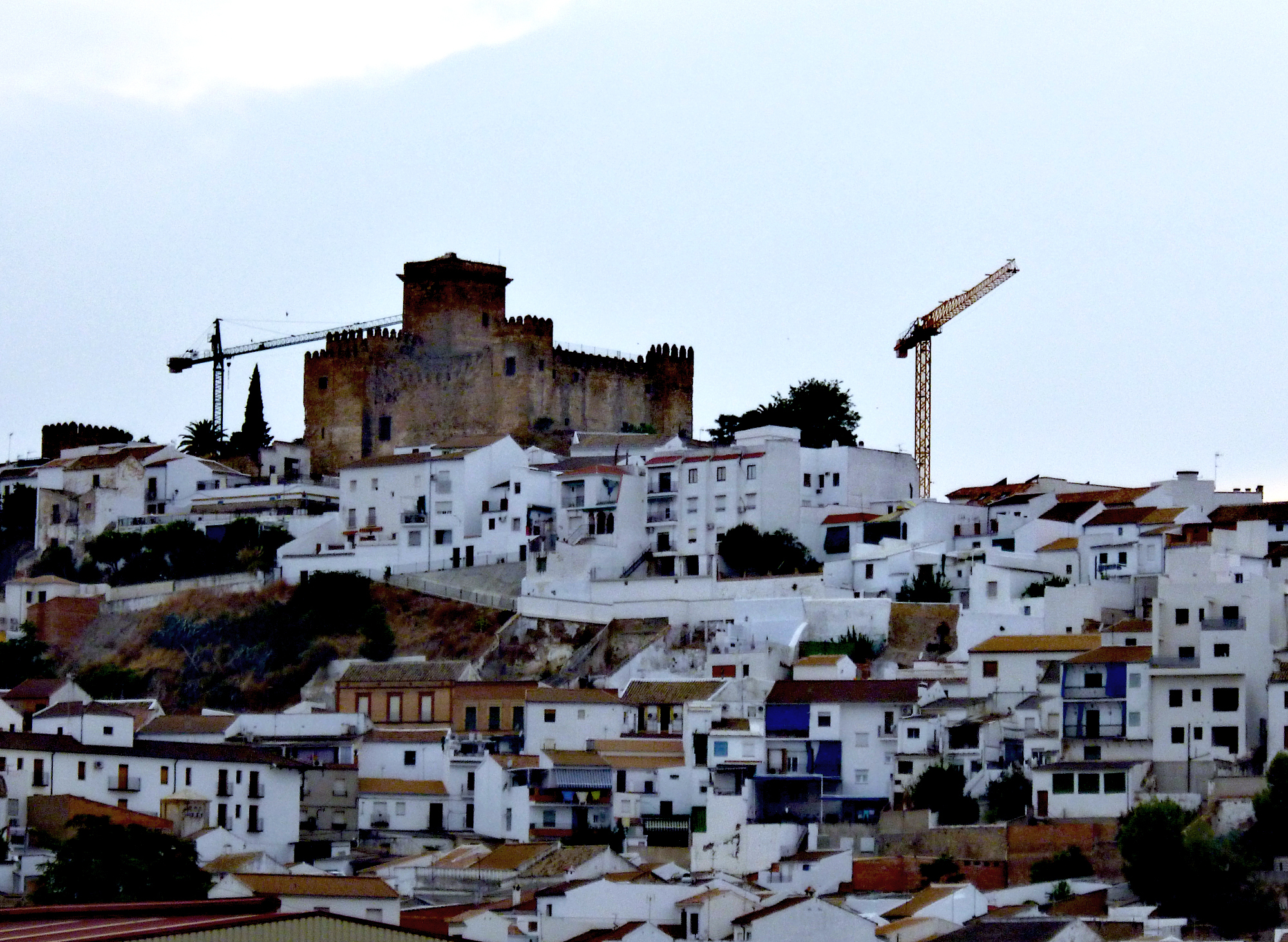
- View of Espejo

- Seal

- Location in Spain.
- Country: Spain
- Autonomous community: Andalusia
- Province: Córdoba

Area
  - Total: 56 km^{2} (22 sq mi)
- Elevation: 423 m (1,388 ft)

Population (2025-01-01)
  - Total: 3,175
  - Density: 57/km^{2} (150/sq mi)
- Time zone: UTC+1 (CET)
  - Summer (DST): UTC+2 (CEST)

Espejo is a municipality in the province of Córdoba, Spain.

== See also ==
- List of municipalities in Córdoba
