= Encinas Reales =

- Municipality
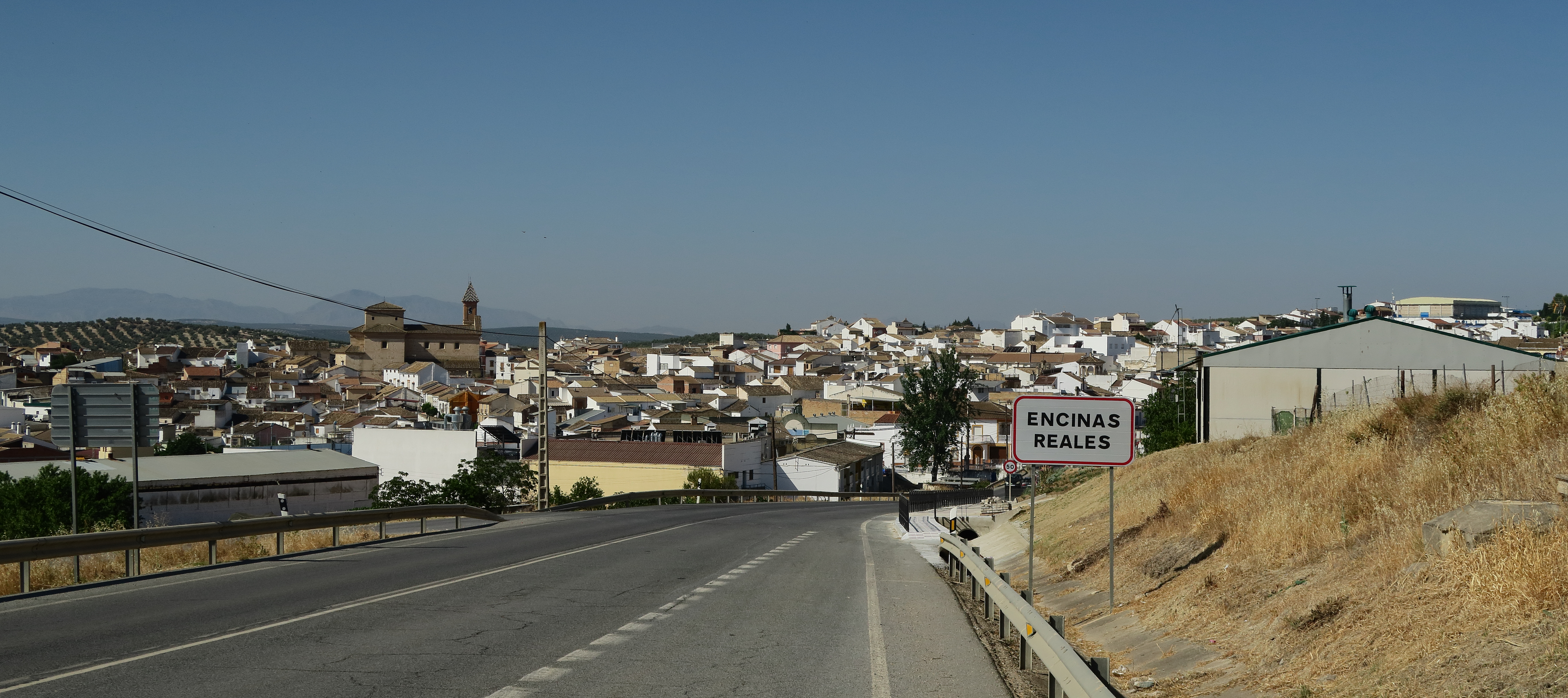
- View of Encinas Reales

- Seal

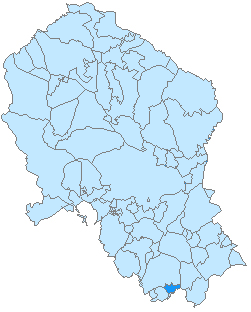

- Location within Spain
- Coordinates: 37°16′0″N 4°29′0″W
- Country: Spain
- Province: Córdoba
- Municipality: Encinas Reales

Government
  - Mayor: Gabriel González Barco (PSOE)

Area
  - Total: 34.21 km^{2} (13.21 sq mi)
- Elevation: 445 m (1,460 ft)

Population (2025-01-01)
  - Total: 2,208
  - Density: 64.54/km^{2} (167.2/sq mi)
- Time zone: UTC+1 (CET)
  - Summer (DST): UTC+2 (CEST)
- ZIP Code: 14913
- Area code: (+34)
- Vehicle registration: CO
- Website: www.encinasreales.es

Encinas Reales is a municipality located in the province of Córdoba, Spain. According to the 2006 census (INE), the city has a population of 2,425 inhabitants.

== Politics ==
In the 2007 municipal election, Spanish Socialist Workers' Party got 658 votes (40.69%, 5 seats in the municipal council), the Andalusian Party got 480 votes (29.68% and 3 seats), People's Party got 317 votes (19.60%, 2 seats ) and the United Left-Greens-Appeal for Andalucia got 149 votes (9.21%, 1 seat).

== See also ==
- List of municipalities in Córdoba
