= Benamejí =

Coordinates: 37°16′N 4°32′W

Benamejí, Spain
- Municipality
- Flag Seal

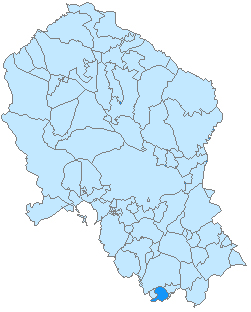
- Country: Spain
- Province: Córdoba
- Municipality: Benamejí

Area
  - Total: 54 km^{2} (21 sq mi)
- Elevation: 497 m (1,631 ft)

Population (2025-01-01)
  - Total: 4,895
  - Density: 91/km^{2} (230/sq mi)
- Time zone: UTC+1 (CET)
  - Summer (DST): UTC+2 (CEST)
- Website: www.benameji.es

Benamejí is a municipality located in the province of Córdoba, Spain. According to the 2006 census (INE), the city has a population of 5072 inhabitants.

== See also ==
- List of municipalities in Córdoba
