= Fuente-Tójar =

Fuente Tójar
- Municipality
- Seal

- Location within Spain
- Coordinates: 37°30′N 4°08′W
- Country: Spain
- Province: Córdoba
- Municipality: Fuente-Tójar

Area
  - Total: 24 km^{2} (9.3 sq mi)
- Elevation: 600 m (2,000 ft)

Population (2025-01-01)
  - Total: 666
  - Density: 28/km^{2} (72/sq mi)
- Time zone: UTC+1 (CET)
  - Summer (DST): UTC+2 (CEST)

Fuente-Tójar is a municipality located in the province of Córdoba, Spain. According to the 2006 census (INE), the city has a population of 795 inhabitants. It has its own municipal government which is separate from the nearest town of Priego De Cordoba, unlike the surrounding villages of the municipality

== See also ==
- List of municipalities in Córdoba
