= Valle Medio del Guadalquivir =

- Comarca
- Coordinates: 37°44′40″N 5°3′39″W
- Country: Spain
- Autonomous community: Andalusia
- Province: Córdoba

Area
  - Total: 1,691 km^{2} (653 sq mi)

Population (2009)
  - Total: 69,353
  - Density: 41.01/km^{2} (106.2/sq mi)

Valle Medio del Guadalquivir is a comarca in the province of Córdoba, Spain. It is occasionally referred to as "Vega del Guadalquivir", hence it is often confused with the comarca by the same name in Seville. It contains the following municipalities:

- Almodóvar del Río
- Fuente Palmera
- Guadalcázar
- Hornachuelos
- La Carlota
- La Victoria
- Palma del Río
- Posadas
