= Guadalcázar (Córdoba) =

- Municipality
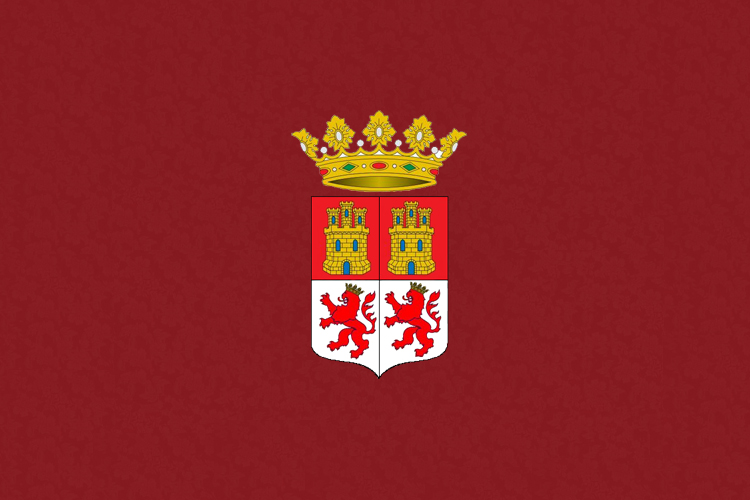
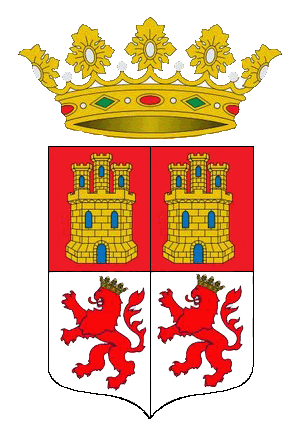
- Flag Seal

- Location in Spain. Guadalcázar (Andalusia) Guadalcázar (Spain)
- Coordinates: 37°45′N 4°56′W
- Country: Spain
- Autonomous community: Andalusia
- Province: Córdoba
- Comarca: Vega del Guadalquivir

Government
  - Mayor: Francisco Estepa Lendínez

Area
  - Total: 72 km^{2} (28 sq mi)
- Elevation: 158 m (518 ft)

Population (2025-01-01)
  - Total: 1,589
  - Density: 22/km^{2} (57/sq mi)
- Demonym: Guadalcaceños
- Time zone: UTC+1 (CET)
  - Summer (DST): UTC+2 (CEST)

Guadalcázar is a municipality located in the province of Córdoba, southern Spain.

== See also ==
- List of municipalities in Córdoba
