= La Rambla, Córdoba =

La Rambla
- city
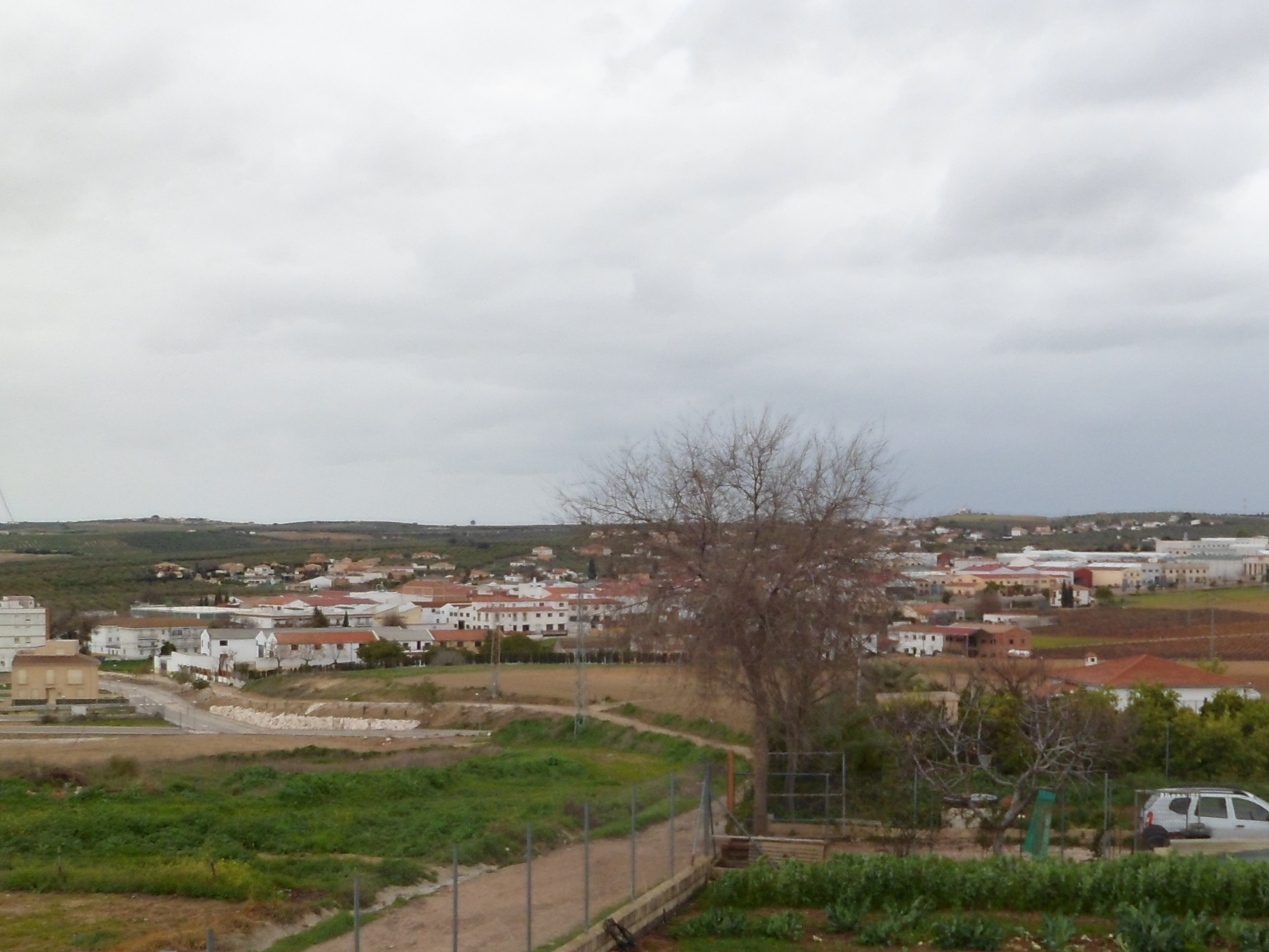
- View of La Rambla, Córdoba

- Seal

- Location of La Rambla in Spain
- Coordinates: 37°36′N 4°44′W
- Country: Spain
- Autonomous community: Andalusia
- Province: Córdoba

Area
  - Total: 138 km^{2} (53 sq mi)
- Elevation: 358 m (1,175 ft)

Population (2025-01-01)
  - Total: 7,412
  - Density: 53.7/km^{2} (139/sq mi)
- Time zone: UTC+1 (CET)
  - Summer (DST): UTC+2 (CEST)
- Website: www.larambla.es

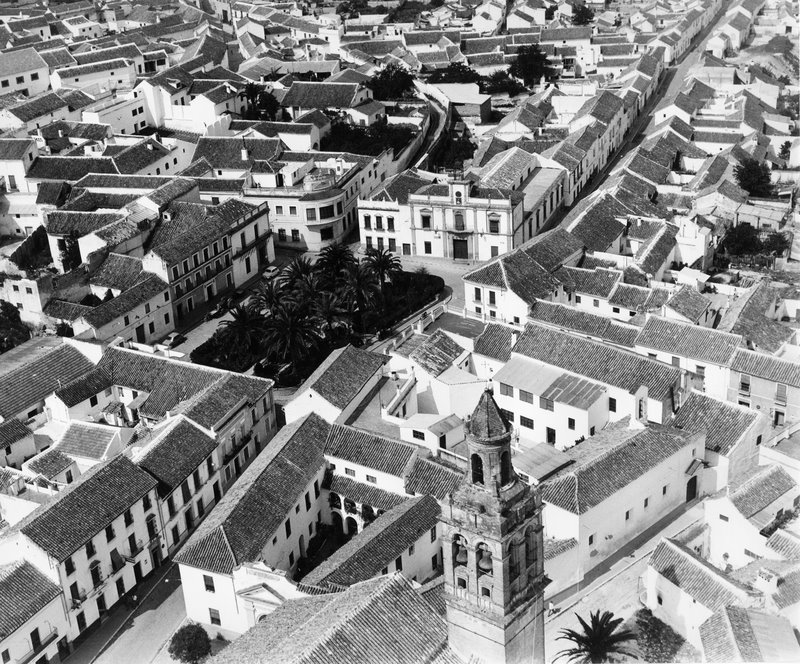
Aerial view of La Rambla in 1986

La Rambla is a municipality in the province of Córdoba, Spain.

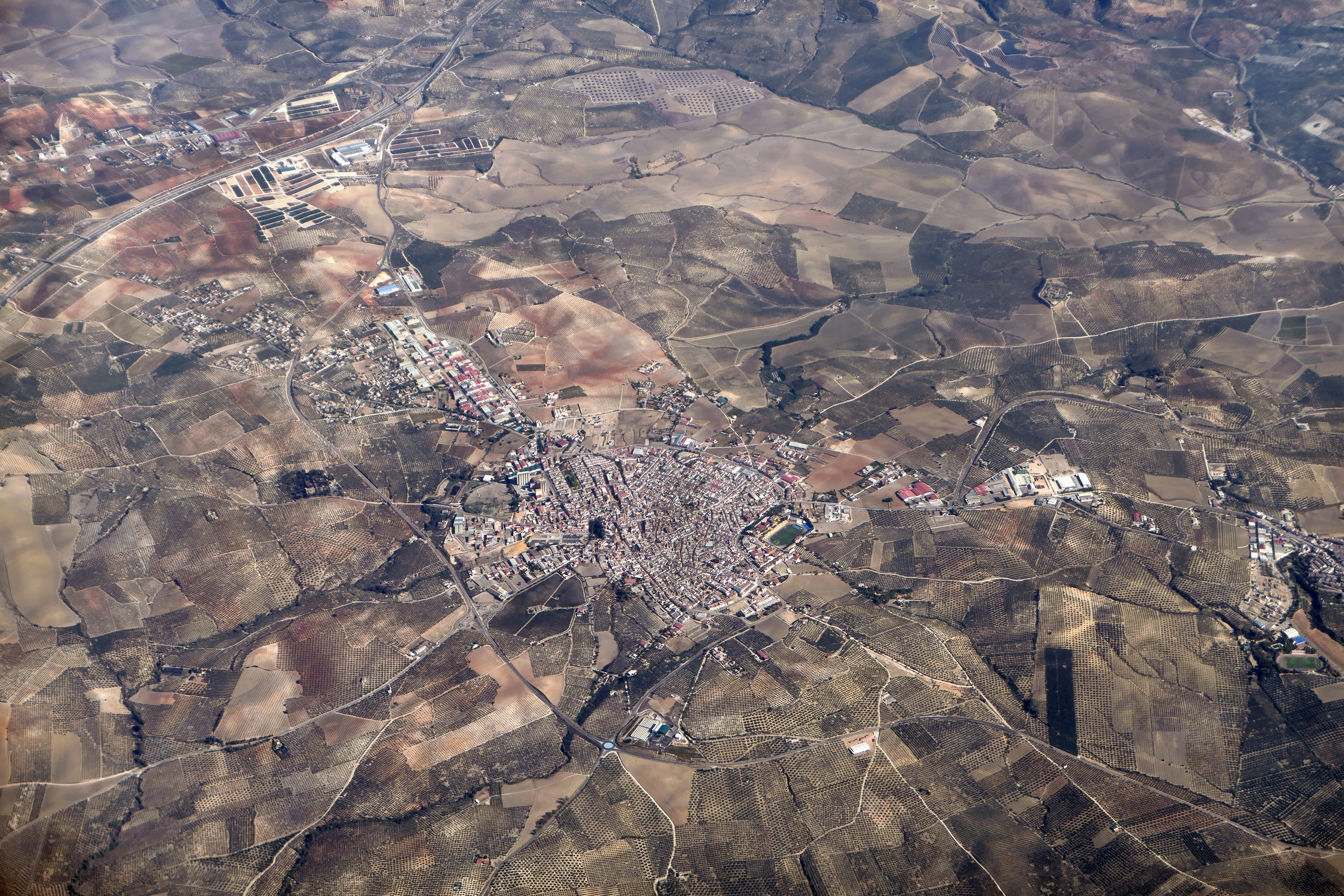
Aerial view of the town in 2022.

== Climate ==
La Rambla has a hot summer mediterranean climate with very hot, dry summers and mild to cool wet winters. Due to its location in the Guadalquivir valley, summers are some of the hottest in Europe, with average mean maximum temperature exceeding 37 °C (99 °F), despite having relatively cool nightly temperatures.

The lowest temperature ever recorded was −6.4 °C (20 °F) on 10 February 2012 and 13 February 2012. On August 14, 2021 La Rambla recorded 47.6 °C (118 °F), setting a new nationwide record for the highest temperature in Spain and the highest ever recorded in Continental Europe during the 21st century.

Climate data for La Rambla (2009-2025), extremes (2008-present)
Month	Jan	Feb	Mar	Apr	May	Jun	Jul	Aug	Sep	Oct	Nov	Dec	Year
Record high °C (°F)	24.8 (76.6)	26.0 (78.8)	31.8 (89.2)	37.9 (100.2)	38.8 (101.8)	42.8 (109.0)	46.8 (116.2)	47.6 (117.7)	44.9 (112.8)	37.2 (99.0)	29.3 (84.7)	23.3 (73.9)	47.6 (117.7)
Mean daily maximum °C (°F)	14.9 (58.8)	17.0 (62.6)	19.6 (67.3)	23.0 (73.4)	28.2 (82.8)	33.2 (91.8)	37.5 (99.5)	37.6 (99.7)	31.9 (89.4)	26.9 (80.4)	19.5 (67.1)	16.0 (60.8)	25.4 (77.8)
Daily mean °C (°F)	9.4 (48.9)	10.8 (51.4)	12.9 (55.2)	15.9 (60.6)	19.8 (67.6)	24.1 (75.4)	27.7 (81.9)	28.4 (83.1)	24.1 (75.4)	19.9 (67.8)	13.7 (56.7)	10.6 (51.1)	18.1 (64.6)
Mean daily minimum °C (°F)	3.9 (39.0)	4.6 (40.3)	6.2 (43.2)	8.7 (47.7)	11.4 (52.5)	15.0 (59.0)	17.9 (64.2)	19.1 (66.4)	16.3 (61.3)	13.0 (55.4)	8.0 (46.4)	5.1 (41.2)	10.8 (51.4)
Record low °C (°F)	−4.8 (23.4)	−6.4 (20.5)	−4.4 (24.1)	0.9 (33.6)	2.3 (36.1)	8.3 (46.9)	10.7 (51.3)	12.5 (54.5)	8.7 (47.7)	1.1 (34.0)	−1.4 (29.5)	−3.2 (26.2)	−6.4 (20.5)
Average precipitation mm (inches)	51.7 (2.04)	56.3 (2.22)	87.7 (3.45)	53.1 (2.09)	23.1 (0.91)	5.8 (0.23)	0.4 (0.02)	5.0 (0.20)	23.8 (0.94)	61.2 (2.41)	71.9 (2.83)	69.8 (2.75)	509.8 (20.09)
Source: Agencia Estatal de Meteorología (AEMET OpenData)

== Notable people ==
- Alfonso Cabello, a Paralympic cyclist, was born here in 1993.
- Alejandro Lerroux (4 March 1864 – Madrid, 25 June 1949), a Spanish politician who was the leader of the Radical Republican Party during the Second Spanish Republic.

== See also ==
- List of municipalities in Córdoba
