= Posadas, Spain =

Posadas
- Municipality
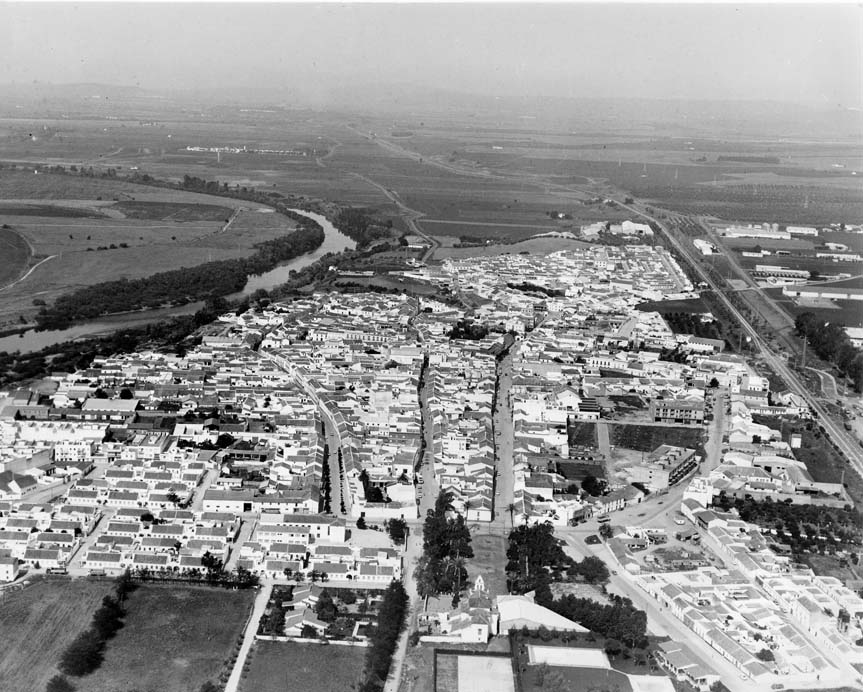
- View of Posadas

- Flag Seal

- Location of Posadas in Spain
- Coordinates: 37°48′N 5°07′W
- Country: Spain
- Autonomous community: Andalusia
- Province: Córdoba

Area
  - Total: 160 km^{2} (62 sq mi)
- Elevation: 88 m (289 ft)

Population (2025-01-01)
  - Total: 7,273
  - Density: 45/km^{2} (120/sq mi)
- Time zone: UTC+1 (CET)
  - Summer (DST): UTC+2 (CEST)
- Postal code: 14730
- Website: www.posadas.es

Posadas is a municipality in the Province of Córdoba, Spain.
