= Baetic Depression =

Alluvial plain in southern Spain

Coordinates: 37°15′N 6°10′W

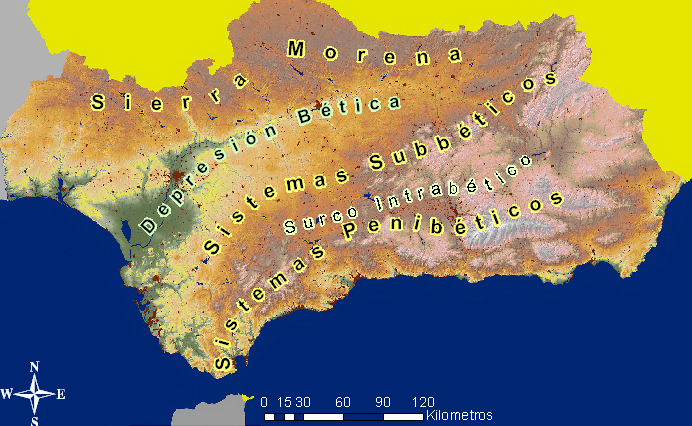
The major topographic features of Andalusia.

The Baetic Depression (Spanish: Depresión Bética / Depresión del Guadalquivir) is an alluvial plain in the lower valley of the Guadalquivir in Andalusia, Spain.

It is a large triangular-shaped area in the Guadalquivir basin oriented roughly northeast to southwest with its vertex in the east-northeast and its outlet in the Gulf of Cádiz.

The Baetic Depression in the Guadalquivir basin is mostly flat land and divides the Sierra Morena to the north from the Baetic System to the south. It is a typical lateral depression of the type that forms amidst Alpine mountain ranges, similar to the valley of the Ebro, the Po River valley in Italy or the Upper Thracian Plain in Bulgaria.

== See also ==
- Baetic System
- Geography of Spain
