= Province of Córdoba (Spain) =

Province of Spain

Province of Córdoba Provincia de Córdoba (Spanish)
- Province
- Flag Coat of arms

- Location of the Province of Córdoba in Spain
- Coordinates: 38°00′N 4°50′W
- Country: Spain
- Autonomous community: Andalusia
- Capital: Córdoba
- Municipalities: 77

Government
  - President: Antonio Ruiz Cruz (PSOE)

Area
  - Total: 13,772.22 km^{2} (5,317.48 sq mi)
  - Rank: 13th in Spain
- 2.7% of Spain

Population (2025)
  - Total: 773,163
  - Rank: 20th in Spain
  - Density: 56.1393/km^{2} (145.400/sq mi)
- 1.6% of Spain
- Demonym(s): English: Cordovan; Spanish: Cordobés
- Official language(s): Spanish
- Parliament: Cortes Generales
- Website: dipucordoba.es

The Province of Córdoba (Spanish: Provincia de Córdoba, [ˈkoɾðoβa]; also called Cordova in English) is a province of Spain, in the north-central part of the autonomous community of Andalusia. It is bordered by the Andalusian provinces of Málaga, Seville, Jaén, and Granada, the Extremaduran province of Badajoz and the province of Ciudad Real, which is part of the autonomous community of Castile-La Mancha.

It has a population of 773,163 in an area of 13,772.22 square kilometres (5,317.48 sq mi) across its 77 municipalities.

== History ==
A royal decree of 30 November 1833, created the Province of Córdoba (along with 48 other provinces), which was formed by joining the towns of the Kingdom of Córdoba and the following towns until then located in Badajoz: Belalcázar, Fuente la Lancha, Hinojosa del Duque, and Villanueva del Duque.

== Geography ==
The province is mainly divided into three geographical areas: the Sierra Morena to the north, the Baetic Depression in the center and La Campiña in the south. The climate is continental Mediterranean with temperatures in the capital ranging from 9.2 °C in January and 27.2 °C in July and August, which often exceed 40 °C. Rainfall in the capital is recorded from 600 to 750 mm per year. It is concentrated from October to April. The Province of Córdoba ranks 11th in Spain in which the entire population is concentrated in the capital. On average, 31.96% of a Spanish province's population inhabits its capital. The province consists of 75 municipalities. They are further grouped into 8 "comarcas".

Its population is 799,402 (2014), of whom more than 40% live in the capital, Córdoba, and its population density is 58.06/km^{2}. The Province of Córdoba contains 75 municipalities. The province has three natural parks: Sierra de Cardeña y Montoro Natural Park, Sierra de Hornachuelos Natural Park, and Sierras Subbéticas Natural Park. The University of Córdoba was founded in 1972.

The province's capital city is a well-known tourist destination. The Mezquita of Cordoba was built using pillars of uneven heights. The city was declared a world heritage site in 1984.

== Comarcas ==
- Alto Guadalquivir
- Campiña de Baena
- Campiña Sur
- Subbética
- Valle de los Pedroches
- Valle del Guadiato
- Valle Medio del Guadalquivir

== Demographics ==
As of 2025, the population is 773,163, of which 48.9% are male, and 51.1% are female. Minors make up 16.3% of the population, and seniors make up 21.6%.

Historical population

Year	Pop.	±%
1842	306,760	—
1857	351,536	+14.6%
1877	379,218	+7.9%
1887	413,883	+9.1%
1900	446,248	+7.8%
1910	486,958	+9.1%
1920	554,433	+13.9%
1930	667,274	+20.4%
1940	761,244	+14.1%

Year	Pop.	±%
1950	790,242	+3.8%
1960	803,507	+1.7%
1970	731,317	−9.0%
1981	720,823	−1.4%
1991	754,452	+4.7%
2001	761,657	+1.0%
2011	802,575	+5.4%
2021	777,622	−3.1%

Source: INE

=== Immigration ===
As of 2025, immigrants make up 5.4% of the population. The 5 largest foreign countries of birth are Morocco, Colombia, Romania, Venezuela, and Honduras.

== See also ==
- List of municipalities in Córdoba
- Cordoba Cathedral
