= Miss Grand Valencia =

Provincial pageant in Spain

- Formation: 20 February 2020; 6 years ago
- Founders: Andreina Pérez
- Type: Beauty pageant
- Headquarters: Valencia
- Location: Spain
- Members: Miss Grand Spain
- Official language: Spanish

Miss Grand Valencia is a 2020-established provincial female beauty pageant in Spain that aims to select representatives from the province of Valencia for the Miss Grand Spain national competition.

Since the first competition in the Miss Grand Spain pageant, the highest placement obtained by Valencia representatives was the third runner-up, won in 2018 by Djabu Balde.

== History ==
After Vicente Gonzalez acquired the license for Miss Grand Spain in 2015, he began franchising the provincial competitions to individual organizers, who would name the provincial representatives to compete in the national pageant the following year. In the province of Valencia, the license was granted to Miss y Mr. Ciudad de Valencia organization, which sent appointed candidates to compete from 2016 to 2018. After two years of vacancy, another local organizer, Andreina Pérez, purchased the license in 2020 and subsequently organized the first Miss Grand Valencia competition in February 2021, with 19 contestants from different municipalities participating. Of whom Erika Pereira was named the winner.

Before 2021, Valencia joined the Miss Grand Spain pageant three times with appointed representatives in 2016, 2017, and 2018.

== Editions ==
The following table details Miss Grand Valencia's annual editions since 2022.

Edition	Date	Final venue	Entrants	Winner	Ref.
1st	20 February 2022	Sala Madison Concert Club, Massanassa	17	Erika Pereira	
2nd	18 December 2022	Sala Madison Concert Club, Massanassa	15	Maria Rojas	
3rd	11 February 2024	Sala Madison Concert Club, Massanassa	8	Itziar Martín	
4th	22 February 2025	Apertura de Puertas, Valencia	7	Rocío Campos	

== National competition ==
The following is a list of Valencia representatives who competed at the Miss Grand Spain national pageant.

Year	Representative	Original provincial title	Placement at Miss Grand Spain	Ref.
2016	Lidia González Regolf	Appointed	Unplaced	
2017	María del Mar Rodríguez	Appointed	Unplaced	
2018	Djabu Balde	2nd runner-up Miss Grand Sevilla 2018	3rd runner-up	
2019	Mariam Bustos	Miss Grand Cantabria 2019 finalist	Unplaced	
No national pageant in 2020 due to the COVID-19 pandemic
2022	Erika Pereira	Miss Grand Valencia 2022	Top 10	
2023	Maria Rojas	Miss Grand Valencia 2023	Unplaced	
2024	Itziar Martín	Miss Grand Valencia 2024	Unplaced	
