= Miss Grand Castellón =

Provincial pageant in Spain

- Formation: 19 November 2022; 3 years ago
- Founder: Erivest Velásquez
- Type: Beauty pageant
- Headquarters: Castellón de la Plana
- Location: Spain
- Members: Miss Grand Spain
- Official language: Spanish

Miss Grand Castellón is a Spanish provincial-level female beauty pageant in the Province of Castellón. It was founded in 2022 by a make-up artist Erivest Velásquez to select the province representative for Miss Grand Spain national pageant.

Since the first participation in Miss Grand Spain in 2016, Castellón representatives have not yet won the contest; the highest placement they obtained is the top 10 finalist, won in 2016 by an appointed Clara López.

== History ==
Castellón debuted in the Miss Grand Spain pageant in 2016 by the appointed representative, Clara López, who was placed in the top 15 finalists in the national competition. The first Miss Grand Castellón later happened in 2022 when a make-up artist, Erivest Velásquez, acquired the license and organized the contest on 19 November at the Plaza Mayor de Castellón in Castellón de la Plana where a Venezuela immigrant, Nacary Rey Meneses, was named the winner. Meneses then represented the province in the Miss Grand Spain the following year but was unplaced.

Velásquez also organized the contest for the following two consecutive years.

== Editions ==
The following table details Miss Grand Castellón's annual editions since 2024.

Edition	Date	Final venue	Entrants	Winner	Ref.
1st	19 November 2022	Plaza Mayor de Castellón, Castellón de la Plana	12	Nacary Rey Meneses	
2nd	13 April 2024	Plaza Mayor de Castellón, Castellón de la Plana	8	Alina Farcas	
3rd	28 September 2024	Real Club Náutico de Castellón, Grao de Castellón	10	Isabel Jiménez	

== National competition ==
The following is a list of Castellón representatives who competed at the Miss Grand Spain national pageant.

Year	Representative	Original provincial title	Placement at Miss Grand Spain	Ref.
2016	Clara López	Appointed	Top 10	
No representatives from 2017 to 2022
2023	Nacary Rey Meneses	Miss Grand Castellón 2022	Unplaced	
2024	Alina Farcas	Miss Grand Castellón 2023	Top 15	
2025	Isabel Jiménez	Miss Grand Castellón 2024	Unplaced	
2026	Duanny Rodriguez	Miss Grand Castellón 2025 (Note: Supplemental title at the Miss Grand Cataluña 2025 pageant.)		
