= Miss Grand Huelva =

Provincial pageant in Spain

- Formation: 10 June 2016; 10 years ago
- Founder: Ylenia Ruiz
- Type: Beauty pageant
- Headquarters: Huelva
- Location: Spain
- Members: Miss Grand Spain
- Official language: Spanish

Miss Grand Huelva is a Spanish provincial female beauty pageant, held annually since 2016 to select representatives from the Province of Huelva for the Miss Grand Spain national competition.

Huelva's representatives have never won the main title since the first competition in the Miss Grand Spain pageant in 2016. The highest placement they obtained is the top 10 finalists; won in 2016 and 2019.

== History ==
After Vicente Gonzalez acquired the license of Miss Grand Spain in 2015, he began franchising the provincial competitions to individual organizers, who would name the provincial representatives to compete in the national pageant the following year. In the province of Huelva, the first provincial contest of Miss Grand was organized by a local organizer, Ylenia Ruiz, on 10 June 2016, at the Teatro España, La Palma del Condado, with candidates from 12 municipalities involved. Of whom, a model María Rocío Báñez was named the first Miss Grand Huelva. Báñez later competed at the national pageant Miss Grand Spain 2016 and was placed among the top 10 finalists.

== Editions ==
The following table details Miss Grand Huelva's annual editions since 2016.

Edition	Date	Final venue	Entrants	Winner	Ref.
1st	10 June 2016	Teatro España, La Palma del Condado	12	María Rocío Báñez	
2nd	11 June 2017	Ayuntamiento de Rociana del Condado, Rociana del Condado	20	Bela Peña	
3rd	6 May 2018	Teatro España, La Palma del Condado	17	Raquel Pérez Rodríguez	
4th	31 March 2019	Teatro España, La Palma del Condado	14	Ángela Gil Pinto	
5th	19 September 2020	Manzanilla Municipal Stadium, Manzanilla	18	Luján Monteso	
6th	25 September 2021	Recinto Ferial Villarrasa, Villarrasa	16	Verónica Molins	
7th	20 November 2022	Teatro España, La Palma del Condado	14	Lucía Fábregas	
8th	19 November 2023	Teatro Municipal Horacio Noguera, Isla Cristina	11	Alejandra Domínguez	
9th	16 March 2025	Centro Sociocultura Gadea, Villarrasa	8	Sheilaz Garcia	

== National competition ==
The following is a list of Huelva representatives who competed at the Miss Grand Spain national pageant.

Year	Representative	Original provincial title	Placement at Miss Grand Spain	Ref.
2016	María Rocío Báñez	Miss Grand Huelva 2016	Top 10	
2017	Bela Peña	Miss Grand Huelva 2017	Top 11	
2018	Raquel Pérez Rodríguez	Miss Grand Huelva 2018	Top 15	
2019	Ángela Gil Pinto	Miss Grand Huelva 2019	Top 10	
No national pageant in 2020 due to the COVID-19 pandemic
2021	Luján Monteso	Miss Grand Huelva 2020	Top 13	
2022	Verónica Molins	Miss Grand Huelva 2021	Unplaced	
2023	Lucía Fábregas	Miss Grand Huelva 2022	Unplaced	
2024	Alejandra Domínguez	Miss Grand Huelva 2023	Unplaced	
2025	Sheilaz Garcia	Miss Grand Huelva 2024	Unplaced	
2026	Lucía Rodríguez	1st runner-up Miss Grand Huelva 2024		
