= Miss Grand Spain 2025 =

9th Miss Grand Spain beauty pageant

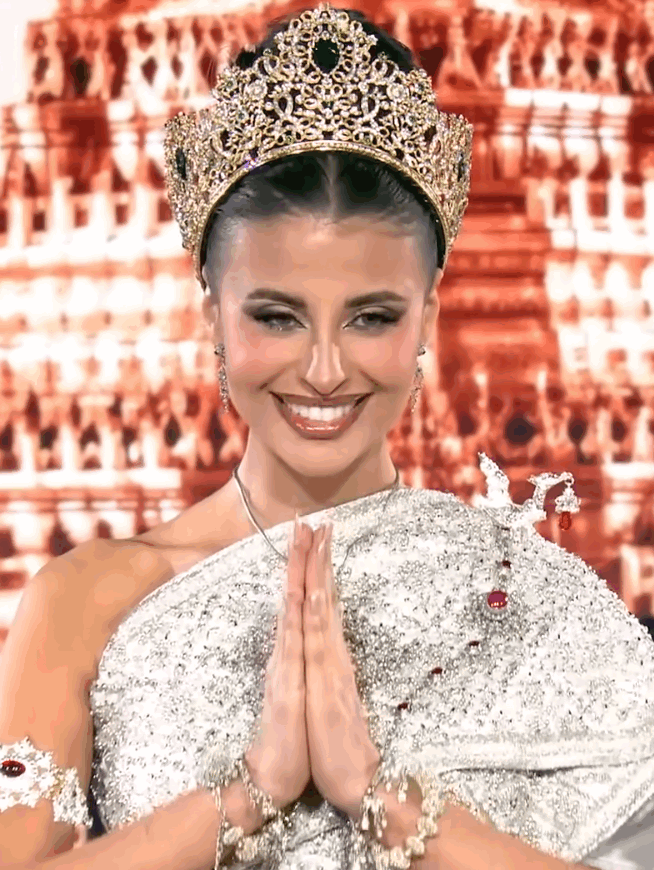
- Aitana Jiménez
- Date: 14 June 2025
- Presenters: Pepe del Real
- Venue: Pabellón Auditorio Miguel Ángel Cerezo Nieto, Adamuz
- Broadcaster: Córdoba TV; YouTube
- Entrants: 36
- Placements: 15
- Debuts: Aragón; Comunidad de Madrid; Costa Brava; Huesca
- Withdrawals: Albacete; Costa Canaria; Extremadura; Zaragoza
- Returns: Asturias
- Winner: Aitana Jiménez (Lleida)
- Congeniality: Cristina Saseta (Comunidad de Madrid)
- Photogenic: Elena Cuesta (Andalucía)

External videos
- Grand Final, YouTube video

Miss Grand Spain 2025 (Spanish: Miss Grand España 2025) was the 9th edition of the Miss Grand Spain pageant, held on 14 June 2025, at the Pabellón Auditorio Miguel Ángel Cerezo Nieto in Adamuz. Thirty-six contestants from 29 provinces and autonomous communities competed for the title. The pageant grand final competition was live-streamed via the organizer's YouTube channel GrandSpain TV and local television channel Córdoba TV, with television personality Pepe del Real as the host.

The contest was won by Aitana Jiménez of Lleida, who was crowned by the outgoing Miss Grand Spain 2024, Susana Medina of Las Palmas. Jiménez later represented the country in the Miss Grand International 2025 pageant. where she was named the 2nd runner-up.

In addition, the pageant organizer announced that next year's national competition will be held in Adamuz, also in the Province of Córdoba.

== Background ==
=== Date and venue ===
On 7 April 2025, it was announced by the organizer that the 2025 Miss Grand Spain pageant was set for 8 to 15 June 2025 in Córdoba, with the preliminary and final competitions at the Teatro de la Axerquia on 13 and 14, respectively. The press conference for the pageant was held on 25 April 2025 at the Córdoba City Hall, with the presence of Blanca Torrent, Deputy Mayor for Economy and Finance, and Isabel Albás, Deputy Mayor for Culture who was also the president of the Instituto Municipal de Artes Escénicas (lit. 'Municipal Institute of Performing Arts'; IMAE).

Initially, the pageant preliminary and grand final rounds were set for Teatro de la Axerquía in Córdoba. Still, the venue was shifted to the Pabellón Auditorio Miguel Ángel Cerezo Nieto in Adamuz for undisclosed reasons.

The pageant's sub-events are shown as follows.

Date	Event	Venue
11 June	Back Night	Mercado Victoria, Córdoba
12 June	Paseo por Córdoba	Streets of Córdoba
13 June	Preliminary Round	Pabellón Auditorio Miguel Ángel Cerezo Nieto, Adamuz
14 June	Grand Final	Pabellón Auditorio Miguel Ángel Cerezo Nieto, Adamuz

=== Selection of contestants ===
The following is a list of the provinces that held the preliminary contests for Miss Grand Spain 2025. The representatives of Girona, Lleida, and Tarragona were appointed to the position without participating in the 2025 provincial pageants.

Pageant	Edition	Date	Final venue	Entrants	Title(s)	Ref.
Miss Grand Alicante	3rd	23 Nov 2024	Auditorio Municipal de Beniarbeig, Alicante	14	(1) Alicante	
Miss Grand Aragon	1st	26 Jan 2025	Auditorio de Cuarte, Cuarte Forum, Zaragoza	15	(2) Aragon and Huesca	
Miss Grand Catalonia	3rd	24 Nov 2024	Sala Aquarella, L'Eixample, Barcelona	8	(2) Barcelona and Costa Brava (Note: The first runner-up Miss Grand Barcelona was later appointed Miss Grand Costa Brava.)	
Miss Grand Cádiz	9th	20 Oct 2024	Teatro Florida, Algeciras, Cádiz	21	(2) Cádiz and Atlántico (Note: The first runner-up Miss Grand Cádiz was later appointed Miss Grand Atlántico.)	
Miss Grand Cantabria	5th	19 Jan 2025	Teatro Vimenor, Piélagos, Cantabria	21	(1) Cantabria	
Miss Grand Castellón	3rd	28 Sep 2024	Real Club Náutico de Castellón, Castellón	10	(1) Castellón	
Miss Grand Ciudad Real	7th	14 Dec 2024	Los Silos de Torrenueva, Torrenueva	6	(1) Ciudad Real	
Miss Grand Córdoba	8th	2 Feb 2024	Teatro El Brillante, Córdoba	25	(1) Córdoba	
Miss Grand Euskadi	7th	26 Oct 2024	Bilbao Exhibition Centre, Barakaldo, Biscay	23	(2) Euskadi and Asturias (Note: The first runner-up Miss Grand Euskadi was later appointed Miss Grand Asturias.)	
Miss Grand Galicia	8th	5 Oct 2024	Salon Teatro Lalín, Lalín, Pontevedra	26	(2) Galicia and Costa Gallega	
Miss Grand Granada	8th	6 Oct 2024	San Sebastian Park, Ogíjares, Granada	28	(1) Granada	
Miss Grand Huelva	9th	16 Mar 2025	Centro Sociocultura Gadea, Huelva	8	(1) Huelva	
Miss Grand Islas Baleares	5th	16 Nov 2024	Wave Club, Palma de Mallorca, Balearic Islands	18	(2) Islas Baleares and Mediterráneo	
Miss Grand Jaén	8th	1 Mar 2025	Hotel ACG, Los Villares	12	(3) Jaén, Andalucía and Costa del Sol	
Miss Grand La Rioja	4th	19 Oct 2024	Salón Cultural del Ayuntamiento de Albelda, La Rioja	11	(1) La Rioja	
Miss Grand Las Palmas	7th	31 May 2025	Auditorio Parque del Sur, Maspalomas	8	(1) Las Palmas	
Miss Grand Madrid	8th	22 Sep 2024	Archy Club, Madrid	10	(2) Madrid and Com. de Madrid	
Miss Grand Murcia	5th	23 Mar 2025	Cine-Teatro IV Centenario de Alguazas, Murcia	10	(1) Murcia	
Miss Grand Sevilla	9th	12 Jan 2025	Teatro Municipal de Gelves, Gelves	22	(1) Sevilla	
Miss Grand Tenerife	8th	9 Dec 2024	Teatro Uni ón Tejina La Laguna, Santa Cruz de Tenerife	19	(1) Tenerife	
Miss Grand Toledo	4th	8 Feb 2025	Calle Cubas 6, Auditorium de Ugena, Toledo	6	(1) Toledo	
Miss Grand Valencia	4th	22 Feb 2025	Apertura de Puertas, Valencia	7	(1) Valencia	

== Results ==
Miss Grand Spain 2025 competition result by province
Color keys:

Winner 1st runner-up 2nd runner-up 3rd runner-up 4th runner-up	Top 10 Top 15 Unplaced No representative

Placement	Contestant
Winner	Lleida – Aitana Jiménez
1st runner-up	Sevilla – Carmen Lucía Luna
2nd runner-up	Galicia – Noemí Sartal
3rd runner-up	Costa de la Luz – Yanira Jiménez Peláez
4th runner-up	Barcelona – Vera Fluixá Arques (Note: Automatically qualified for the top 5 finalists after winning the Miss Popular Vote fast track.)
Top 10	Andalucía – Elena Cuesta; Cantabria – Valeria Olivares; Comunidad de Madrid – Cristina Saseta; Costa Brava – Odaisi de León; Jaén – María García; Tenerife – Ariana Barrios
Top 15	Atlántico – Cinthya Gavira; Córdoba – Nerea Rodríguez; Mediterráneo – Yasmín Rodríguez; Valencia – Rocío Campos
Special Awards
Miss Popular Vote	Barcelona – Vera Fluixá Arques
Miss Congeniality	Comunidad de Madrid – Cristina Saseta
Miss Photogenic	Andalucía – Elena Cuesta
Miss Elegance	Costa de la Luz – Yanira Jiménez Peláez
Miss Top Model	Jaén – María García
Best Hair	Costa Gallega – Ariadna Álvarez
Best Dance	Barcelona – Vera Fluixá Arques
Best in Swimsuit	Costa Brava – Odaisi de León

== Contestants ==
Thirty-six contestants competed for the title.

Represented	Contestant	Age (Note: Age at the time of the pageant.)	Hometown
Alicante	Andrea García	22	Madrid
Andalucía	Elena Cuesta		Cordoba
Aragón	Inés Gurrea		Zaragoza
Asturias	Maialen Markes (Note: Appointed to the title without participating in any related 2025 provincial pageants.)		Lekeitio
Atlántico	Cinthya Gavira (Note: Appointed to the title after finishing as the first runner-up in the Miss Grand Cádiz 2024 pageant.)	21	Cádiz
Barcelona	Vera Fluixá Arques	18	Gràcia
Cádiz	Laura Dowell		Puerto de Santa María
Cantabria	Valeria Olivares	18	Santa Cruz de Bezana
Castellón	Isabel Jiménez		Benicàssim
Ciudad Real	Valeria Sulbarán		Granátula de Calatrava
Comunidad de Madrid	Cristina Saseta	26	Hortaleza
Córdoba	Nerea Rodríguez		Córdoba
Costa Brava	Odaisi de León (Note: Appointed to the title after finishing as the first runner-up in the Miss Grand Barcelona 2024 pageant.)	24	El Poblenou
Costa de la Luz	Yanira Jiménez Peláez	19	Sevillana
Costa del Sol	Alicia Peña (Note: Appointed to the title after competing in the Miss Grand Jaén 2024 pageant.)		Martos
Costa Gallega	Ariadna Álvarez	21	Salceda de Caselas
Euskadi	Sara González		Euskadi
Galicia	Noemí Sartal	26	Poio
Girona	Marta Bellido	23	Barcelona
Granada	Cristina Melguizo		Granada
Huelva	Sheila Lazo	23	Huelva
Huesca	Adriana López		Huesca
Islas Baleares	Cel Rodríguez	23	Palma de Mallorca
Jaén	María García		Andújar
La Rioja	Nancy San Vicente	23	Logroño
Las Palmas	Suhaila Morán		
Lleida	Aitana Jiménez	23	Barcelona
Madrid	Natalia Menéndez		San Blas-Canillejas
Málaga	Valeria García	22	Valencia
Mediterráneo	Yasmín Rodríguez	19	Ibiza
Murcia	Marta Albaladejo		Murcia
Sevilla	Carmen Lucía Luna		Pedrera
Tarragona	Ana Ioseliani	18	Horta
Tenerife	Ariana Barrios		Santiago del Teide
Toledo	Alejandra Pérez	18	Consuegra
Valencia	Rocío Campos	27	Torrent
