= Miss Grand Toledo =

Regional pageant in Spain

- Formation: 6 October 2021; 5 years ago
- Founder: Robert Nilen
- Type: Beauty pageant
- Headquarters: Madrid
- Location: Spain
- Members: Miss Grand Spain
- Official language: Spanish
- Provincial director: Maka Arevalo

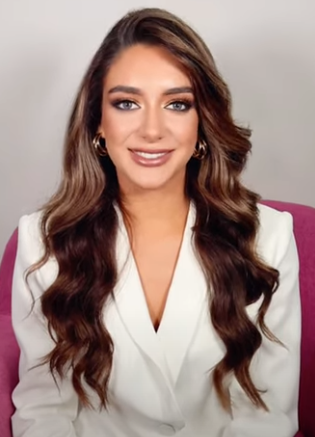
Celia Sevilla, Miss Grand Toledo 2023

Miss Grand Toledo is a Spanish provincial female beauty pageant founded by Robert Nilen in 2021, aiming to select representatives from the province of Toledo for the Miss Grand Spain national competition.

Since first participating in the Miss Grand Spain pageant, Toledo's representatives obtained the main title once in 2023, won by Celia Sevilla, who later represented the country at the international contest held in Vietnam and was placed among the top 20 finalists.

== History ==
Toledo debuted in the Miss Grand Spain pageant in 2016. From 2016 to 2018, one of the finalists in Miss Grand Ciudad Real was appointed Miss Grand Toledo. The first Miss Grand Toledo happened in 2021 after Robert Nilen obtained Madrid and Toledo's licenses for Miss Grand Spain. Since then, Toledo representatives for the national stage have been determined via a merged contest, Miss Grand Madrid – Toledo.

== Editions ==
The following table details Miss Grand Toledo's annual editions since 2021.

Edition	Date	Final venue	Entrants	Winner	Ref.
1st (Note: Held in parallel with the Miss Grand Madrid pageant.)	6 October 2021	Abaceria Hotel, Toledo	22	María Victoria Medina	
2nd	17 September 2022	Teatro Lope De Vega, Ocaña	18	Celia Sevilla	
3rd	16 September 2023	Salesianos Estrecho Auditorium, Madrid	12	Ainhoa Gallego	
4th	8 February 2025	Calle Cubas 6, Auditorium de Ugena, Toledo	6	Alejandra Pérez	

== National competition ==
The following is a list of Toledo representatives who competed at the Miss Grand Spain national pageant.

Year	Representative	Original provincial title	Placement at Miss Grand Spain	Ref.
2016	Beatriz Alba	1st runner-up Miss Grand Ciudad Real 2016	Unplaced	
2017	Andrea Salcedo	3rd runner-up Miss Grand Ciudad Real 2017	Unplaced	
2018	Adriana Nacea	1st runner-up Miss Grand Ciudad Real 2018	Unplaced	
No national contest in 2020 due to the COVID-19 pandemic
2022	María Victoria Medina	Miss Grand Toledo 2021	Top 15	
2023	Celia Sevilla	Miss Grand Toledo 2022	Winner	
2024	Ainhoa Gallego	Miss Grand Toledo 2023	Top 10	
2025	Alejandra Pérez	Miss Grand Toledo 2024		
