= Miss Grand Cádiz =

Provincial pageant in Spain

- Formation: 16 April 2016; 10 years ago
- Founder: Cristian Ramiro
- Type: Beauty pageant
- Headquarters: Cádiz
- Location: Spain
- Members: Miss Grand Spain
- Official language: Spanish

Miss Grand Cádiz is a Spanish provincial female beauty pageant, held annually since 2016 to select representatives from the Province of Cádiz for the Miss Grand Spain national competition.

Since the first competition in the Miss Grand Spain pageant, Cádiz's representatives have never won the main title but were named the third runners-up in 2019 and 2021 and qualified for the finals 10 in 2018 and 2022.

== History ==
After Vicente Gonzalez acquired the license of Miss Grand Spain in 2015, he began franchising the provincial competitions to individual organizers, who would name the provincial representatives to compete in the national pageant the following year. In the province of Cádiz, the first provincial contest of Miss Grand was organized by a local organizer, Cristian Ramiro, on 16 April 2016, at the Sala Compañía, Jerez de la Frontera, with candidates from 20 municipalities involved. Of whom, a model Cristina Lorenzo was named the first Miss Grand Cádiz.

== Editions ==
The following table details Miss Grand Cádiz's annual editions since 2016.

Edition	Date	Final venue	Entrants	Winner	Ref.
1st	16 April 2016	Sala Compañía, Jerez de la Frontera	20	Cristina Lorenzo	
2nd (Note: Representative of Ceuta was also named in the event.)	1 April 2017	Teatro Juan Luis Galiardo, San Roque	23	Carmen Carrillo	
3rd (Note: Representative of Melilla was also named in the event.)	3 June 2018	Sala Compañía, Jerez de la Frontera	30	María De Villar Moya	
4th	15 June 2019	Sala Compañía, Jerez de la Frontera	15	Guadalupe Alvarez	
5th	2 August 2020	Hontoria Garden, Jerez de la Frontera	17	Clara Navas Lora	
6th (Note: Some finalists were later appointed as Andalucía and Costa de la Luz representatives.)	25 September 2021	Monasterio de la Victoria, El Puerto de Santa María	16	Alba Pérez	
7th	23 September 2022	Teatro Juan Luis Galiardo, San Roque	23	Nuria Velat	
8th (Note: Some finalist was later appointed as Andalucía representatives.)	23 September 2023	Plaza del Faro, Barbate	28	Milene Mayo	
9th (Note: Some finalist was later appointed as Atlántico representatives.)	20 October 2024	Teatro Florida, Algeciras	21	Laura Dowell	
10th (Note: The representative of Atlántico was also named in the event.)	12 October 2025	Teatro Florida, Algeciras	21	Paula Bey	

== National competition ==
The following is a list of Cádiz representatives who competed at the Miss Grand Spain national pageant.

Color keys

- : Declared as the winner
- : Ended as a runner-up
- : Ended as a finalist
- : Ended as a semifinalist
- : Ended as special awards winner

=== As Cádiz representatives ===
Year	Miss Grand Cádiz	Title	Placement	Special Awards
2026	Paula Bey	Miss Grand Cádiz 2025	TBA	
2025	Laura Dowell	Miss Grand Cádiz 2024	Unplaced	
2024	Milene Mayo	Miss Grand Cádiz 2023	Unplaced	
2023	Nuria Vela	Miss Grand Cádiz 2022	Unplaced	
2022	Alba Pérez	Miss Grand Cádiz 2021	Top 10	
2021	Clara Navas Lora	Miss Grand Cádiz 2020	3rd runner-up	
No national pageant in 2020 due to the COVID-19 pandemic
2019	Guadalupe Alvarez	Miss Grand Cádiz 2019	3rd runner-up	
2018	María De Villar Moya	Miss Grand Cádiz 2018	Top 10	
2017	Carmen Carrillo	Miss Grand Cádiz 2017	Unplaced	
2016	Cristina Lorenzo	Miss Grand Cádiz 2016	Unplaced	

=== As Atlántico representatives ===
Year	Miss Grand Atlántico	Title	Placement	Special Awards
2026	Ainhoa Rondón	Miss Grand Atlántico 2025 (Note: Supplemental title at the Miss Grand Cádiz pageant.)	TBA	
2025	Cinthya Gavira	1st runner-up Miss Grand Cádiz 2024	Unplaced	
2024	María Llamas	1st runner-up Miss Grand Cádiz 2023	Top 10	

=== As Andalucía representatives ===
Year	Miss Grand Andalucía	Title	Placement	Special Awards
Did not compete between 2023-2026
2022	Elisabeth Rose	Miss Grand Andalucía 2021	Top 15	

=== As Costa de la Luz representatives ===
Year	Miss Grand Costa de la Luz	Title	Placement	Special Awards
Did not compete between 2023-2026
2022	María Moreno	1st runner-up Miss Grand Cádiz 2021	Top 15	

=== As Melilla representatives ===
Year	Miss Grand Melilla	Title	Placement	Special Awards
Did not compete between 2019-2026
2018	Aidamara Alcedo Gil	Miss Grand Melilla 2018	Unplaced	

=== As Ceuta representatives ===
Year	Miss Grand Ceuta	Title	Placement	Special Awards
Did not compete between 2018-2026
2017	Nina Jimeno	Miss Grand Ceuta 2017	Unplaced	
