= Miss Grand Madrid =

Regional pageant in Spain

- Formation: 23 July 2016; 10 years ago
- Founder: Franz Auza Quechover
- Type: Beauty pageant
- Headquarters: Madrid
- Location: Spain
- Members: Miss Grand Spain
- Official language: Spanish

Miss Grand Madrid or Miss Grand Community of Madrid is a Spanish regional female beauty pageant founded in 2016, aiming to select representatives from the Community of Madrid as well as the city Madrid for the Miss Grand Spain national competition.

Since first participating in the Miss Grand Spain pageant, Madrid's representatives have not won the main title yet. The highest placement they obtained was the second runner-up, won by Nicole Menayo and Andrea Ávila in 2018 and 2019, respectively.

== History ==
Madrid debuted in the Miss Grand Spain pageant in 2016 after Helen Escoriza won the first Miss Grand Madrid competition held at MOSS Club in Centro Madrid, and then participated in the Miss Grand Spain 2016 pageant. The Miss Grand Madrid contest was held annually as a separate stage, until Robert Nilen obtained Miss Grand Madrid and Miss Grand Toledo licenses in 2020, when Madrid and Toledo candidates for Miss Grand Spain were determined through the merged contest, Miss Grand Madrid – Toledo.

== Editions ==
The following table details Miss Grand Madrid's annual editions since 2016.

Edition	Date	Final venue	Entrants	Winner	Ref.
1st	23 July 2016	MOSS Club, Centro, Madrid	11	Helen Escoriza	
2nd	1 June 2018	Sala Mitty Disco Club, Madrid	14	Nicole Menayo	
3rd	9 June 2019	Sala Zenith Hall, Centro, Madrid	13	Andrea Ávila	
4th	9 November 2020	No data available	10	Debora Zancada	
5th (Note: Held in parallel with the Miss Grand Toledo pageant.)	6 October 2021	Abaceria Hotel, Toledo	22	Kristina Caci	
6th	17 September 2022	Teatro Lope De Vega, Ocaña	18	Faridi Dacasa	
7th (Note: The titleholder of Miss Grand Madrid City was also determined in the event.)	16 September 2023	Salesianos Estrecho Auditorium, Madrid	12	Alejandra Lafuente	
8th	22 September 2024	Archy Club, Madrid	10	Cristina Saseta	
9th	24 January 2026	Teatro Salesiano Estrecho, Madrid	11	Naomi Solar	

== National competition ==
The following is a list of Madrid representatives who competed at the Miss Grand Spain national pageant.

=== Autonomous community representatives ===
Year	Representative	Original provincial title	Placement at Miss Grand Spain	Ref.
2016	Helen Escoriza	Miss Grand Madrid 2016	Unplaced	
2017	Ivonne Pérez	Appointed	Unplaced	
2018	Nicole Menayo	Miss Grand Madrid 2018	2nd runner-up	
2019	Andrea Ávila	Miss Grand Madrid 2019	2nd-runner-up	
No national contest in 2020 due to the COVID-19 pandemic
2021	Debora Zancada	Miss Grand Madrid 2020	Unplaced	
2022	Kristina Caci	Miss Grand Madrid 2021	3rd runner-up	
2023	Faridi Dacasa	Miss Grand Comunidad Madrid 2022	Top 15	
2024	Bianca Elena Ionescu (Note: As the replacement for the original winner Alejandra Lafuente.)	Miss Grand Madrid–Toledo 2023 Finalist	Unplaced	
2025	Cristina Saseta	Miss Grand Comunidad Madrid 2024	Top 10	
2026	Naomi Solar	Miss Grand Comunidad Madrid 2025		

=== City representatives ===
Year	Representative	Original regional title	Placement at Miss Grand Spain	Ref.
2024	Irene Aguilera	Miss Grand Madrid 2023 (Note: Supplemental title at the Miss Grand Madrid pageant.)	Withdrew	
2025	Natalia Menéndez	Miss Grand Madrid 2024	Unplaced	
2026	Nieves Lin	Miss Grand Madrid 2025		
