= Miss Grand Jaén =

Provincial pageant in Spain

- Formation: 9 July 2017; 9 years ago
- Founder: Mercedes Latorre; Paqui Crespo
- Type: Beauty pageant
- Headquarters: Jaén
- Location: Spain
- Members: Miss Grand Spain
- Official language: Spanish

Miss Grand Jaén is a Spanish provincial female beauty pageant, held annually since 2017, to select representatives from the Province of Jaén for the Miss Grand Spain national competition.

Since the first competition in the Miss Grand Spain pageant, Jaén's representatives have not won the main title yet. The highest placement they obtained was the second runner-up in 2019, won by Miriam Herrera Juan.

== History ==
After Vicente Gonzalez acquired the license of Miss Grand Spain in 2015, he began franchising the provincial competitions to individual organizers, who would name the provincial representatives to compete in the national pageant the following year. In the province of Jaén, the license was granted to the Como Tú Eventos company directed by Mercedes Latorre and Paqui Crespo, who organized the first provincial pageant of Miss Grand Jaén on 9 July 2017, at the Hotel RL Ciudad de Úbeda, Úbeda, where an 18-year-old from Villacarrillo, Alba Maria Lara, was named the winner.

In 2022, Aroa Rodríguez became the first transgender to participate in the Miss Grand Jaén pageant.

== Editions ==
The following table details Miss Grand Jaén's annual editions since 2017.

Edition	Date	Final venue	Entrants	Winner	Ref.
1st	9 July 2017	Hotel RL Ciudad de Úbeda, Úbeda	19	Alba Maria Lara	
2nd	15 April 2018	Auditorio Municipal de Baños, Baños de la Encina	25	Pilar Serrano	
3rd	23 March 2019	Teatro-Cine Regio, Villanueva del Arzobispo	20	Miriam Herrera Juan	
4th	13 September 2020	Hotel RL Ciudad de Úbeda, Úbeda	15	Sandra Nevado Nieto	
5th	20 March 2022	Salón de Eventos Yerbabuena, Jaén	13	María José Molina	
6th	11 December 2022	Jardines de la Almazara, Mancha Real	18	Alba Hayas	
7th	25 February 2024	Caseta Municipal, Los Villares	17	Lucía Esteo	
8th	1 March 2025	Hotel ACG, Los Villares	12	María García	
9th	15 March 2026	Hotel ACG, Los Villares	9	Aisha Tejada	

== National competition ==
The following is a list of Jaén representatives who competed at the Miss Grand Spain national pageant.

Year	Representative	Original provincial title	Placement at Miss Grand Spain	Ref.
2016	Celia Navarro	Appointed	Unplaced	
2017	Alba Maria Lara	Miss Grand Jaén 2017	Top 5	
2018	Pilar Serrano Leon	Miss Grand Jaén 2018	Top 15	
2019	Miriam Herrera Juan	Miss Grand Jaén 2019	2nd runner-up	
No national pageant in 2020 due to the COVID-19 pandemic
2021	Sandra Nevado Nieto	Miss Grand Jaén 2020	Unplaced	
2022	María José Molina	Miss Grand Jaén 2021	Unplaced	
2023	Alba Hayas	Miss Grand Jaén 2022	Unplaced	
2024	Lucía Esteo	Miss Grand Jaén 2023	Unplaced	
2025	María García	Miss Grand Jaén 2024	Top 10	
