= Miss Grand Catalonia =

Regional pageant in Spain

- Formation: 12 November 2022; 3 years ago
- Type: Beauty pageant
- Headquarters: Barcelona
- Location: Spain
- Members: Miss Grand Spain
- Official language: Spanish
- Director: David Sequeiros Aguilar

Miss Grand Catalonia (Catalan: Miss Grand Catalunya) is a Spanish regional female beauty pageant founded in 2022, aiming to select representatives of the four Catalan provinces—Barcelona, Tarragona, Lleida, and Girona—for the Miss Grand Spain national competition.

Since the first competition in the Miss Grand Spain pageant, Catalan representatives have not won the main title yet. The highest placement they obtained was the top 9 finalists, won by Ainhoa González Pérez, who represented Tarragona in the 2021 national event.

== History ==
Before establishing the Miss Grand Catalonia pageant, the Catalan representatives to the Miss Grand Spain national contest were determined through two provincial events including Miss Grand Barcelona and Miss Grand Girona.In some cases, the runners-up of these two provincial pageants were later assigned to represent other Catalan provinces that lacked licensees.

== Editions ==
The following table details Miss Grand Catalonia's annual editions since 2022.

=== Date and venue ===
Edition	Date	Final venue	Entrants	Ref.
1st	12 November 2022	Hotel Melià, Sitges	31	
2nd	22 March 2024	Restaurant El Castellet, Sant Quirze del Vallès	10	
3rd	22 November 2024	Sala Aquarella, L'Eixample, Barcelona	8	

=== Winners ===
Edition	Miss Grand Barcelona	Miss Grand Girona	Miss Grand Lleida	Miss Grand Tarragona	Ref.
1st	Marta Rovira Mañé	Cristina López	Sonia Castro	Ainara Sánchez	
2nd	Susana Garcés	Nayeli Ortega	Carla Demenech	Adriana Corpas	
3rd	Vera Fluixá Arques	Appointed via casting			

== National competition ==
The following is a list of candidates from Catalonia who competed at the Miss Grand Spain national pageant.

=== As autonomy representative ===
Catalonia competed in the Miss Grand Spain pageant under the title of "Miss Grand Catalonia" only once in 2018, with the representation of Elena Expósito, who was the finalist in the Miss Grand Barcelona 2018 pageant. Still, Elena was unplaced on the national stage.

=== As provincial representatives ===
Year	Miss Grand Barcelona	Miss Grand Girona	Miss Grand Lleida	Miss Grand Tarragona	Ref.
2016	Sandra Barreiro (Unplaced)	×	×	×	
2017	Jennifer Hueso Quesada (Top 11)	×	×	×	
2018	Marta Bellido (Unplaced)	×	×	×	
2019	Andrada Morar (Unplaced)	×	×	Laia Bosquet (Unplaced)	
2021	Kethely Gomes Da Silva (Unplaced)	×	×	Ainhoa González Pérez (Top 9)	
2022	Marta Bernal (Unplaced)	Luna López (Unplaced)	Mar Pallini (Unplaced)	Lorena Sospedra (Unplaced)	
2023	Marta Rovira Mañé (Unplaced)	Cristina López (Top 15)	Sonia Castro (Unplaced)	Ainara Sánchez (Unplaced)	
2024	Susana Garcés (Unplaced)	Nayeli Ortega (Unplaced)	Carla Demenech (Unplaced)	Adriana Corpas (2nd runner-up)	
2025	Vera Fluixá Arques (TBD)	Marta Bellido (TBD)	Aitana Jiménez (TBD)	Ana Ioseliani (TBD)	
