= Miss Grand Barcelona =

Provincial pageant in Spain

- Formation: 21 April 2018; 8 years ago
- Founder: Tamara Llorente
- Type: Beauty pageant
- Headquarters: Barcelona
- Location: Spain
- Members: Miss Grand Spain
- Official language: Spanish
- Director: David Sequeiros Aguilar

Miss Grand Barcelona is a Spanish provincial female beauty pageant, founded by Tamara Llorente in 2018. The pageant's winners represent the province of Barcelona either in Miss Grand Spain or Miss Grand Catalonia pageants.

Since the first competition in the Miss Grand Spain pageant, Barcelona representatives have not won the main title yet. The highest obtained placement was the top 11, won by an appointed Jennifer Hueso in 2017. Meanwhile, at the autonomy-level competition, Miss Grand Barcelona's representative, Carla Domènech, won the title of Miss Grand Lleida in 2023.

== History ==
After Vicente Gonzalez acquired the license for Miss Grand Spain in 2015, he began franchising the provincial competitions to individual organizers, who would name the provincial representatives to compete in the national pageant the following year. In the province of Barcelona, the license was granted to an event organizer, Tamara Llorente, who organized the first Miss Grand Barcelona in 2018 when Marta Bellido was named the first Miss Grand Barcelona elected via the provincial pageant directly. From 2016 to 2017, Barcelona joined the Miss Grand Spain pageant with the representation of appointed representatives.

From 2018 to 2022, the winner of the Miss Grand Barcelona pageant directly qualified for the national contest. Later in 2023, after the establishment of an autonomy-level pageant, Miss Grand Catalonia, the representatives of the province of Barcelona for Miss Grand Spain were determined through such a contest, and the winners of the Miss Grand Barcelona pageants would be assigned to represent one of the municipalities in the said autonomy-level pageant instead.

In 2021, in addition to the main provincial stage, local pageants were also held in Anoia, Baix Llobregat, and Osona, to determine delegates for the province competition.

== Editions ==
The following table details Miss Grand Barcelona's annual editions since 2018.

| Edition | Date | Final venue | Entrants | Winner(s) | | | Ref. |
| Edition | Date | Final venue | Entrants | Delegate | Qualified for | Represented | Ref. |
|---|---|---|---|---|---|---|---|
| 1st | 21 April 2018 | No data available | 17 | Marta Bellido | Miss Grand Spain 2018 | Province of Barcelona | |
| 2nd | 15 April 2019 | No data available | | Andrada Morar | Miss Grand Spain 2019 | Province of Barcelona | |
| 3rd (Note: The pageant's 1st runners-up, Mar Pallini, was later appointed Miss Grand Lleida to compete in the Miss Grand Spain 2022 pageant.) | December 2020 | No data available | 29 | Kethely Gomes | Miss Grand Spain 2021 | Province of Barcelona | |
| 4th (Note: The pageant's 1st runners-up, Lorena Sospedra, was later appointed Miss Grand Tarragona to compete in the Miss Grand Spain 2022 pageant.) | 27 November 2021 | Sarau 08911 Club, Badalona | 25 | Marta Bernal | Miss Grand Spain 2022 | Province of Barcelona | |
| 5th | 9 June 2023 | Teatro Aquarella, L'Eixample | 11 | Carla Domènech | Miss Grand Catalonia 2023 | Sabadell | |
| 5th | 9 June 2023 | Teatro Aquarella, L'Eixample | 11 | Yaina Vicente | Miss Grand Catalonia 2023 | Plaça de Catalunya | |
| 5th | 9 June 2023 | Teatro Aquarella, L'Eixample | 11 | Susana Sevillano | Miss Grand Catalonia 2023 | Maresme | |

== Autonomy-level competition ==
Beginning in 2023, the Miss Grand Barcelona pageant winner would compete in the Miss Grand Catalonia pageant, where representatives of the four Catalan provinces—Barcelona, Tarragona, Lleida, and Girona—would be elected for the Miss Grand Spain national competition.

| Year | Represented | Representative | Original title | Placement at Miss Grand Catalonia | Ref. |
|---|---|---|---|---|---|
| 2023 | Sabadell | Carla Domènech | Miss Grand Barcelona 2023 winners | Miss Grand Lleida 2023 | |
| 2023 | Plaça de Catalunya | Yaina Vicente | Miss Grand Barcelona 2023 winners | No data available | |
| 2023 | Maresme | Susana Sevillano | Miss Grand Barcelona 2023 winners | No data available | |

== National competition ==
The following is a list of representatives of the province of Barcelona in the Miss Grand Spain national pageant. Since 2023, the representatives were determined through the Miss Grand Catalonia pageant.

| Year | Representative | Original provincial title | Placement at Miss Grand Spain | Ref. |
|---|---|---|---|---|
| 2016 | Sandra Barreiro | Appointed | Unplaced | |
| 2017 | Jennifer Hueso | Appointed | Top 11 | |
| 2018 | Marta Bellido | Miss Grand Barcelona 2018 | Unplaced | |
| 2019 | Andrada Morar | Miss Grand Barcelona 2019 | Unplaced | |
No national pageant in 2020 due to the COVID-19 pandemic
| 2021 | Kethely Gomes | Miss Grand Barcelona 2020 | Unplaced | |
| 2022 | Marta Bernal | Miss Grand Barcelona 2021 | Unplaced | |
| 2023 | Marta Rovira Mañé | Miss Grand Barcelona 2022 (Note: Title under the Miss Grand Catalonia pageant.) | Unplaced | |
| 2024 | Susana Garcés | Miss Grand Barcelona 2023 | Unplaced | |
| 2025 | Vera Fluixá Arques | Miss Grand Barcelona 2024 | | |
