= Miss Grand Las Palmas =

Regional pageant in Spain

- Formation: 23 March 2018; 8 years ago
- Type: Beauty pageant
- Headquarters: Maspalomas
- Location: Las Palmas, Spain
- Members: Miss Grand Spain
- Official language: Spanish
- Director: Rodolfo Figueroa (2021–Present)

Miss Grand Las Palmas is a Spanish provincial female beauty pageant founded in 2018, as a preliminary stage that is searching for representatives of the Province of Las Palmas to compete in the Miss Grand Spain national pageant.

Province of Las Palmas has participated in the Miss Grand Spain pageant since 2018 and won the contest twice; in 2022 and 2024, won by Hirisley Jiménez and Susana Medina, respectively.

== History ==
Las Palmas debuted in the Miss Grand Spain pageant in 2018, with the representation of Noemi González, who won the first Miss Grand Las Palmas contest held on 28 March 2018, at the Real Club Victoria in Las Palmas, outclassing the other 11 finalists. The provincial pageant was also held in 2019.

In 2020, no Miss Grand Las Palmas pageant was held separately; the representative of Las Palmas for the Miss Grand Spain 2021 was determined through another regional contest, Miss Grand Canarias, held in Puerto de la Cruz, Province of Santa Cruz de Tenerife in August. Meantime, there was another regional preliminary pageant that happened in the Las Palmas named "Miss Grand Maspalomas," in which its winner, Alba Dunkerbeck, later represented "Costa Canaria" on the national stage and won. The contest was later renamed "Miss Grand Las Palmas" the following year.

== Editions ==
The following table details Miss Grand Las Palmas's annual editions since 2018.

Edition	Date	Final venue	Entrants	Winner	Ref.
1st (Note: The titleholder of Miss Grand Atlantico, which also qualified for the national contest, was also named in the event.)	23 March 2018	Real Club Victoria, Las Palmas	12	Noemi González	
2nd	24 November 2018	Sotavento Club Muelle Deportivo, Las Palmas	15	Adela Corujo Concepción	
— (Note: As Miss Grand Canarias 2020, where the titleholders of Miss Grand Tenerife and Miss Grand Las Palmas were elected.)	16 August 2020	Gran Hotel Turquesa Playa, Puerto de la Cruz	33	Alexandra Da Silva	
3rd (Note: As Miss Grand Maspalomas 2020, organized by a different organizer, later renamed Miss Grand Las Palmas the following year.)	22 August 2020	Auditorio Foro Internacional del Turismo, Maspalomas	16	Alba Dunkerbeck (Note: Later represented "Costa Canaria" in the Miss Grand Spain 2021 pageant and won the main title.)	
4th	12 December 2021	Maspalomas Cultural Center, Maspalomas	20	Hirisley Jiménez	
5th	10 December 2022	Nordotel Hotel, Las Palmas	12	Ana Trujillo	
6th	9 December 2023	Garbo Theatre, Tarajalillo, San Bartolomé de Tirajana	14	Susana Medina	
7th	31 May 2025	Auditorio Parque del Sur, Maspalomas	8	Suhaila Morán	
8th (Note: The representatives of Costa Atlántico and Costa Canaria were also named in the event.)	11 January 2026	Sala Scala Gran Canaria, San Bartolomé de Tirajana	11	Claudia Álvarez	

== National competition ==
The following is a list of Las Palmas representatives who competed at the Miss Grand Spain national pageant.

Year	Representative	Original provincial title	Placement at Miss Grand Spain	Ref.
2018	Noemi González	Miss Grand Las Palmas 2018	Top 15	
2019	Victoria María Contreras	2nd runner-up Miss Grand Las Palmas 2019	Unplaced	
No national contest in 2020 due to the COVID-19 pandemic
2021	Alexandra Da Silva	Miss Grand Las Palmas 2020	Unplaced	
2022	Hirisley Jiménez	Miss Grand Las Palmas 2021	Winner	
2023	Dayanara Rodriguez	1st runner-up Miss Grand Las Palmas 2022	Unplaced	
2024	Susana Medina	Miss Grand Las Palmas 2023	Winner	
2025	Suhaila Morán	Miss Grand Ls Palmas 2024	Unplaced	
