= Miss Grand Galicia =

Regional pageant in Spain

- Formation: 17 June 2017; 9 years ago
- Founder: Sylvie Rodríguez
- Type: Beauty pageant
- Headquarters: Pontevedra
- Location: Spain
- Members: Miss Grand Spain
- Official language: Spanish
- Regional director: Jacobo Vázquez Alemparte

Miss Grand Galicia is a Spanish regional female beauty pageant, founded in 2017 by Sylvie Rodríguez of WomanPrivee, aiming to select representatives from the community of Galicia for the Miss Grand Spain national competition.

Since first participating in the Miss Grand Spain pageant, Galicia's representatives have not won the main title yet. The highest placement they obtained was the second runner-up, won in 2025 by Noemí Sartal, followed by the fourth runner-up, won by Iris Miguélez who competed as Miss Grand Costa Gallega in the 2019 national contest.

== History ==
Galicia debuted in the Miss Grand Spain pageant in 2022 after the license was granted to an event organizer, WomanPrivee, led by Sylvie Rodríguez, who organized the first contest of Miss Grand Galicia on 17 June 2017, at the Dux Sanxenxo, Sanxenxo, in which Carla Soage was named the winner, outclassing the other 39 finalists. However, Carla was unplaced in the national contest held on 8 July of that year in Mairena del Alcor.

In 2023, Jacobo Vázquez Alemparte was in charge of the pageant director.

== Editions ==
The following table details Miss Grand Galicia's annual editions since 2017.

Edition	Date	Final venue	Entrants	Winner	Ref.
1st (Note: The titleholder of Miss Grand Pontevedra, who also qualified for the national contest, was also named in the event.)	17 June 2017	Dux Sanxenxo, Sanxenxo	40	Carla Soage	
2nd	13 May 2018	Exe Vía Argentum Hotel, Silleda	34	Patrii Veiga	
3rd (Note: The titleholder of Miss Grand Costa Gallega, who also qualified for the national contest, was also named in the event.)	11 May 2019	Centro Comercial As Cancelas, Santiago de Compostela	28	Tania Chaves	
4th (Note: The titleholders of Miss Grand Costa Gallega and Miss Grand Costa Cantábrica, who also qualified for the national contest, were also named in the event.)	12 September 2020	Hotel Bahía de Vigo, Vigo	23	Silvia Vázquez	
5th	28 October 2021	Hotel Bahía de Vigo, Vigo	15	Aitana Paradela	
6th	6 February2023	Cultural and Sports Society Liceo Casino, Tui	11	Nuria Méndez	
7th	5 November 2023	Torroso Auditorium, Pontevedra	22	Paula Currás	
8th	5 October 2024	Salon Teatro Lalín, Lalín	26	Noemí Sartal	
9th	8 November 2025	Attica 21 Vigo Business & Wellness, Vigo	20	Carla Castrelo	

== National competition ==
The following is a list of Galicia representatives who competed at the Miss Grand Spain national pageant.

=== As autonomy representative ===
Year	Representative	Original provincial title	Placement at Miss Grand Spain	Ref.
2017	Carla Soage	Miss Grand Galicia 2017	Unplaced	
2018	Patrii Veiga	Miss Grand Galicia 2018	Unplaced	
2019	Tania Chaves	Miss Grand Galicia 2019	Unplaced	
No national contest in 2020 due to the COVID-19 pandemic
2021	Luisa María	2nd runner-up Miss Grand Galicia 2020	Unplaced	
2022	Aitana Paradela	Miss Grand Galicia 2021	Unplaced	
2023	Nuria Méndez	Miss Grand Galicia 2022	Unplaced	
2024	Marcia Lukasievicz	1st runner-up Miss Grand Galicia 2023	Unplaced	
2025	Noemí Sartal	Miss Grand Galicia 2024	2nd runner-up	

=== As provincial representatives ===
Year	Miss Grand A Coruña	Miss Grand Lugo	Miss Grand Ourense	Miss Grand Pontevedra	Ref.
2017	×	×	×	Jéssica Solleiro Bermúdez (Unplaced)	
2018	×	×	×	Alba Peiteado Meijome (Unplaced)	
2019 (Note: In 2019, the runner-up titles of the Miss Grand Galicia 2019 pageant was named after 4 Galician provinces, including A Coruña, Lugo, Ourense, and Pontevedra. Still, it was not sent to compete at the national Miss Grand Spain pageant. Iris González who won the vice queen title of Miss Grand Pontevedra was later appointed Miss Grand Costa Gallega, then competed nationally in the Miss Grand Spain 2019 pageant, where she was named the fourth runner-up.)	Estefania Garcia (Did not compete)	Ana Luisa (Did not compete)	Anna Hervàs (Did not compete)	Iris González (Note: Competed as Miss Grand Costa Gallega) (4th runner-up)	
