= Miss Grand Balearic Islands =

Provincial pageant in Spain

- Formation: 14 April 2019; 7 years ago
- Founder: Hugo Micaelo
- Type: Beauty pageant
- Headquarters: Palma de Mallorca
- Location: Spain
- Members: Miss Grand Spain
- Official language: Spanish
- Provincial director(s): Hugo Micaelo (2019–2021); Marian Valdemoros; Lucía Fernández (2023–Present)

Miss Grand Balearic Islands (Spanish: Miss Grand Islas Baleares) is a Spanish provincial female beauty pageant, founded by Hugo Micaelo in 2019. The pageant's winners represent Balearic Islands in the Miss Grand Spain national competition.

Since the first competition in the Miss Grand Spain pageant, Balearic Islands representatives won the main title once; by Mariana Rico in 2017.

== History ==
After Vicente Gonzalez acquired the license for Miss Grand Spain in 2015, he began franchising the provincial competitions to individual organizers, who would name the provincial representatives to compete in the national pageant the following year. In the Balearic Islands, the license was granted to a Mallorca-based designer and event organizer, Hugo Micaelo, who organized the first Miss Grand Balearic Islands in 2019, and Sorina Dolghieru was named the first Miss Grand Balearic Islands electing via the regional pageant.

The pageant was halted for two consecutive years from 2021 to 2022 due to lacking licensees. It was revived in 2023 after former Miss La Rioja 2005, Marian Valdemoros, and Lucía Fernández, obtained the license.

From 2016 to 2018, Balearic Islands joined the Miss Grand Spain pageant with appointed representatives, two of whom were the finalists in Miss Grand Spain's provincial competitions, held in Malaga and Sevilla.

== Editions ==
The following table details Miss Grand Balearic Islands's annual editions since 2019.

Edition	Date	Final venue	Entrants	Winner	Ref.
1st	14 April 2019	New Millennium Nightclub, Palma	20	Sorina Dolghieru	
2nd	13 February 2020	New Millennium Nightclub, Palma	N/A	Dunia Cortés Bouriah	
3rd	14 January 2023	Valparaiso Palace & Spa, Palma	14	Marina Vich Moll	
4th (Note: The Miss Grand Mediterranean titleholder, who also qualified for the national contest, were also named in the event.)	2 December 2023	Es Gremi Centre Musical, Palma	16	Ndeye Fatou	
5th	16 November 2024	Wave Club, Palma de Mallorca	18	Cel Rodríguez	
6th (Note: The representatives of Mediterráneo and Ibiza were also named in the event.)	22 November 2025	Auditori de Calvià, Mallorca	11	Bayan Al Masri	

== National competition ==
The following is a list of Balearic Islands representatives who competed at the Miss Grand Spain national pageant.

Year	Representative	Original provincial title	Placement at Miss Grand Spain	Ref.
2016	Aida Bravo	Appointed	Top 10	
2017	Mariana Rico	Appointed	Winner	
2018	Margarita Orihuela Alcaide	Appointed	Top 10	
2019	Sorina Dolghieru	Miss Grand Balearic Islands 2019	Top 10	
No national pageant in 2020 due to the COVID-19 pandemic
2021	Dunia Cortés Bouriah	Miss Grand Balearic Islands 2020/21	Unplaced	
2023	Marina Vich Moll	Miss Grand Balearic Islands 2022	Unplaced	
2024	Aura González	1st runner-up Miss Grand Balearic Islands 2023	Unplaced	
2025	Cel Rodríguez	Miss Grand Balearic Islands 2024		
