= Miss Grand Euskadi =

Regional pageant in Spain

Miss Grand Euskadi Miss Grand País Vasco Miss Grand Basque Country
- Formation: 28 April 2018; 8 years ago
- Founder: Samuel Benasco
- Type: Beauty pageant
- Headquarters: Bilbao
- Location: Spain
- Members: Miss Grand Spain
- Official language: Spanish; Basque

Miss Grand Euskadi or Miss Grand País Vasco is a Spanish regional female beauty pageant founded in 2018 by Samuel Benasco of Muevete Producciones, aiming to select representatives from the Basque Country for the Miss Grand Spain national competition.

Since first participating in the Miss Grand Spain pageant, Euskadi's representatives have not won the main title yet. The highest placement they obtained was the first runner-up, won by Oihana Torres in 2022.

== History ==
Euskadi debuted in the Miss Grand Spain pageant in 2018 after the license for Miss Grand Euskadi pageant was granted to Muevete Producciones led by Samuel Benasco, who later held the first contest of Miss Grand Euskadi, consisting of candidates from 23 municipalities, on 28 April 2018, at the Hotel Gran Bilbao, Bilbao, in which a 19-year-old Ane Álvarez Alcántara was named the first Miss Grand Euskadi. Ane later represented Euskadi in the Miss Grand Spain 2018 pageant but was unplaced.

Some titleholders were also sent to compete at other international pageants, such as the 2020 winner, Sara Lahidalga, who later represented Spain in the Reina Hispanoamericana 2024 pageant in Bolivia.

== Editions ==
The following table details Miss Grand Euskadi's annual editions since 2018.

Edition	Date	Final venue	Entrants	Winner	Ref.
1st	28 April 2018	Hotel Gran Bilbao, Bilbao	23	Ane Álvarez Alcántara	
2nd	22 February 2019	Hotel Gran Bilbao, Bilbao	19	Zuriñe Ruiz	
3rd (Note: Held in pararel with the Mister Euskadi pageant.)	21 March 2020	Serantes Theater, Santurtzi	20	Sara Lahidalga	
4th	5 November2021	Bilbao Exhibition Centre, Barakaldo	33	Oihana Torres	
5th	27 January 2023	Sala Santana 27 Event Hall, Bilbao	21	Lorea Urkia	
6th	18 November 2023	Palacio de Congresos Europa, Vitoria-Gasteiz	24	Esther Escudero	
7th	26 October 2024	Bilbao Exhibition Centre, Barakaldo, Biscay	23	Sara Gonzales	
8th	15 November 2025	Hotel Occidental Bilbao, Bilbao	22	Olaia León (Note: Later resigned/dethroned.)	

== National competition ==
The following is a list of Basque Country representatives who competed at the Miss Grand Spain national pageant.

Year	Representative	Original provincial title	Placement at Miss Grand Spain	Ref.
2018	Ane Álvarez Alcántara	Miss Grand Euskadi 2018	Unplaced	
2019	Zuriñe Ruiz	Miss Grand Euskadi 2019	Unplaced	
No national contest in 2020 due to the COVID-19 pandemic
2021	Sara Lahidalga Beneitez	Miss Grand Euskadi 2020	Unplaced	
2022	Oihana Torres	Miss Grand Euskadi 2021	1st runner-up	
2023	Lorea Urkia	Miss Grand Euskadi 2022	Unplaced	
2024	Esther Escudero	Miss Grand Euskadi 2023	4th runner-up	
2025	Sara Gonzales	Miss Grand Euskadi 2024	Unplaced	
2026	Sira Pérez	3rd runner-up Miss Grand Euskadi 2025		
