= Miss Grand Alicante =

Provincial pageant in Spain

- Formation: 24 December 2022; 3 years ago
- Founder: Yajaira Ysturis Martínez
- Type: Beauty pageant
- Headquarters: Alicante
- Location: Spain
- Members: Miss Grand Spain
- Official language: Spanish

Miss Grand Alicante is a 2022-established provincial female beauty pageant in Spain, that aims to select representatives from the province of Alicante for the Miss Grand Spain national competition.

Since the first competition in the Miss Grand Spain pageant, the highest placement obtained by Alicante representatives was the top 11 finalists, won in 2017 by Isa Soguero.

== History ==
After Vicente Gonzalez acquired the license for Miss Grand Spain in 2015, he began franchising the provincial competitions to individual organizers, who would name the provincial representatives to compete in the national pageant the following year. In the province of Alicante, the license was granted to a Venezuelan Yajaira Ysturis Martínezthe, who organized the first Miss Grand Alicante competition in 2022, with 11 contestants from different municipalities participating. Of whom Yamila Heredia was named the winner.

Alicante joined the Miss Grand Spain for the first time in 2017 represented by the appointed Isa Soguero.

In the 2023 Miss Grand Alicante competition, the Miss Grand Albacete was also named.

== Editions ==
The following table details Miss Grand Alicante's annual editions since 2022.

Edition	Date	Final venue	Entrants	Winner	Ref.
1st	24 December 2022	Villamontes Club Hipico, Alicante	11	Yamila Heredia	
2nd (Note: The representative for the province of Albacete was also named in the same event.)	13 January 2024	Auditorio Municipal, Beniarbeig	7	Claudia Napoletano	
3rd	23 November 2024	Auditorio Municipal, Beniarbeig	14	Andrea García	
4th	18 January 2026	Hotel Daniya Denia, Dénia	10	Reyes Jiménez	

== National competition ==
The following is a list of Alicante representatives who competed at the Miss Grand Spain national pageant.

Color keys

- : Declared as the winner
- : Ended as a runner-up
- : Ended as a finalist
- : Ended as a semifinalist
- : Ended as special awards winner

=== As Alicante representatives ===
Year	Representative	Title	Placement
2026	Reyes Jiménez	Miss Grand Alicante 2025	
2025	Andrea García	Miss Grand Alicante 2024	Unplaced
2024	Claudia Napoletano	Miss Grand Alicante 2023	Unplaced
2023	Yamila Heredia	Miss Grand Alicante 2022	Unplaced
Did not compete between 2018-2022 and no national pageant in 2020 due to the COVID-19 pandemic
2017	Isa Soguero	Appointed	Top 11

=== Other representatives ===
Year	Represented	Representative	Original title	Placement
2024	Albacete	Luana Gheban	Miss Grand Albacete 2023 (Note: Appointed to the title after competing in the Miss Grand Alicante 2023 pageant.)	3rd runner-up
