= Miss Grand Sevilla =

Provincial pageant in Spain

- Formation: 21 February 2016; 10 years ago
- Founder: Jonatan Lara Juan
- Type: Beauty pageant
- Headquarters: Sevilla
- Location: Spain
- Members: Miss Grand Spain
- Official language: Spanish

Miss Grand Sevilla is a Spanish provincial female beauty pageant, held annually since 2016 to select representatives from the Province of Sevilla for the Miss Grand Spain national competition.

Since the first competition in the Miss Grand Spain pageant, Sevilla's representatives won the main title once; in 2018, obtained by Mariola Partida, but was later dethroned before entering the international competition.

== History ==
After Vicente Gonzalez acquired the license for Miss Grand Spain in 2015, he began franchising the provincial competitions to individual organizers, who would name the provincial representatives to compete in the national pageant the following year. In the province of Sevilla, the first provincial contest of Miss Grand happened on 21 February 2016, at the Gran Casino Aljarafe, Tomares, with candidates from 24 municipalities involved. Of whom, a 21-year-old University of Seville student representing Triana, Cynthia Ruz, was named the first Miss Grand Sevilla.

To participate in the event, several municipalities in Seville held local competitions or auditions to determine their representatives. However, some of Miss Grand Sevilla candidates might be directly elected by the provincial organizer.

== Editions ==
The following table details Miss Grand Sevilla's annual editions since 2016.

Edition	Date	Final venue	Entrants	Winner	Ref.
1st	21 February 2016	Gran Casino Aljarafe, Tomares	24	Cynthia Ruz	
2nd	2 April 2017	Hacienda Pando Hall, Bollullos de la Mitación	40	Susy Sánchez	
3rd	4 March 2018	El Marchenero Ballroom, Utrera	40	Mariola Partida	
4th	19 May 2019	Teatro de la Villa del Conocimiento y las Artes, Mairena del Alcor	30	Nuria Rodríguez	
5th	8 August 2020	River Park Eventos, Rìo terraza, Sevilla	21	Cynthia Carrasco	
6th	5 September 2021	Abades Benacazón Hoteles, Benacazón	16	María Domínguez	
7th	14 January 2023	Teatro de la Villa del Conocimiento y las Artes, Mairena del Alcor	20	Andrea Boza	
8th	17 December 2023	Centro Cultural Pastora Soler, Coria del Río	22	Mayka Rodríguez	
9th	12 January 2025	Teatro Municipal de Gelves, Gelves	22	Carmen Lucía Luna	

== National competition ==
The following is a list of Sevilla representatives who competed at the Miss Grand Spain national pageant.

Year	Representative	Original provincial title	Placement at Miss Grand Spain	Ref.
2016	Cynthia Ruz	Miss Grand Sevilla 2016	3rd runner-up	
2017	Susy Sánchez	Miss Grand Sevilla 2017	1st runner-up	
2018	Mariola Partida	Miss Grand Sevilla 2018	Winner (Note: Dethroned)	
2019	Nuria Rodríguez	Miss Grand Sevilla 2019	Top 14	
No national contest in 2020 due to the COVID-19 pandemic
2021	Cynthia Carrasco	Miss Grand Sevilla 2020	Unplaced	
2022	María Domínguez	Miss Grand Sevilla 2021	Top 15	
2023	Andrea Boza	Miss Grand Sevilla 2022	Top 10	
2024	Mayka Rodríguez	Miss Grand Sevilla 2023	Top 10	
2025	Carmen Lucía Luna	Miss Grand Sevilla 2024	1st runner-up	
