= Miss Grand Tenerife =

Regional pageant in Spain

- Formation: 21 March 2016; 10 years ago
- Type: Beauty pageant
- Headquarters: Santa Cruz de Tenerife
- Location: Santa Cruz de Tenerife, Spain
- Members: Miss Grand Spain
- Official language: Spanish

Miss Grand Tenerife is a Spanish provincial female beauty pageant founded in 2016, as a preliminary stage that is searching for representatives of the Santa Cruz de Tenerife province to compete in the Miss Grand Spain national pageant.

Province of Santa Cruz de Tenerife has participated in the Miss Grand Spain pageant since 2016 but has not won the contest yet. The highest achievement at the national level obtained by its representatives was the 1st runner-up, won in 2021 and 2024 by Corina Mrazek González and Idayra Tena, respectively.

== History ==
Santa Cruz de Tenerife debuted in the Miss Grand Spain pageant in 2016, with the representation of Gara Ramos Glez, who won the first contest of Miss Grand Tenerife held in March 2016. Later in 2017, the licensee planned to organize the second edition, but the project was canceled for undisclosed reasons and the representative for the Miss Grand Spain 2017 pageant was appointed instead.

The 2020 edition of the pageant was delayed to March 2021 due to the COVID-19 pandemic.

== Editions ==
The following table details Miss Grand Tenerife's annual editions since 2016.

Edition	Date	Final venue	Entrants	Winner	Ref.
1st	20 March 2016	No data available	13	Gara Ramos Glez	
2nd	9 June 2018	Cafetería Centro Cultural y de Recreo, Arafo	10	Lucía Arteaga	
3rd	27 April 2019	Cafetería Centro Cultural y de Recreo, Arafo	20	Noelia Dorta	
4th	14 March 2021	Bambú Lounge Bar, Santa Cruz de Tenerife	21	Corina González	
5th	27 March 2022	Orfeon La Paz, San Cristóbal de La Laguna	17	Fabiola Sánchez	
6th	27 November 2022	Teobaldo Power Performing Arts Centre, La Orotava	12	Carolina Barroso	
7th	5 November 2023	Teatro Unión Tejina, Santa Cruz de Tenerife	20	Idayra Tena	
8th	9 December 2024	Teatro Uni ón Tejina La Laguna, Santa Cruz de Tenerife	19	Ariana Barrios	
9th	27 October 2025	Plaza de Los Remedios, Buenavista del Norte	20	Ainhoa Jiménez	

== National competition ==
The following is a list of Santa Cruz de Tenerife representatives who competed at the Miss Grand Spain national pageant.

Color keys

- : Declared as the winner
- : Ended as a runner-up
- : Ended as a finalist
- : Ended as a semifinalist
- : Ended as special awards winner

=== As Tenerife representatives ===
Year	Miss Grand Tenerife	Title	Placement	Special Awards
2026	Ainhoa Jiménez	Miss Grand Tenerife 2025	TBA	
2025	Ariana Barrios	Miss Grand Tenerife 2024	Top 10	
2024	Idayra Tena	Miss Grand Tenerife 2023	1st runner-up	
2023	Carolina Barroso Pérez	Miss Grand Tenerife 2022	2nd runner-up	
2022	Fabiola Sánchez	Miss Grand Tenerife 2021	Unplaced	
2021	Corina Mrazek González	Miss Grand Tenerife 2020	1st runner-up	
No national contest in 2020 due to the COVID-19 pandemic
2019	Noelia Dorta Hernández	Miss Grand Tenerife 2019	Unplaced	
2018	Lucy Arteaga Rodríguez	Miss Grand Tenerife 2018	Unplaced	
2017	Claudia San Luis Barreto	Appointed	Unplaced	
2016	Gara Ramos Glez	Miss Grand Tenerife 2016	Unplaced	

=== As Islas Afortunadas representatives ===
Year	Miss Grand Islas Afortunadas	Title	Placement	Special Awards
2026	Catalina Salazar	Miss Grand Islas Afortunadas 2025	TBA	
Did not compete between 2024-2025
2023	Daniela González Delgado	Miss Grand Islas Afortunadas 2022	Unplaced	
2022	Ana Luisa Herrera	Miss Grand Islas Afortunadas 2021	Unplaced	
