= Miss Grand Cantabria =

Provincial pageant in Spain

- Formation: 1 June 2019; 7 years ago
- Founder: Candé Rodríguez
- Type: Beauty pageant
- Headquarters: Torrelavega
- Location: Spain
- Members: Miss Grand Spain
- Official language: Spanish

Miss Grand Cantabria is a Spanish provincial female beauty pageant founded by Candé Rodríguez in 2019, aiming to select representatives from the province of Cantabria for the Miss Grand Spain national competition.

Since first participating in the Miss Grand Spain pageant, Cantabria's representatives won the main title once in 2019, by Ainara De Santamaría. Other featured placements, including the 2016's second runner-up and 2023's fourth runner-up, won by Leticia Burgos and Marina Edilla, respectively.

== History ==
Cantabria debuted in the Miss Grand Spain pageant in 2016 with the representation of an appointed Leticia Burgosafter, who was previously named the first runner-up in the Miss Teen Spain 2014 pageant. After two consecutive years of absence, the license of Miss Grand Cantabria was then purchased in 2019 by Candé Rodríguez, who organized the first edition of the Miss Grand Cantabria pageant on 1 June 2019, at the Hotel Campomar, Isla, where a model Ainara De Santamaría was elected the winner, over the other 18 finalists. The pageant has been held annually since then.

== Editions ==
The following table details Miss Grand Cantabria's annual editions since 2019.

Edition	Date	Final venue	Entrants	Winner	Ref.
1st	1 June 2019	Hotel Campomar, Isla	19	Ainara De Santamaría	
2nd	7 March 2022	Palacio de la Magdalena, Santander	18	María Pardo	
3rd	26 August 2022	Teatro Municipal Concha Espina, Torrelavega	26	Marina Edilla	
4th	21 October 2023	IES Marques de Santillana Auditorium, Torrelavega	19	Zulema de la Paz	
5th	19 January 2025	Teatro Vimenor, Piélagos	21	Valeria Olivares	
6th	26 October 2025	Pabellón José Escandón, Santa Cruz de Bezana	19	Alba Perez	

== National competition ==
The following is a list of Cantabria representatives who competed at the Miss Grand Spain national pageant.

Color keys

- : Declared as the winner
- : Ended as a runner-up
- : Ended as a finalist
- : Ended as a semifinalist
- : Ended as special awards winner

=== As Cantabria representatives ===
Year	Miss Grand Cantabria	Title	Placement	Special Awards
2026	Alba Perez	Miss Grand Cantabria 2025	TBA	
2025	Valeria Olivares	Miss Grand Cantabria 2024	Top 10	
2024	Zulema de la Paz	Miss Grand Cantabria 2023	Unplaced	
2023	Marina Edilla	Miss Grand Cantabria 2022	4th runner-up	
2022	María Pardo	Miss Grand Cantabria 2021	Top 10	
No national contest in 2020 due to the COVID-19 pandemic and did not compete in 2021
2019	Ainara De Santamaría	Miss Grand Cantabria 2019	Winner	
Did not compete between 2017-2018
2016	Leticia Burgos	Appointed	2nd runner-up	
