= Miss Grand Murcia =

Regional pageant in Spain

- Formation: 27 May 2018; 8 years ago
- Type: Beauty pageant
- Headquarters: Murcia
- Location: Spain
- Members: Miss Grand Spain
- Official language: Spanish

Miss Grand Murcia is a 2018-established regional female beauty pageant in Spain, that aims to select representatives from the region of Murcia for the Miss Grand Spain national competition.

Since the first competition in the Miss Grand Spain pageant, the highest placement obtained by Murcia representatives was the first runner-up, won by Patricia López in 2018; however, Patricia was later promoted to the title of Miss Grand Spain 2018 after the original winner resigned.

== History ==
After Vicente Gonzalez acquired the license for Miss Grand Spain in 2015, he began franchising the provincial competitions to individual organizers, who would name the provincial representatives to compete in the national pageant the following year. In the region of Murcia, the first Miss Grand Ciudad Real competition was held at the Casa Cultura Mazarrón in Mazarrón on 27 May 2018, with 11 contestants from different municipalities participating. Of whom, an 18-year-old student of English Philology at the University of Murcia, Patricia López, was named the first Miss Grand Murcia.

== Editions ==
The following table details Miss Grand Murcia's annual editions since 2018.

Edition	Date	Final venue	Entrants	Winner	Ref.
1st	27 May 2018	Casa Cultura Mazarrón, Mazarrón	11	Patricia López	
2nd	27 February 2022	Hotel NH Amistad Murcia	12	Miriam Avilés	
3rd	5 February 2023	Hotel Sercotel Amistad Murcia, Murcia	14	Maria Moreno	
4th	10 March 2024	Hotel Sercotel Amistad Murcia, Murcia	7	Daniela Qiuntero	
5th	23 March 2025	Cine-Teatro IV Centenario de Alguazas, Murcia	10	Yulieth Martinez	

== National competition ==
The following is a list of Murcia representatives who competed at the Miss Grand Spain national pageant.

Year	Representative	Original provincial title	Placement at Miss Grand Spain	Ref.
2017	Nabila Calvente	Appointed	Unplaced	
2018	Patricia López	Miss Grand Murcia 2018	1st runner-up (Note: Later promoted to Miss Grand Spain 2018 title after the original winner resigned.)	
No national pageant in 2020 due to the COVID-19 pandemic
2022	Miriam Avilés	Miss Grand Murcia 2022	Top 10	
2023	Maria Moreno	Miss Grand Murcia 2023	Top 15	
2024	Daniela Qiuntero	Miss Grand Murcia 2023	Top 15	
2025	Marta Albaladejo	1st runner-up Miss Grand Murcia 2024	Unplaced	
