= Miss Grand Spain =

National beauty pageant in Spain

- Established: 23 June 2016; 10 years ago
- Founder: Vicente Gonzalez
- Type: Beauty pageant
- Headquarters: Seville
- Location: Spain
- Official language: Spanish
- Key people: Vicente Gonzalez (President)
- Parent organization: Miss Grand International Ltd.
- Website: www.missgrandspain.es

Miss Grand Spain (Spanish: Miss Grand España) is a national female beauty pageant in Spain that has been held annually since 2016 to select the country representatives to compete in Miss Grand International pageant. Its inaugural edition was held in Seville with 24 provinces and autonomous communities participating; in which Adriana Sánchez Rivas of Málaga won the main title. The pageant has been owned by Vicente Gonzalez since the establishment.

== Background ==
=== History ===
Miss Grand Spain was held for the first time in 2016 after Vicente Gonzalez took over the franchise from the former owner, Marcel Arnalot Salazar, in 2015. Few provincial pageants were held to select their representatives for the inaugural edition such as Miss Grand Sevilla, Miss Grand Huelva, and Miss Grand Ciudad Real. However, the number of its preliminary contest was significantly increased to 24 in the 2021 edition. In some provinces, for instance, Seville, Huelva, and Cádiz, local pageants are also held to determine delegates for the province competition, in which winners hold the title "Miss Grand (Province)" for the year of their reign. Some runners-up of the provincial pageants might be appointed to represent the neighboring provinces in case the directors of such provinces were lacking.

The pageant was canceled in 2020 due to the COVID-19 pandemic. It was originally scheduled to be held at the Fair Pavilion in the city of Daimiel in Ciudad Real Province on 3 October, with 31 provincial representatives. Nonetheless, all candidates instead gained the right to participate in Las Palmas for the succeeding edition, Miss Grand Spain 2021. The event also featured the presence of Dori Rodríguez from Navarre, the first openly transgender contestant to compete for the Miss Grand Spain title.

Since 2018, the pageant, including its regional organs, has collaborated with many non-governmental organizations (NGOs) to raise funds available and provide necessities for the needed people, such as; the Pequeño Valiente Foundation, which is dedicated to providing the necessary support to children and families affected by childhood cancers, as well as the Mechones Solidarios, the Málaga-based NGO that produce and donate natural hair wigs to chemotherapy-induced and universal alopecia patients.

=== Date and Location ===
The following list is the edition detail of the Miss Grand Spain contest, since its inception in 2016.

Year	Edition	Date	Final venue	Host Province	Entrants	Ref.
2016	1st	18 July	Teatro de la Villa del Conocimiento y las Artes, Mairena del Alcor	Seville	24	
2017	2nd	8 July	Teatro de la Villa del Conocimiento y las Artes, Mairena del Alcor	Seville	28	
2018	3rd	30 June	Cerezo Theater, Carmona	Seville	34	
2019	4th	6 July	Hotel Campomar, Arnuero	Cantabria	31	
2020	The pageant was canceled due to the COVID-19 pandemic.					
2021	5th	16 May	Hotel Orquídea, Bahía Feliz	Las Palmas	27	
2022	6th	2 May	South Park Auditorium, Maspalomas	Las Palmas	34	
2023	7th	25 March	Centro Comercial Martiánez Shopping Mall, Puerto de la Cruz	Santa Cruz de Tenerife	34	
2024	8th	11 May	Teatro Municipal Horacio Noguera, Isla Cristina	Huelva	35	
2025	9th	14 June	Pabellón Auditorio Miguel Ángel Cerezo Nieto, Adamuz	Córdoba	36	
2026	10th	6 June	Carpa Municipal de Mogán, Plaza Pérez Galdós de Arguineguín, Mogán	Las Palmas	36	

== Regional pageants ==
Since 2016, several provinces have organized local contests to select representatives to compete in the Miss Grand Spain pageant, as detailed below.

- Andalusia: 8 pageants
  - Miss Grand Almería
  - Miss Grand Cádiz
  - Miss Grand Córdoba
  - Miss Grand Granada
  - Miss Grand Huelva
  - Miss Grand Jaén
  - Miss Grand Málaga
  - Miss Grand Sevilla
- Aragon: 2 pageants
  - Miss Grand Aragon
  - Miss Grand Zaragoza
- Asturias: no regional pageant
- Balearic Islands: 1 pageant
  - Miss Grand Balearic Islands
- Basque Country: 1 pageant
  - Miss Grand Euskadi
- Canary Islands: 2 pageants
  - Miss Grand Las Palmas
  - Miss Grand Tenerife
- Cantabria: 1 pageant
  - Miss Grand Cantabria
- Castile and León: no regional pageant
- Castilla–La Mancha: 2 pageants
  - Miss Grand Ciudad Real
  - Miss Grand Toledo
- Catalonia: 3 pageants
  - Miss Grand Barcelona
  - Miss Grand Catalonia
  - Miss Grand Girona
- Extremadura: 1 pageant
  - Miss Grand Extremadura
- Galicia:1 pageant
  - Miss Grand Galicia
- La Rioja: 1 pageant
  - Miss Grand La Rioja
- Madrid:1 pageant
  - Miss Grand Madrid
- Murcia: 1 pageant
  - Miss Grand Murcia
- Navarre: 1 pageant
  - Miss Grand Navarra
- Valencia:3 pageants
  - Miss Grand Alicante
  - Miss Grand Castellón
  - Miss Grand Valencia

== Main pageant ==
The pre-pageant of Miss Grand Spain usually commenced a week before the grand final contest, consisting of the swimsuit competition, personal interview, national costume round, and preliminary competition. In the preliminary round, held 2–3 days before the grand final, all contestants will compete in swimwear, cocktail dresses, and evening gowns in front of a panel of preliminary judges. Each round of the preliminary competition together with the Swimsuit competition will determine the winner of the Best Evening Gown, Best cocktail dress, as well as the Best in Swimsuit awards, all such awards will be announced later in the grand final round. Moreover, the scores from all pre-pageant portions, also determine the quarterfinalists during the grand final telecast of the pageant.

=== Competition results ===
Year	Miss Grand Spain	Runners-Up				Ref.
Year	Miss Grand Spain	First runner-up	Second runner-up	Third runner-up	Fourth runner-up	Ref.
2013	Las Palmas – Jenifer Guedes León	No runners-up, the titleholders were appointed to the position.				
2014	Almería – Nazaret Hurtado	No runners-up, the titleholders were appointed to the position.				
2015	Málaga – Andrea de Cozar	No runners-up, the titleholders were appointed to the position.				
2016	Málaga – Adriana Sánchez Rivas	Salamanca – Susana Sanchez	Cantabria – Leticia Burgos	Seville – Cynthia Ruz	Valencia – Lidia Regolf	
2017	Balearic Islands – Mariana Rico	Seville – Susana Sanchez	Andalusia – Carolina Santos	Granada – Paola Morales	Jaén – Alba Maria Lara	
2018	Seville – Mariola Partida Angulo^{[γ]}	Murcia – Patricia López Verdes^{[α]}	Madrid – Nicole Menayo^{[δ]}	Valencia – Djabu Balde	Salamanca – Triana Almenara	
2019	Cantabria – Ainara de Santamaría	Madrid – Andrea Ávila	Jaén – Miriam Herrera	Cádiz – Guadalupe Álvarez	Costa Gallega – Iris Miguélez	
2020	Costa Gallega – Iris Miguélez^{[α]}	No runners-up, the pageant was entirely canceled due to the COVID-19 pandemic caused the organizer to appoint the 2019 runner-up to represent the country in the Miss Grand International 2020 pageant instead.				
2020	Madrid – Andrea De las Heras^{[α]}^{[β]}	No runners-up, the pageant was entirely canceled due to the COVID-19 pandemic caused the organizer to appoint the 2019 runner-up to represent the country in the Miss Grand International 2020 pageant instead.				
2020	Cáceres – Sara González^{[γ]}	No runners-up, the pageant was entirely canceled due to the COVID-19 pandemic caused the organizer to appoint the 2019 runner-up to represent the country in the Miss Grand International 2020 pageant instead.				
2021	Costa Canaria – Alba Dunkerbeck	Tenerife – Corina Mrazek	Granada – Luisa Victoria	Cádiz – Clara Navas	Extremadura – Jeannette García	
2022	Las Palmas – Hirisley Jiménez	Euskadi – Oihana Torres	Zaragoza – Anakristina Rivero	Madrid – Kristina Caci	Granada – Natalia Quirós	
2023	Toledo - Celia Sevilla	La Rioja - Alejandra León	Tenerife - Carolina Pérez	Almería - Denisse Andor	Cantabria - Marina Edilla	
2024	Las Palmas – Susana Medina	Tenerife – Idayra Tena	Tarragona – Adriana Corpas	Albacete – Luana Gheban	Euskadi – Esther Escudero	
2025	Lleida – Aitana Jiménez	Sevilla – Carmen Lucía Luna	Galicia – Noemí Sartal	Costa de la Luz – Yanira Jiménez	Barcelona – Vera Fluixá Arques	
2026	Almería – Alba María Ruiz	Girona – Dayma Fernandez	Barcelona – Elisabeth Borne	Las Palmas – Claudia Álvarez	Madrid – Nieves Lin	
Note^α Successor.^β Resigned.^γ Dethroned^δ Nicole Menayo was later designated Miss Grand Costa Rica 2018 by Gerson Jimenez, the Miss Grand International franchise holder for Costa Rica.

=== Winner gallery ===
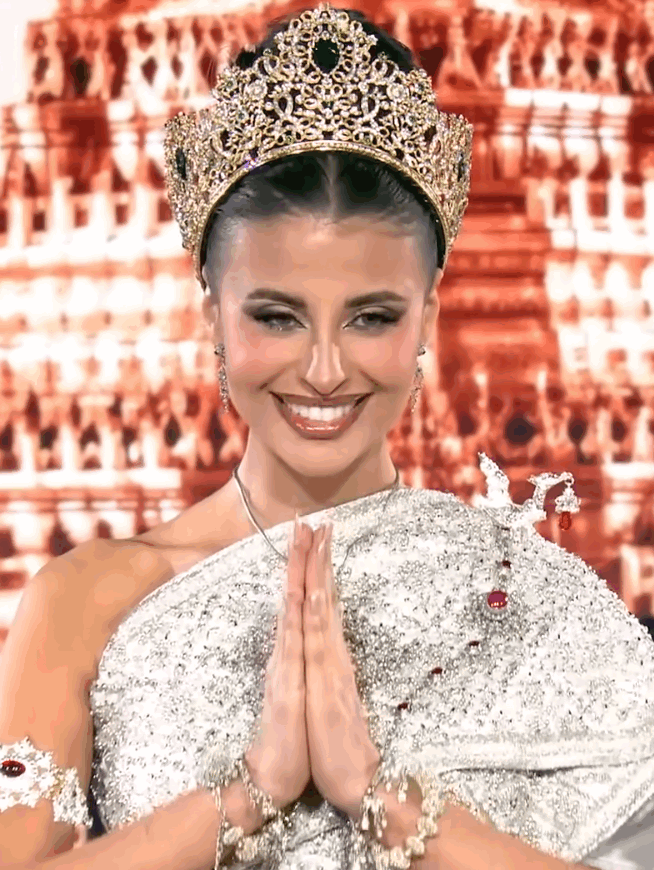
Miss Grand Spain 2025
Aitana Jiménez
(Lleida)

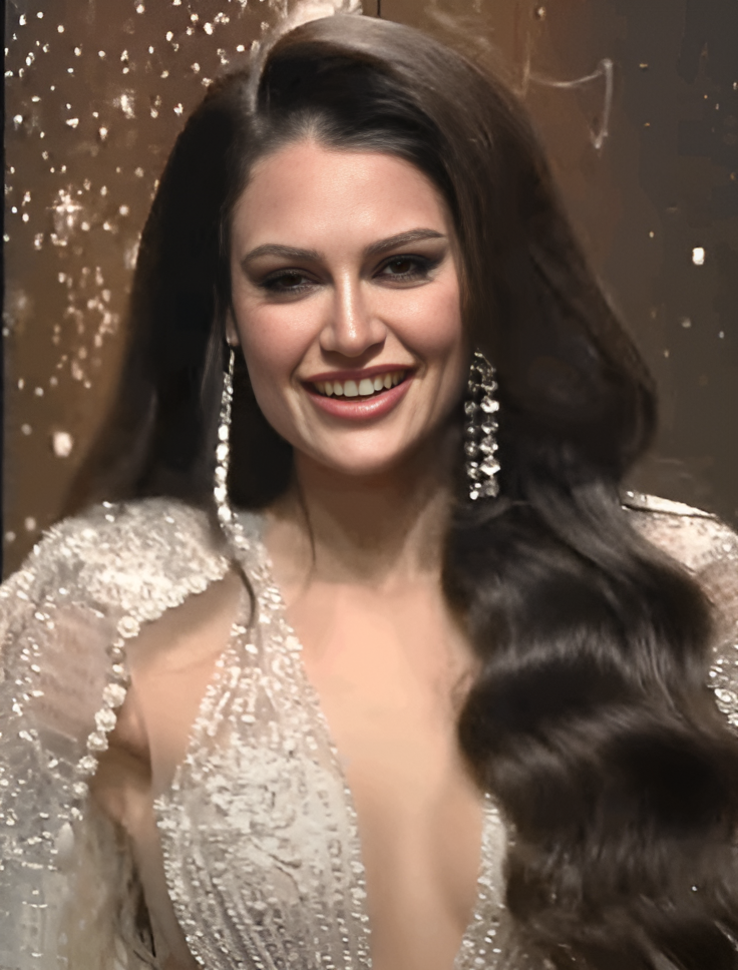
Miss Grand Spain 2024
Susana Medina
(Las Palmas)

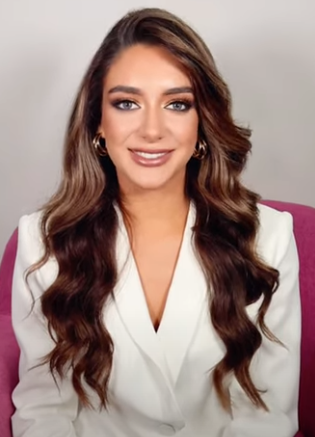
Miss Grand Spain 2023
Celia Sevilla
(Toledo)

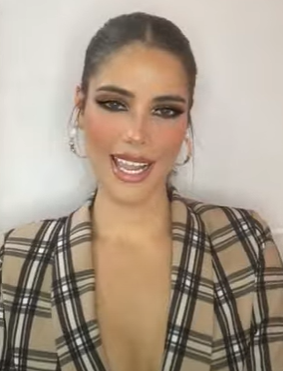
Miss Grand Spain 2022
Hirisley Jimenez
(Las Palmas)

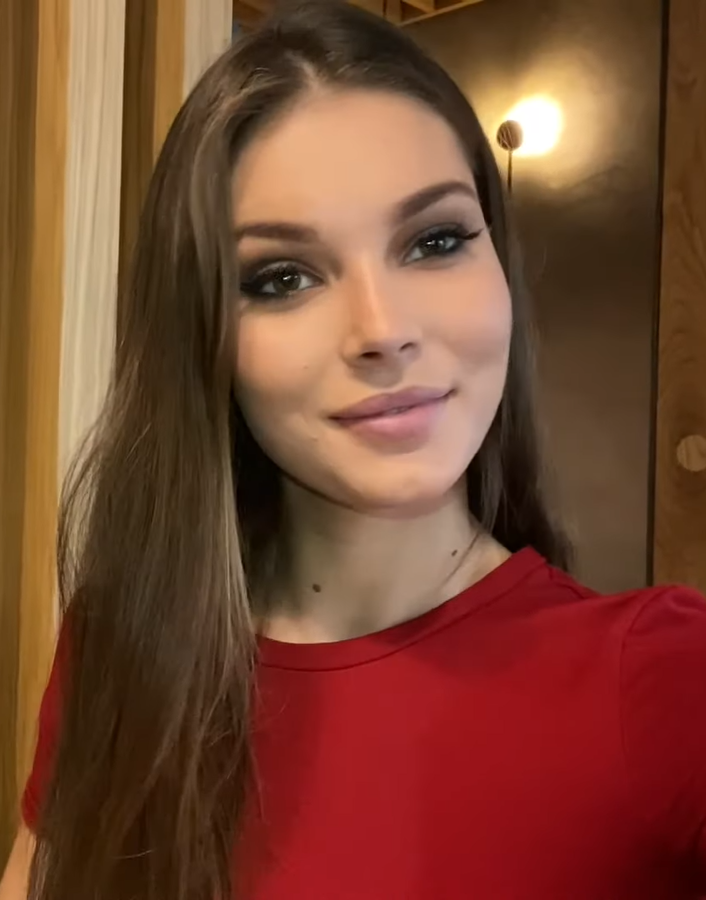
Miss Grand Spain 2021
Alba Dunkerbeck
(Costa Canaria)

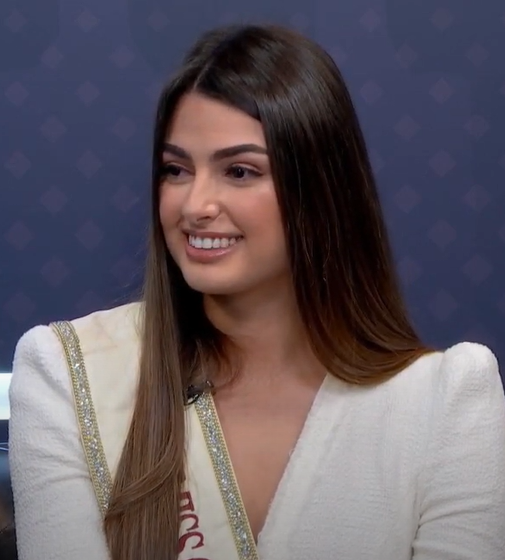
Miss Grand Spain 2020
Iris Miguélez Méndez
(Costa Gallega)

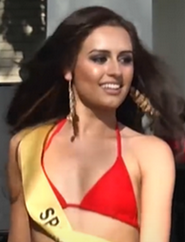
Miss Grand Spain 2015
Andrea de Cozar
(Málaga)

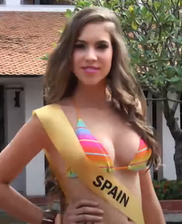
Miss Grand Spain 2014
Nazaret Hurtado
(Las Palmas)

== International placements ==
The following is a list of Spanish representatives at Miss Grand International.

Color keys

- : Declared as Winner
- : Ended as runner-up or top 5/6 qualification
- : Ended as one of the Finalists
- : Ended as one of the Semi-finalists
- : Ended as special awards winner

Year	Representative	Province	National qualification	Placement	Special Awards	National Director
2026	Alba María Ruiz	Almería	Miss Grand Spain 2026	Top 25		Vicente Gonzalez
2025	Aitana Jiménez	Lleida	Miss Grand Spain 2025	2nd runner-up		Vicente Gonzalez
2024	Susana Medina	Las Palmas	Miss Grand Spain 2024	3rd runner-up (Note: Originally named the 5th runner-up, but was later promoted to the 3rd runner-up following the dethronement and resignation of several 2024 top 5 finalists.)		Vicente Gonzalez
2023	Celia Sevilla	Toledo	Miss Grand Spain 2023	Top 20		Vicente Gonzalez
2022	Hirisley Jiménez	Las Palmas	Miss Grand Spain 2022	5th runner-up		Vicente Gonzalez
2021	Alba Dunkerbeck	Costa Canaria	Miss Grand Spain 2021	Top 10		Vicente Gonzalez
2020	Iris Miguélez	Pontevedra	4th runner-up - Miss Grand Spain 2019	Unplaced		Vicente Gonzalez
2019	Ainara de Santamaría	Cantabria	Miss Grand Spain 2019	Top 20		Vicente Gonzalez
2018	Patricia López Verdes	Murcia	1st Runner-up - Miss Grand Spain 2018	Top 10		Vicente Gonzalez
2018	Mariola Partida Angulo	Seville	Miss Grand Spain 2018	Resigned		Vicente Gonzalez
2017	Mariana Rico	Balearic Islands	Miss Grand Spain 2017	Unplaced		Vicente Gonzalez
2016	Adriana Sánchez Rivas	Málaga	Miss Grand Spain 2016	Top 20		Vicente Gonzalez
2015	Andrea de Cozar	Málaga	Appointment	Top 10		Vicente Gonzalez
2014	Nazaret Hurtado	Almería	Appointment	Unplaced		Marcel Arnalot Salazar
2013	Jenifer Guedes León	Las Palmas	Appointment	Unplaced		Marcel Arnalot Salazar

== National pageant candidates ==
=== Participating regional and territories ===
Regional/territories	1st	2nd	3rd	4th	5th	6th	7th	8th	9th	10th
Albacete	Y									
Alicante		11					Y	Y	Y	Y
Almería		Y	Y		Y	15				
Andalucía			Y	14	9	15	10	10	10	16
Aragón									Y	Y
Asturias		11	Y	14	Y			Y	Y	
Atlántico			Y	Y	Y	Y	Y	15	15	Y
Badajoz	Y		15	Y						
Baleares					Y					
Barcelona	Y	11	Y	Y	Y	Y	Y	Y		
Burgos				Y						
Cáceres	Y			Y						
Cádiz	Y	Y	10			10	Y	Y	Y	11
Canarias			Y							
Cantabria						10		Y	10	Y
Castellón	10						Y	15	Y	Y
Castilla-La Mancha		Y								
Cataluña			Y							
Ceuta	Y	Y	Y							
Ciudad Real	Y	Y	10	Y	Y	Y		Y	Y	
Comunidad de Madrid									10	16
Córdoba	Y	Y	Y	Y	9	Y	15	10	15	11
Costa Atlántico										11
Costa Brava									10	Y
Costa Canaria						10	10	15		Y
Costa Cantábrica						Y				
Costa de la Luz			15		9	15		Y		Y
Costa del Sol			Y	10	13	Y	10	Y	Y	
Costa Gallega					Y	Y	Y	Y	Y	Y
Euskadi							Y		Y	Y
Extremadura		11	10	Y		Y	10	Y		
Galicia		Y	Y	Y	Y	Y	Y	Y		Y
Girona						Y	15	Y	Y	
Granada	10	5	Y	14			Y	Y	Y	11
Guadalajara	Y	Y								
Huelva	10	11	15	10	13	Y	Y	Y	Y	Y
Huesca									Y	
Ibiza										11
Islas Afortunadas						Y	Y			Y
Islas Baleares	10		10	10			Y	Y	Y	11
Jaén	Y	5	15		Y	Y	Y	Y	10	16
La Rioja						Y		15	Y	16
Las Palmas			15	Y	Y		Y		Y	
León				10						
Lleida						Y	Y	Y		Y
Madrid	Y	Y			Y		15	Y	Y	
Madrid City								Y		
Málaga		Y	Y	Y	Y	Y	15	Y	Y	Y
Mediterráneo				Y				10	15	Y
Melilla			Y							
Murcia		Y	(Note: Assumed)			10	15	15	Y	Y
Navarra			Y	Y	13	Y	Y			
País Vasco			Y	Y	Y					
Palencia	10				13					
Pontevedra		Y	Y							
Segovia		Y								
Salamanca										
Sevilla			(Note: Dethroned)	14	Y	15	10	10		11
Tarragona				Y	9	Y	Y		Y	Y
Tenerife	Y	Y	Y	Y		Y			10	16
Teruel										Y
Toledo	Y	Y	Y			15		10	Y	Y
Valencia		Y		Y		10	Y	Y	15	Y
Valladolid	Y	Y								
Zaragoza		11	10	10			Y	Y		Y
Total	24	28	34	31	27	34	34	35	36	36
Color keys: : Declared as the winner; : Ended as 1st runner-up; : Ended as 2nd runner-up; : Ended as 3rd runner-up; : Ended as 4th runner-up; A : Finalist, semifinalist, or unplaced; × : Representative determined but not competed; × : No representative

== See also ==
- Miss Spain
- Míster España
- Miss Earth Spain
- Miss World Málaga
