= Miss Grand Córdoba =

Provincial pageant in Spain

- Formation: 11 June 2017; 9 years ago
- Type: Beauty pageant
- Headquarters: Córdoba
- Location: Spain
- Members: Miss Grand Spain
- Official language: Spanish

Miss Grand Córdoba is a Spanish provincial female beauty pageant, held annually since 2017 to select representatives from the Province of Córdoba for the Miss Grand Spain national competition.

Since the first competition in the Miss Grand Spain pageant, Córdoba's representatives have not won the main title yet. The highest placement they reached is the top 9 finalists in 2021, obtained by Celia Torres.

== History ==
After Vicente Gonzalez acquired the license of Miss Grand Spain in 2015, he began franchising the provincial competitions to individual organizers, who would name the provincial representatives to compete in the national pageant the following year. In the province of Córdoba, the first provincial contest of Miss Grand was organized in 2017, and a model Natalia Flores was named the first Miss Grand Córdoba elected through the pageant. Previously, Córdoba once participated in Miss Grand Spain 2016, but its representative was determined via an audition.

Since 2017, the pageant has been held annually, with delegates from different municipalities in Córdoba participating.

== Editions ==
The following table details Miss Grand Córdoba's annual editions since 2017.

Edition	Date	Final venue	Entrants	Winner	Ref.
1st	11 June 2017	Salones Ayode, Córdoba	19	Natalia Flores	
2nd (Note: Representative of Andalucia was also named in the same event.)	18 March 2018	Eurostars Palace Hotel, Córdoba	29	Maria Jose López	
3rd	9 June 2019	Caseta Municipal Espiel, Espiel	21	María Salazar	
4th	30 August 2020	Hacienda La Piconera, Córdoba	28	Lucia Gonzalez	
5th	5 December 2021	Sala Genesis, Fernán Núñez	34	Naiara Afan	
6th	5 February 2023	Teatro El Brillante, Córdoba	28	Pilar Espejo	
7th	17 March 2024	Sala Genesis, Fernán Núñez	27	Rocio Mengual	
8th	2 February 2025	Teatro El Brillante, Córdoba	25	Nereard Riguez	

== National competition ==
The following is a list of Córdoba representatives who competed at the Miss Grand Spain national pageant.

Year	Representative	Original provincial title	Placement at Miss Grand Spain	Ref.
2016	Inma Romero	Appointed	Unplaced	
2017	Natalia Flores	Miss Grand Córdoba 2017	Unplaced	
2018	Maria Jose López Martín	Miss Grand Córdoba 2018	Unplaced	
2019	María Salazar	Miss Grand Córdoba 2019	Unplaced	
No national pageant in 2020 due to the COVID-19 pandemic
2021	Celia Torres	1st runner-up Miss Grand Córdoba 2020	Top 9	
2022	Naiara Afan	Miss Grand Córdoba 2021	Unplaced	
2023	Pilar Espejo	Miss Grand Córdoba 2023	Top 15	
2024	Rocio Mengual	Miss Grand Córdoba 2024	Top 10	
2025	Nereard Riguez	Miss Grand Córdoba 2025		
