= Miss Grand La Rioja =

Provincial pageant in Spain

- Formation: 26 March 2022; 4 years ago
- Founder: Yajaira Ysturis Martínez
- Type: Beauty pageant
- Headquarters: Fuenmayor
- Location: Spain
- Members: Miss Grand Spain
- Official language: Spanish

Miss Grand La Rioja is a Spanish provincial female beauty pageant founded by Yajaira Ysturis Martínez in 2022, aiming to select representatives from the province of La Rioja for the Miss Grand Spain national competition.

Since first participating in the Miss Grand Spain pageant, La Rioja's representatives have not won the main title yet. The highest and only placement they obtained was the first runner-up, won by Alejandra León in 2023.

== History ==
La Rioja debuted in the Miss Grand Spain pageant in 2022 after a model and event organizer Yajaira Ysturis Martínez obtained the license, and subsequently organized the first contest of Miss Grand La Rioja on 26 March 2022, at the Bodegas y Viñedos Heras Cordón, Fuenmayor, in which Elena Prado Marin was named the winner, outclassing the other nine finalists. However, Elena was unplaced in the national contest held on May 22 of that year in Las Palmas.

== Editions ==
The following table details Miss Grand La Rioja's annual editions since 2022.

Edition	Date	Final venue	Entrants	Winner	Ref.
1st	26 March 2022	Bodegas y Viñedos Heras Cordón, Fuenmayor	10	Elena Prado Marin	
2nd	26 November 2022	Restaurante Barros, Lardero	13	Alejandra León	
3rd	25 November 2023	Teatro Gran Coliseo, Fuenmayor	10	Valentina Pereira	
4th	19 October 2024	Salón Cultural del Ayuntamiento de Albelda, Albelda de Iregua	11	Nancy San Vicente	

== National competition ==
The following is a list of La Rioja representatives who competed at the Miss Grand Spain national pageant.

Year	Representative	Original provincial title	Placement at Miss Grand Spain	Ref.
2022	Elena Prado Marin	Miss Grand La Rioja 2021	Unplaced	
2023	Alejandra León	Miss Grand La Rioja 2022	1st runner-up	
2024	Valentina Pereira	Miss Grand La Rioja 2023	Top 15	
2025	Nancy San Vicente	Miss Grand La Rioja 2024		
