= Miss Grand Spain 2018 =

3rd edition of the Miss Grand Spain competition

- Date: 30 June 2018
- Venue: Cerezo Theater, Carmona
- Entrants: 34
- Placements: 15
- Debuts: Atlántico; Canarias; Cataluña; Costa de la Luz; Costa del Sol; Las Palmas; Melilla; Navarra; País Vasco
- Withdrawals: Alicante; Castilla-La Mancha; Guadalajara; Segovia; Valladolid
- Returns: Badajoz; Salamanca
- Winner: Patricia López Verdes (Murcia) (Assumed); Mariola Partida Angulo (Sevilla) (Dethroned)
- Congeniality: Naiara Gomez (Badajoz)
- Best National Costume: Joaquina Tais (Zaragoza)
- Photogenic: Joaquina Tais (Zaragoza)

External videos
- Grand final competition

Miss Grand Spain 2018 was the 3rd edition of Miss Grand Spain beauty contest, held at Cerezo Theater, Carmona on 30 June 2018. The contest was won by Mariola Partida Angulo of Sevilla, who was expected to represent Spain at the Miss Grand International 2018 pageant held on 25 October in Myanmar, but later dethroned. The first runner-up, Patricia López of Murcia, was promoted as the replacement.

== Results ==
Final results	Contestant
Miss Grand Spain 2018	Sevilla – Mariola Partida Angulo (Dethroned); Murcia – Patricia López Verdes (Assumed)
1st runner-up	Assumed the winner
2nd Runner-Up	Madrid – Nicole Menayo
3rd Runner-Up	Valencia – Djabu Balde
4th Runner-Up	Salamanca – Triana Almenara Domínguez
Top 10	Cádiz – María De Villar Moya; Ciudad Real – Isabel Gigante Rodado; Extremadura – Sara Cisneros; Islas Baleares – Margarita Orihuela Alcaide; Zaragoza – Joaquina Tais
Top 15	Badajoz – Naiara Gomez; Costa de la Luz – Alba Macias Gomez; Huelva – Raquel Pérez Rodríguez; Jaén – Pilar Serrano Leon; Las Palmas – Noemi González

=== Special awards ===
Award		Winner
Miss Best Congeniality		Badajoz – Naiara Gomez
Miss Best Photogenic		Zaragoza – Joaquina Tais
Miss Best Evening Gown		Costa de la Luz – Alba Macias Gomez
Miss Best Body		Madrid – Nicole Menayo
Miss Best National Costume	Winner	Zaragoza – Joaquina Tais
Miss Best National Costume	Runners-up	Canarias – Alicia Rodríguez; Jaén – Pilar Serrano Leon; Murcia – Patricia López Verdes; Tenerife – Lucy Arteaga Rodríguez; Sevilla – Mariola Partida Angulo

== Contestants ==
34 delegates were selected by regional licensees to compete for the national title of Miss Grand Spain 2018.

Represented	Contestant	Age	Hometown
Almería	Lucía Peregrin Lopez	24	Almería
Andalucía	Maria Belén Del Pino Cañete	20	Córdoba
Asturias	Stefania Andrade Ramirez	26	Madrid
Atlántico	Ariana Hernández Santana	25	Gáldar
Badajoz	Naiara Gomez	21	Mérida
Barcelona	Marta Bellido	20	Barcelona
Cádiz	María De Villar Moya	18	La Línea de la Concepción
Canarias	Alicia Rodríguez	25	Santa Cruz de Tenerife
Cataluña	Elena Expósito	18	Barcelona
Ceuta	Inma Cabezas Cruz	26	Sevilla
Ciudad Real	Isabel Gigante Rodado	18	La Solana
Córdoba	Maria Jose López Martín	23	Fuencubierta
Costa de la Luz	Alba Macias Gomez	19	Almonte
Costa del Sol	Carolina Martín	19	Málaga
Extremadura	Sara Cisneros	23	La Coruña
Galicia	Patrii Veiga	24	Pontevedra
Granada	Angy Muñoz González	19	Granada
Huelva	Raquel Pérez Rodríguez	24	Gibraleón
Islas Baleares	Margarita Orihuela Alcaide	20	Carmona
Jaén	Pilar Serrano Leon	20	Bobadilla
Las Palmas	Noemi González	24	Las Palmas de Gran Canaria
Madrid	Nicole Menayo	24	San José
Málaga	Maria Sánchez Alés	26	Antequera
Melilla	Aidamara Alcedo Gil	24	Puerto Real
Murcia	Patricia López Verdes	18	Mazarrón
Navarra	Flavia Medina	19	Bilbao
País Vasco	Ane Alvarez Alcantara	19	País Vasco
Pontevedra	Alba Peiteado Meijome	24	Pontevedra
Salamanca	Triana Almenara Domínguez	17	Dos Hermanas
Tenerife	Lucy Arteaga Rodríguez	18	Tenerife
Sevilla	Mariola Partida Angulo	21	Carmona
Toledo	Adriana Nacea	17	Ciudad Real
Valencia	Djabu Balde	26	Sevilla
Zaragoza	Joaquina Tais	19	Santander
