= Miss Grand Spain 2017 =

2nd edition of the Miss Grand Spain competition

- Date: 8 July 2017
- Venue: Teatro de la Villa del Conocimiento y las Artes, Mairena del Alcor
- Entrants: 28
- Placements: 11
- Debuts: Almería; Andalucía; Asturias; Castilla–La Mancha; Extremadura; Galicia; Murcia; Pontevedra; Segovia; Zaragoza
- Withdrawals: Badajoz; Cáceres; Cantabria; Castellón; Palencia; Salamanca
- Winner: Mariana Rico (Islas Baleares)

External videos
- Grand final

Miss Grand Spain 2017 is the 2nd edition of Miss Grand Spain beauty contest, held at Teatro de la Villa del Conocimiento y las Artes, Mairena del Alcor on 8 July 2017. The winner was Mariana Rico from Balearic Islands. Mariana then represented Spain at the Miss Grand International 2017 pageant held on 25 October 25 Vietnam, but was unplaced.

== Results ==
Final results	Contestant
Miss Grand Spain 2017	Islas Baleares - Mariana Rico
1st runner-up	Sevilla - Susy Sánchez
2nd runner-up	Andalucía - Carolina Santos
Top 5	Granada - Paola Morales; Jaén - Alba Maria Lara
Top 11	Alicante - Isa Soguero; Asturias - Alba Magan; Barcelona - Jennifer Hueso Quesada; Extremadura - Angela González; Huelva - Bela Peña; Zaragoza - Luisa González

== Contestants ==
Twenty-eight contestants competed for the title.

Province/Locality	Contestant
Alicante	Isa Soguero
Almería	Laura Funes
Andalucía	Carolina Santos
Asturias	Alba Magan
Barcelona	Jennifer Hueso Quesada
Cádiz	Carmen Carrillo
Castilla-La Mancha	Alba Rabadán
Ceuta	Nina Jimeno
Ciudad Real	Marta Carrasco
Córdoba	Natalia Flores
Extremadura	Angela González
Galicia	Carla Soage
Granada	Paola Morales
Guadalajara	Estefania Ortega
Huelva	Bela Peña
Islas Baleares	Mariana Rico
Jaén	Alba Maria Lara
Madrid	Ivonne Pérez
Málaga	Anastasia Castillo
Murcia	Nabila Calvente
Pontevedra	Jéssica Solleiro Bermúdez
Segovia	Cristina Andrea Cosareano
Tenerife	Claudia San Luis Barreto
Sevilla	Susy Sánchez
Toledo	Andrea Salcedo
Valencia	María del Mar Rodríguez
Valladolid	Patricia Alvarez
Zaragoza	Luisa González
