= Miss Grand Ciudad Real =

Provincial pageant in Spain

- Formation: 23 April 2016; 10 years ago
- Founder: José Pineño
- Type: Beauty pageant
- Headquarters: Ciudad Real
- Location: Spain
- Members: Miss Grand Spain
- Official language: Spanish

Miss Grand Ciudad Real is a 2016-established Spanish provincial female beauty pageant, that aims to select representatives from the province of Ciudad Real for the Miss Grand Spain national competition.

Since the first competition in the Miss Grand Spain pageant, Ciudad Real's representatives have not won the main title yet. The only placement they obtained was the top 10 finalists, won by Isabel Gigante in 2018.

== History ==
After Vicente Gonzalez acquired the license for Miss Grand Spain in 2015, he began franchising the provincial competitions to individual organizers, who would name the provincial representatives to compete in the national pageant the following year. In the province of Ciudad Real, the competition license was granted to a local organizer, José Pineño, who then organized the first Miss Grand Ciudad Real competition at Sercotel Guadiana, Ciudad Real on 23 April 2016, with 21 contestants from different municipalities participating. Of whom, the representative of Villarrubia de los Ojos, Ana María Urda, was named the first Miss Grand Ciudad Real.

Some municipalities, such as Valdepeñas and Villarrubia de los Ojos, also organized local preliminary pageants to select their representatives for Miss Grand Ciudad Real.

== Editions ==
The following table details Miss Grand Ciudad Real's annual editions since 2016.

Edition	Date	Final venue	Entrants	Winner	Ref.
1st	23 April 2016	Sercotel Guadiana, Ciudad Real	21	Ana Maria Urda	
2nd	21 May 2017	Teatro Municipal de Pozuelo de Calatrava	26	Marta Carrasco	
3rd	13 May2018	Hotel NH, Ciudad Real	30	Isabel Gigante	
4th	2 June 2019	Hotel NH, Ciudad Real	22	Alba Izquierdo	
5th	5 April 2021	Virtual pageant	18	Andrea Sáez Martín	
6th	27 March 2022	Sercotel Guadiana, Ciudad Real	12	Elisabeth Llenera	
7th	2024	Torrenuveva Ciudad Real		Valeria sulbaran flores	

== National competition ==
The following is a list of Ciudad Real representatives who competed at the Miss Grand Spain national pageant.

Year	Representative	Original provincial title	Placement at Miss Grand Spain	Ref.
2016	Ana Maria Urda	Miss Grand Ciudad Real 2016	Unplaced	
2017	Marta Carrasco	Miss Grand Ciudad Real 2017	Unplaced	
2018	Isabel Gigante Rodado	Miss Grand Ciudad Real 2018	Top 10	
2019	Alba Izquierdo	Miss Grand Ciudad Real 2019	Unplaced	
No national pageant in 2020 due to the COVID-19 pandemic
2021	Andrea Sáez Martín	Miss Grand Ciudad Real 2020/21	Unplaced	
2022	Elisabeth Vergara	Miss Grand Ciudad Real 2022	Unplaced	
2024	Ana López	Miss Grand Córdoba 2023 Finalist	Unplaced	
