= Miss Grand Spain 2021 =

5th edition of the Miss Grand Spain competition

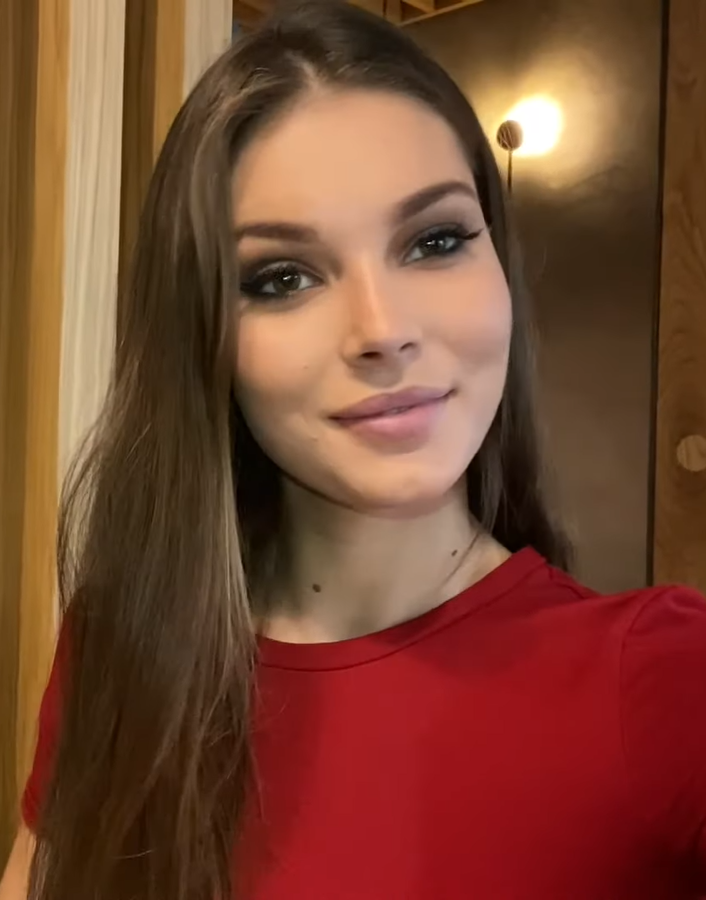
- Alba Dunkerbeck, the winner of the contest
- Date: 16 May 2021
- Presenters: Roberto Herrera
- Venue: Hotel Orquídea, Bahía Feliz Las Palmas
- Entrants: 27
- Placements: 13
- Debuts: Baleares; Costa Canaria; Tenerife
- Withdrawals: Badajoz; Burgos; Cáceres; Cantabria; Islas Baleares; León; Santa Cruz de Tenerife; Valencia; Zaragoza
- Returns: Almería; Costa de la Luz; Palencia
- Winner: Alba Dunkerbeck (Costa Canaria)
- Congeniality: Cynthia Carrasco Rosado (Sevilla)

Miss Grand Spain 2021 was the 5th edition of Miss Grand Spain beauty contest, held at the Hotel Orquídea, Bahía Feliz, Las Palmas, on 16 May 2021. Twenty-seven contestants from different provinces of the country competed for the title.

The contest was won by Alba Dunkerbeck of Costa Canaria, who then represented Spain at the Miss Grand International 2021 pageant held on 4 December in Thailand, and was placed among the top 10 finalists.

The event was hosted by Canarian presenter Roberto Herrera. The jury included the Spanish cosmetic surgeon Blas García, editor-in-chief of the magazine Semana Iván Rebosa, the stylist Manuel Zamorano, Miss Grand Spain 2019 Ainara de Santamaría, and Miss Grand Spain 2020 Iris Miguelez.

== Results ==
Final results	Contestant
Miss Grand Spain 2021	Costa Canaria – Alba Dunkerbeck
1st Runner-Up	Tenerife – Corina Mrazek González
2nd Runner-Up	Granada – Luisa Victoria Malz
3rd Runner-Up	Cádiz – Clara Navas Lora
4th Runner-Up	Extremadura – Jeannette Garcia Fernandez
Top 9	Andalucía – Jana Ros; Córdoba – Celia Torres; Costa de la Luz – María Romanco Rivero; Tarragona – Ainhoa González Pérez
Top 13	Costa del Sol – Mora Guardamagna; Huelva – Luján Monteso; Navarra – Dori Rodríguez Zubiri; Palencia – Aitana Benito
Special awards
Miss Congeniality	Sevilla – Cynthia Carrasco Rosado
Miss Elegance	Tenerife – Corina Mrazek González
Miss School	Granada – Luisa Victoria Malz

== Contestants ==
Twenty-seven delegates competed for the title.

Represented	Contestant
Almería	Janire de la Iglesia
Andalucía	Jana Ros
Asturias	Elisabet Mercedes Cid Vasylenko
Atlántico	Lucía González Rodríguez
Balearic Islands	Dunia Cortés Bouriah
Barcelona	Kethely Gomes Da Silva
Cádiz	Clara Navas Lora
Ciudad Real	Andrea Sáez Martín
Córdoba	Celia Torres
Costa Canaria	Alba Dunkenberck
Costa de la Luz	María Romanco Rivero
Costa del Sol	Mora Guardamagna
Costa Gallega	Iasmin Aguiar
Extremadura	Jeannette Garcia Fernandez
Galicia	Luisa María
Granada	Luisa Victoria Malz
Huelva	Luján Monteso
Jaén	Sandra Nevado Nieto
Las Palmas	Alexandra Del Valle Da Silva Sosa
Madrid	Elisabet Mercedes Cid Vasylenko
Málaga	Alexandra Cucu
Navarra	Dori Rodríguez Zubiri
País Vasco	Sara Lahidalga Beneitez
Palencia	Aitana Benito
Tenerife	Corina Mrazek González
Sevilla	Cynthia Carrasco Rosado
Tarragona	Ainhoa González Pérez
