= Villarrasa =

- Flag Coat of arms

- Location of Villarrasa in Spain
- Coordinates: 37°23′N 6°36′W
- Country: Spain
- Autonomous community: Andalusia
- Province: Huelva

Area
  - Total: 72 km^{2} (28 sq mi)
- Elevation: 75 m (246 ft)

Population (2025-01-01)
  - Total: 2,103
  - Density: 29/km^{2} (76/sq mi)
- Time zone: UTC+1 (CET)
  - Summer (DST): UTC+2 (CEST)
- Website: http://www.villarrasa.es/es/

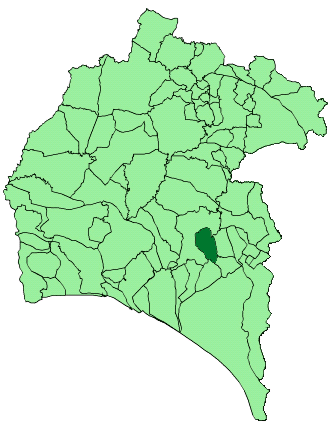
Map of Villarrasa, Huelva

Villarrasa is a town and a municipality at the same time. It is located in the province of Huelva, Spain. According to the 2005 census, it had a population of 2095 inhabitants and covers an area of 72 km^{2} (28 sq mi) (29.1 people/km^{2}). It sits at an altitude of 65 m (213 ft) above sea level, and is 37 km (23 mi) from the main capital.

== See also ==
- List of municipalities in Huelva
