= Miss Grand Spain 2019 =

4th edition of the Miss Grand Spain competition

- Date: 6 July 2019
- Venue: Hotel Campomar, Arnuero Cantabria
- Entrants: 32
- Placements: 14
- Debuts: Burgos; Costa Gallega; León; Mediterranean; Tarragona
- Withdrawals: Almería; Canarias; Cataluña; Ceuta; Costa de la Luz; Melilla; Murcia; Pontevedra; Salamanca; Toledo
- Returns: Cáceres; Cantabria
- Winner: Ainara de Santamaría (Cantabria)

External videos
- Grand final competition

Miss Grand Spain 2019 is the 4th edition of Miss Grand Spain beauty contest, held at Hotel Campomar, Arnuero Cantabria on 6 July 2019, and was won by Ainara de Santamaría of Cantabria.

Ainara represented Spain at the Miss Grand International 2019 pageant held on October 25 in Venezuela, and was placed among the top 20 finalists.

== Results ==
Final results	Contestant
Miss Grand Spain 2019	Cantabria – Ainara De Santamaría
1st Runner-up	Madrid – Andrea Ávila
2nd Runner-up	Jaén – Miriam Herrera Juan
3rd Runner-up	Cádiz – Guadalupe Alvarez
4th Runner-Up	Costa Gallega – Iris Miguélez
Top 10	Costa del Sol – Yaiza Cabello; Huelva – Ángela Gil Pinto; Islas Baleares – Sorina Dolghieru; León – Lucía Andrade; Zaragoza – Mariana D'orazio Gómez
Top 14	Andalucía – María José Parra; Asturias – Verónica Quirós; Granada – María Jesús Delgado Rosales; Sevilla – Nuria Rodríguez

== Contestants ==
32 delegates were selected by regional licensees to compete for title.

Represented	Contestant	Age	Hometown
Andalucía	María José Parra	19	Jódar
Asturias	Verónica Quirós	22	Asturias
Atlántico	Zulheika Jiménez	26	Las Palmas de Gran Canaria
Badajoz	Victoria Hernández	23	Villafranca de los Barros
Barcelona	Andrada Morar	22	Barcelona
Burgos	Alba Ortega	18	Burgos
Cádiz	Guadalupe Alvarez	18	La Línea de la Concepción
Cantabria	Ainara De Santamaría	23	Cantabria
Cáceres	Irene Simón	23	Zarza la Mayor
Ciudad Real	Alba Izquierdo	17	Miguelturra
Córdoba	María Salazar	24	Córdoba
Costa del Sol	Yaiza Cabello	21	Málaga
Costa Gallega	Iris Miguélez	21	Villa de Cruces
Extremadura	Paula Miralles	20	Cáceres
Galicia	Tania Chaves	21	Galicia
Granada	María Jesús Delgado Rosales	19	Granada
Huelva	Ángela Gil Pinto	17	La Palma del Condado
Islas Baleares	Sorina Dolghieru	18	Inca
Jaén	Miriam Herrera Juan	17	Úbeda
Las Palmas	Victoria María Contreras	26	Las Palmas de Gran Canaria
León	Lucía Andrade	18	León
Madrid	Andrea Ávila	17	Madrid
Málaga	Nabila Recio	25	Málaga
Mediterráneo	Maria Fernández	23	Palma de Mallorca
Navarra	Dana Vázquez	21	Bilbao
País Vasco	Zuriñe Ruiz	21	Indauchu
Palencia	Sara Prados		
Tenerife	Noelia Dorta Hernández	26	Santa Cruz de Tenerife
Sevilla	Nuria Rodríguez	17	Sevilla
Tarragona	Laia Bosquet	24	Tarragona
Valencia	Mariam Bustos	20	Valencia
Zaragoza	Mariana D’orazio Gómez	17	Zaragoza
