= Mairena del Alcor =

- Municipality
- Flag Coat of arms

- Location in Spain
- Coordinates: 37°22′N 5°44′W
- Country: Spain
- Autonomous community: Andalusia
- Province: Sevilla
- Comarca: Campiña de Carmona

Government
  - Mayor: Juan Manuel López Domínguez (PP)

Area
  - Total: 69.72 km^{2} (26.92 sq mi)
- Elevation: 135 m (443 ft)

Population (2025-01-01)
  - Total: 24,339
  - Density: 349.1/km^{2} (904.2/sq mi)
- Demonym(s): Mairenero, ra
- Time zone: UTC+1 (CET)
  - Summer (DST): UTC+2 (CEST)
- Postal code: 41510
- Website: Official website

Mairena del Alcor is a city located in the province of Seville, Spain. According to the 2020 census, the city has a population of 23698.

Located in the heart of the Los Alcores region, it is about 20 km from the national capital, Seville, and is well known for its oranges and flamenco music.

== History ==
=== Prehistory and classical antiquity ===
The area of Los Alcores was a settlement of ancient civilizations since prehistoric times. There are archeological sites that prove the continuous use of the area since the Upper Paleolithic. Later on, during Neolithic times, small villages settled to explore agricultural properties of the land. In addition, several artifacts from the Metal Ages have been found, such as megalithic tombs and ceramic items.

The treasure of 'Andres Morales', consisting of complex gold jewels, evidences the presence of Tartessians during the first millennium.

In later times, Phoenicians, Greeks, Turdetani, Romans, Visigoths and Arabs have inhabited the area.

=== Middle Ages ===
At the time Arabs ruled the region, a defensive tower was built, maybe as part of a surveillance belt, defense of communication across Los Alcores.

In the campaign of 1246, the village of Mairena was conquered by Castilian king Fernando III. On November 20, 1342, king Alfonso XI granted the estate of Mairena to Pedro Ponce de León, separating this from Carmona's jurisdiction. Since that time, the village has belonged to Casa de Arcos and a castle was built in the 14th century which promoted the development of a small town.

Not much later in 1441, the King Juan II conceded permission for the celebration of a livestock market, which continues as a traditional festival today.

=== Modern period ===
During the Renaissance, the town of Mairena underwent significant growth thanks to the Discovery of America and the transatlantic trades. Production of olive oil and cereals was increased, and the successful farming and taming of horses became an art.

== Demography ==
The first census dates from 1842 when the population was 3623.

Recent censuses measure the people officially established in Mairena del Alcor as follows:

Historical population
Year	Pop.	±%
2002	16,947	—
2004	17,623	+4.0%
2006	18,710	+6.2%
2008	19,924	+6.5%
2010	21,100	+5.9%
2012	22,024	+4.4%
2014	22,447	+1.9%
2016	23,047	+2.7%
2017	23,222	+0.8%
2018	23,473	+1.1%
2019	23,550	+0.3%
2020	23,698	+0.6%
Source: National Statistics Institute

== Governance ==
Local election results in Mairena del Alcor
Political Party	2023			2019			2015			2011			2007		
Political Party	%	Votes	Councillors	%	Votes	Councillors	%	Votes	Councillors	%	Votes	Councillors	%	Votes	Councillors
PP	49,39	5,754	11	43,13	4,883	11	43,59	4,727	10	35,36	4,021	8	19,08	1,864	3
PSOE	39,43	4,593	9	37,81	4,280	9	38,67	4,193	8	39,10	4,447	8	52,33	5,113	9
United Left (IU)	5,36	625	1	5,80	657	1	9,78	1,060	2	14,48	1,647	3	15,76	1,540	3
Partido Andalucista	—	—	—	—	—	—	5,72	620	1	8,70	989	2	11,44	1,118	2

== See also ==
- List of municipalities in Seville
