= Miss Grand Spain 2016 =

1st edition of the Miss Grand Spain competition

- Date: 18 July 2016
- Venue: Teatro de la Villa del Conocimiento y las Artes, Mairena del Alcor
- Entrants: 24
- Placements: 10
- Debuts: Albacete; Badajoz; Barcelona; Cáceres; Cádiz; Cantabria; Castellón; Ceuta; Ciudad Real; Córdoba; Granada; Guadalajara; Huelva; Islas Baleares; Jaén; Madrid; Málaga; Palencia; Salamanca; Santa Cruz de Tenerife; Sevilla; Toledo; Valencia; Valladolid
- Winner: Adriana Sánchez Rivas (Málaga)
- Photogenic: Leticia Burgos (Cantabria)

External videos
- Grand final

Miss Grand Spain 2016 is the 1st edition of Miss Grand Spain beauty contest, held at Teatro de la Villa del Conocimiento y las Artes, Mairena del Alcor on 18 July 2016.

The contest was won by Adriana Sánchez Rivas of Málaga, who then represented Spain at the Miss Grand International 2016 pageant held on 25 October in United States, and was placed among the top 20 finalists.

== Results ==
Final results	Contestant
Miss Grand Spain 2016	Málaga - Adriana Sánchez
1st Runner-Up	Salamanca - Susana Sánchez
2nd Runner-Up	Cantabria - Leticia Burgos
3rd Runner-Up	Sevilla - Cynthia Ruz
4th Runner-Up	Valencia - Lidia González Regolf
TOP 10	Castellón - Clara López; Granada - Elena Maya; Huelva - María Rocío Báñez Rubent; Islas Baleares - Aida Bravo; Palencia - Yurena Cárdenas Gutiérrez

=== Special awards ===
Award	Winner
Miss Best Elegance	Valencia - Lidia González Regolf
Miss Best Body	Málaga - Adriana Sánchez
Miss Popular Vote	Granada - Elena Maya
Miss Photogenic	Cantabria - Leticia Burgos

== Contestants ==
24 delegates were selected by regional licensees to compete for the title.

Represented	Contestant
Albacete	Coral Molina
Badajoz	Elena Navarro
Barcelona	Sandra Barreiro
Cáceres	Osiris Maria Piñero
Cádiz	Cristina Lorenzo
Cantabria	Leticia Burgos
Castellón	Clara López
Ceuta	Nuria de Torres
Ciudad Real	Ana Maria Urda
Córdoba	Inma Romero
Granada	Elena Maya
Guadalajara	Judit León
Huelva	María Rocío Báñez
Islas Baleares	Aida Bravo
Jaén	Celia Navarro
Madrid	Helen Escoriza
Málaga	Adriana Sánchez
Palencia	Yurena Cárdenas
Salamanca	Susana Sánchez
Santa Cruz de Tenerife	Gara Ramos Glez
Sevilla	Cynthia Ruz
Toledo	Beatriz Alba
Valencia	Lidia González Regolf
Valladolid	Zoraida Rodríguez
