= Miss Grand Spain 2024 =

8th edition of the Miss Grand Spain beauty pageant

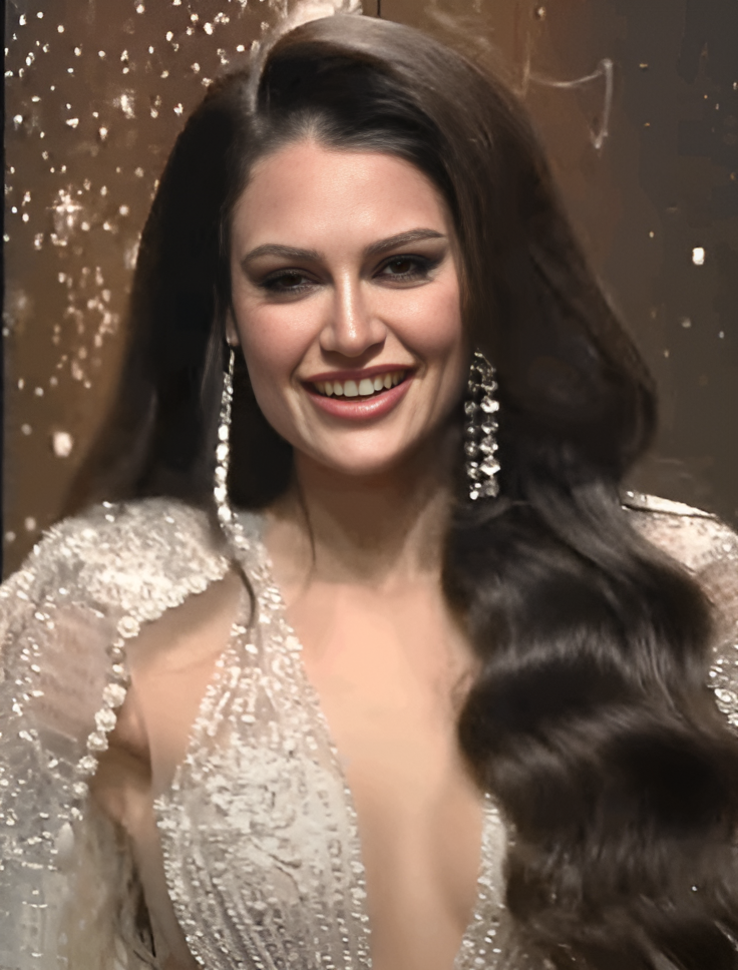
- Susana Medina, the winner of the contest
- Date: 11 May 2024
- Presenters: Pepe Del Real
- Venue: Teatro Municipal Horacio Noguera, Isla Cristina, Huelva
- Broadcaster: YouTube
- Entrants: 35
- Placements: 15
- Debuts: Albacete
- Withdrawals: Almería; Islas Afortunadas; Navarre
- Returns: Costa de la Luz; Mediterranean
- Winner: Susana Medina (Las Palmas)

External videos
- Miss Grand Spain 2024 Grand Final Competition, on 11 May 2024, YouTube video

Miss Grand Spain 2024 (Spanish: Miss Grand España 2024) was the eighth edition of the Miss Grand Spain pageant, held on 11 May 2024, at the Teatro Municipal Horacio Noguera, Isla Cristina, Huelva. Thirty-five candidates, who qualified for the national pageant through the provincial contests, competed for the title. Of whom, a 25-year-old programmer and Harvard University's labour law student representing the province of Las Palmas, Susana Medina, was elected the winner. Susana represented the country at the international parent stage, Miss Grand International 2024.

== Background ==
=== Date and venue ===
The Miss Grand Spain 2024 schedule was revealed in the press conference held on 4 March 2024, in Isla Cristina, Huelva, which was selected as the pageant's host city. The pageant was scheduled for 5–12 May 2024, with the preliminary and grand final rounds on 10 and 11 May, respectively, at the Teatro Municipal Horacio Noguera.

=== Selection of participants ===
The national finalists for Miss Grand Spain 2024 were determined by provincial licensees through their regional pageants, where in some cases the qualifiers for the national stage are more than one person per event. In the event of a lack of provincial licensees, the runner-up of another provincial contest was appointed as the representative.

The first runner-up of the Miss Grand Euskadi 2022 pageant was appointed as Asturias representative for this year's competition, while the representative of Extremadura was determined through an audition, no actual pageant held as previously done in 2023.

The following is a list of the provinces that held the preliminary contests for Miss Grand Spain 2024.

Color keys for the number of title qualified to the national pageant

1 pageant with 1 provincial title 1 pageant with 2 provincial titles No pageant held in the province	1 pageant with 3 provincial titles 1 pageant with 4 provincial titles

Number of		Host province	Title(s)	Total titles
Pageant	Title(s)	Host province	Title(s)	Total titles
1	4	Barcelona	Barcelona; Girona; Lleida; Tarragona	4
1	3	Madrid	Madrid; Madrid City (Note: Withdrew from the national competition); Toledo	3
1	2	Cádiz	Cádiz; Andalucía (Note: Appointed after being runner-up in the 2024 regional pageant)	18
1	2	Pontevedra	Galicia; Costa Gallega	18
1	2	Huelva	Huelva; Costa de la Luz	18
1	2	Balearic Islands	Balearic Islands; Mediterranean	18
1	2	Seville	Seville; Atlantico	18
1	2	Málaga	Málaga; Costa del Sol	18
1	2	Las Palmas	Las Palmas; Costa Canaria	18
1	2	Alicante	Alicante; Albacete	18
1	2	Córdoba	Córdoba; Ciudad Real	18
1	1	Álava	Euskadi	10
1	1	Cantabria; Granada; Jaén; La Rioja; Santa Cruz de Tenerife; Valencia; Zaragoza; Murcia; Castellón		10
Casting/Audition			Extremadura	1
Appointed			Asturias (Note: Appointed after being runner-up in the 2023 regional pageant)	1
Total titles				37

== Results ==
Miss Grand Spain 2024 competition result by province
Color keys:

Winner 1st runner-up 2nd runner-up 3rd runner-up 4th runner-up	Top 10 Top 15 Unplaced Withdrew No representative

Miss Grand Spain 2024 competition result
Placement	Contestant
Miss Grand Spain 2024	Las Palmas – Susana Medina
1st runner-up	Tenerife – Idayra Tena
2nd runner-up	Tarragona – Adriana Corpas
3rd runner-up	Albacete – Luana Gheban
4th runner-up	Euskadi – Esther Escudero
Top 10	Andalusia – María Llamas; Córdoba – Rocio Mengual; Mediterranean – Gema Adrover; Seville – Mayka Rodríguez; Toledo – Ainhoa Gallego
Top 15	Atlántico – Julia Guerrero; Castellón – Alina Farcas; Costa Canaria – Yaneisy Ceballos; La Rioja – Valentina Pereira; Murcia – Daniela Quintero
Special Awards
Miss Congeniality	Costa de la Luz – Noelia Rivero
Miss Popular Vote	Tarragona – Adriana Corpas
Miss Photogenic	Andalusia – María Llamas
Best Elegance	Murcia – Daniela Qiuntero
Best Dance	Tenerife – Idayra Tena
Best in Swimsuit	Tarragona – Adriana Corpas
Best Evening Gown	Seville – Mayka Rodríguez

== Contestants ==
Thirty-five candidates competed for the title.

- Albacete – Luana Gheban
- Alicante – Claudia Napoletano
- Andalucía – María Llamas
- Asturias – Clara Ocaña (withdrew)
- Atlántico – Julia Guerrero
- Barcelona – Susana Garcés
- Cádiz – Milene Montilla
- Cantabria – Zulema de la Paz
- (Castellón de la Plana) Castellón – Alina Farcas
- Ciudad Real – Ana López
- (Córdoba, Spain) Córdoba – Rocio Mengual
- Costa Canaria – Yaneisy Ceballos
- Costa de la Luz – Noelia Rivero
- Costa del Sol – Nika Kuznetsova
- Costa Gallega – Sheila Romay
- Euskadi – Esther Escudero
- Extremadura – Isabel Álvarez
- Galicia – Marcia Lukasievicz (Note: Originally crowned the 1st runner-up, but later was promoted to the title after the original winner, Paula Currás, resigned.)
- Girona – Nayeli Ortega
- Granada – Ángela Ortega
- Huelva – Alejandra Domínguez
- Islas Baleares – Aura González (Note: Originally crowned the 1st runner-up but later was promoted to the title after the original winner, Ndeye Fatou, resigned.)
- Jaén – Lucía Esteo
- Las Palmas – Susana Medina
- La Rioja – Valentina Pereira
- Lleida – Carla Demenech
- Madrid – Bianca Elena Ionescu (Note: As the replacement for the original winner, Alejandra Lafuente.)
- Madrid City – Irene Aguilera (withdrew)
- Málaga – Virginia Pelagia Nnang
- Mediterranean – Gema Adrover
- Murcia – Daniela Quintero
- Seville – Mayka Rodríguez
- Tenerife – Idayra Tena
- Tarragona – Adriana Corpas
- Toledo – Ainhoa Gallego
- Valencia – Itziar Martín
- Zaragoza – Leyre Escobedo
