= Miss Grand Spain 2023 =

8th Miss Grand Spain competition, beauty pageant edition

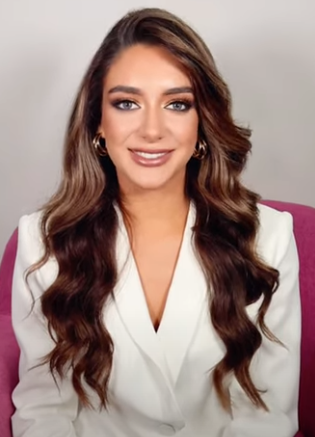
- Celia Sevilla, the winner of the contest
- Date: 25 March 2023
- Entertainment: WRS
- Venue: Centro Comercial Martiánez Shopping Mall, Puerto de la Cruz, Santa Cruz de Tenerife
- Broadcaster: YouTube
- Entrants: 34
- Placements: 15
- Withdrawals: Ciudad Real; Costa de la Luz; Costa Cantabrica
- Returns: Alicante; Castellón; Islas Baleares
- Winner: Celia Sevilla (Toledo)

External videos
- Miss Grand Spain 2023 Grand Final Competition, on 25 May 2023, YouTube video

Miss Grand Spain 2023 (Spanish: Miss Grand España 2023) was the seventh edition of the Miss Grand Spain beauty pageant. The event was held on 25 March 2023, at Centro Comercial Martiánez Shopping Mall in the tourism coastline city of the Province of Santa Cruz de Tenerife, Puerto de la Cruz, for the third year in a row, with the Canary Islands hosting the competition.

Thirty-four contestants who qualified for the national contest from the provincial competitions competed for the title, and a 22-year-old model from Toledo, Celia Sevilla González, was named the winner and obtained the right to represent the country at Miss Grand International 2023, which is scheduled to be held in Vietnam on 25 October.

The grand final round of the competition was highlighted by a live performance by a Romanian singer, Wrs, and was attended by Miss Grand International 2022, Isabella Menin of Brazil, as well as vice president of the MGI PLC, Teresa Chaivisut.

== Background ==
=== Location and date ===
On the grand final night of Miss Grand Spain 2022 contest, in addition to crowning the winner, the host of the event also announced that Puerto de la Cruz of the Santa Cruz de Tenerife will be served as the grand final venue of its succeeding edition, Miss Grand Spain 2023. A day after the 2022 coronation night, the president of Miss Grand Spain "Vicente Gonzalez" together with the vice-president of Miss Grand International Ltd. "Teresa Chaivisut" as well as Miss Grand International 2021 Nguyễn Thúc Thùy Tiên visit His Excellency Mayor of the City Council of Puerto de la Cruz "Marco Antonio Mesa" and the Councilor for Tourism Promotion, Roberto Medina, at the Costa Martiánez Tourist Complex to sign a memorandum of understanding (MOU) for hosting Miss Grand Spain 2023 in the city in March 2023.

List of the main events in the Miss Grand Spain 2023 pageant
Date	Event	Venue	Ref.
19 March	Official Press Conference	Precise Resort Tenerife, Puerto de la Cruz	
23 March	Swimsuit competition	Lago Martiánez, Puerto de la Cruz	
24 March	Preliminary competition	Centro Comercial Martiánez Shopping Mall, Puerto de la Cruz	
25 March	Grand Final Coronation	Centro Comercial Martiánez Shopping Mall, Puerto de la Cruz	

=== Selection of contestants ===
Map shows provinces that held the regional contest for Miss Grand Spain 2023
Color keys for the number of title qualified to the national pageant

1 provincial title 2 provincial titles No pageant held in the province	3 provincial titles 4 provincial titles

The national finalists for Miss Grand Spain 2023 were determined by provincial licensees through their regional pageants, where in some cases the qualifiers for the national stage are more than one person per event. Thirty-four province and autonomous community representatives competed for the title, 27 of which directly obtained the regional title at the subnational pageant, while six candidates were appointed to the position after finishing as the runners-up at the regional contest, including the representatives of Atlántico, Barcelona, Las Palmas, Costa Canaria, Navarre, and Islas Afortunadas.

Of the appointed contestants, two were assigned as the replacements for the original ones, including:

- Dayanara Rodriguez of Las Palmas was appointed as the replacement for the original winner, Ana Trujillo, who resigned from the title. Dayanara Rodriguez was the first runner-up of the Miss Grand Las Palmas 2022 pageant.
- Marta Rovira Mañé of Barcelona, who finished as the first runner-up at the provincial pageant, was appointed as the replacement for Eva Faife who withdrew for undisclosed reasons.

In the Province of Sevilla, at least two municipality pageants, such as Miss Grand Alcalá de Guadaíra and Miss Grand Capital, were held to determine the city's representative for the provincial pageant.

The following is a list of the provinces that held the preliminary contests for Miss Grand Spain 2023.

List of Miss Grand Spain 2023 Regional Pageants, by the coronation date
Host province	Level	Date & venue	Entrants	Title(s)	Ref.
Cantabria	Provincial	26 August 2022 at Concha Espina Municipal Theater, Torrelavega	26	1 title: Miss Grand Cantabria	
Toledo	Provincial	17 September 2022 at Teatro Lope De Vega, Ocaña	18	2 titles: Miss Grand Toledo; Miss Grand Madrid	
Badajoz	Autonomy	18 September 2022 at Teatro Carolina Coronado, Almendralejo	16	1 title: Miss Grand Extremadura	
Cádiz	Provincial	23 September 2022 at Juan Luis Galiardo Theater, San Roque	27	1 title: Miss Grand Cádiz	
Granada	Provincial	2 October 2022 at San Sebastián Park, Ogíjares	44	1 title: Miss Grand Granada	
Barcelona	Autonomy	12 November 2022 at Meliá Sitges Hotel, Sitges	31	4 titles: Miss Grand Barcelona; Miss Grand Girona; Miss Grand Lleida; Miss Grand Tarragona	
Castellón	Provincial	19 November 2022 at Real Casino Antiguo, Castellón de la Plana	10	1 title: Miss Grand Castellón	
Huelva	Provincial	20 November 2022 at Teatro España, La Palma del Condado	14	1 title: Miss Grand Huelva	
La Rioja	Provincial	26 November 2022 at Restaurante Barros, Lardero	13	1 title: Miss Grand La Rioja	
Tenerife	Provincial	27 November at the Teobaldo Power Performing Arts Centre, Villa de la Orotava	12	3 titles: Miss Grand Tenerife; Miss Grand Atlántico; Miss Grand Islas Afortunadas	
Zaragoza	Provincial	9 December 2022 at Teatro de las Esquinas, Delicias, Zaragoza	13	2 titles: Miss Grand Zaragoza; Miss Grand Navarre	
Las Palmas	Provincial	10 December 2022 at Nordotel Hotel, Las Palmas	12	2 titles: Miss Grand Las Palmas; Miss Grand Costa Canaria	
Jaén	Provincial	11 December 2022 at Jardines de la Almazara Restaurant, Mancha Real	17	1 title: Miss Grand Jaén	
Málaga	Provincial	16 December 2022 at Edgar Neville auditorium of the Diputación de Málaga	15	2 titles: Miss Grand Málaga; Miss Grand Costa del Sol	
Alicante	Provincial	18 December 2022 at Elitium Club Hípico, San Vicente del Raspeig	15	1 title: Miss Grand Alicante	
Valencia	Provincial	18 December 2022 at Medison Events Room, Valencia	14	1 title: Miss Grand Valencia	
Balearic Islands	Provincial	14 January 2023 at Valparaiso Palace & Spa, La Bonanova	14	1 title: Miss Grand Islas Baleares	
Seville	Provincial	14 January 2023 at Teatro de la Villa del Conocimiento y las Artes, Mairena del Alcor	20	2 titles: Miss Grand Seville; Miss Grand Andalucía	
Biscay	Autonomy	27 January 2023 at Sala Santana 27 event hall, Bilbao	21	1 title: Miss Grand Euskadi	
Córdoba	Provincial	5 February 2023 at Teatro El Brillante, Córdoba	28	1 title: Miss Grand Córdoba	
Murcia	Provincial	5 February 2023 at Hotel Sercotel Amistad Murcia, San Miguel, Murcia	14	1 title: Miss Grand Murcia	
Pontevedra	Autonomy	6 February 2023 at the Cultural and Sports Society Liceo Casino, Tui	11	2 titles: Miss Grand Galicia; Miss Grand Costa Gallega	
Almería	Provincial	24 February 2023 at the Municipal Theater of Macael, Macael	10	1 title: Miss Grand Almería	

== Results ==
=== Placements ===
Miss Grand Spain 2023 competition result by province
Color keys:

Winner 1st runner-up 2nd runner-up 3rd runner-up 4th runner-up	Top 10 Top 15 Unplaced Did not compete

Miss Grand Spain 2023 competition result
Placement	Contestant
Miss Grand Spain 2023	Toledo – Celia Sevilla
1st runner-up	La Rioja – Alejandra León
2nd runner-up	Tenerife – Carolina Barroso Pérez
3rd runner-up	Almería – Denisse Vivienne Andor
4th runner-up	Cantabria – Marina Edilla
Semifinalists (Top 10)	Andalucia - Cecilia Bellido; Costa Canaria - Sara Jane Cicero; Costa del Sol - Nuria González; Extremadura - Jara Bonito Ortega; Seville - Andrea Boza
Quarterfinalists (Top 15)	Córdoba - Pilar Espejo; Girona - Cristina López; Madrid – Faridi Dacasa; Málaga – Patricia Romero Reina; Murcia – Maria Moreno

=== Special awards ===
List of Miss Grand Spain 2023 special award winners
Award	Winner
Miss Popular Vote	Cantabria – Marina Edilla
Best in Swimsuit	La Rioja – Alejandra León

== Candidates ==
Thirty-four delegates competed for the title.

Provinces/Autonomies	Contestant	Age	Height	Ref.
Alicante	Yamila Heredia	17		
Almería	Denisse Vivienne Andor	27		
Andalucia	Cecilia Bellido	26		
Atlántico	Haridian Pérez Morales	24		
Barcelona	Marta Rovira Mañé	22		
Cádiz	Nuria Vela		1.70 m (5 ft 7 in)	
Cantabria	Marina Edilla	18		
Castellón	Nacary Rey Meneses	25	1.62 m (5 ft 4 in)	
Córdoba	Pilar Espejo	19	1.80 m (5 ft 11 in)	
Costa Canaria	Sara Jane Cicero	17		
Costa del Sol	Nuria González	22	1.78 m (5 ft 10 in)	
Costa Gallega	Nerea Casas	22		
Euskadi	Lorea Urkia			
Extremadura	Jara Bonito Ortega	19	1.77 m (5 ft 9 1/2 in)	
Galicia	Nuria Méndez			
Girona	Cristina López	28		
Granada	Marta Guarnido			
Huelva	Lucía Fábregas	19	1.71 m (5 ft 7 1/2 in)	
Islas Afortunadas	Daniela González Delgado	24		
Islas Baleares	Marina Vich Moll	19	1.67 m (5 ft 5 1/2 in)	
Jaén	Alba Hayas			
La Rioja	Alejandra León	17		
Las Palmas	Dayanara Rodriguez	20|		
Lleida	Sonia Castro			
Madrid	Faridi Dacasa	22	1.68 m (5 ft 6 in)	
Málaga	Patricia Romero Reina	21		
Murcia	Maria Moreno			
Navarre	Nerea Moreno	26	1.75 m (5 ft 9 in)	
Seville	Andrea Boza			
Tarragona	Ainara Sánchez	21	1.70 m (5 ft 7 in)	
Tenerife	Carolina Barroso Pérez	25	1.78 m (5 ft 10 in)	
Toledo	Celia Sevilla	22	1.73 m (5 ft 8 in)	
Valencia	Maria Rojas	18		
Zaragoza	Lara Gil Barranco	24		
