= List of venerated couples =

The following is a list of modern-day couples recognized by various Christian denominations to have lived such an exemplary holy lives in marriage and are under the process for canonization.

== Catholic Church ==
=== Under canonization process ===
Husband				Wife				Diocese
Portrait	Name	Born	Died	Portrait	Name	Born	Died	Diocese
	St. Isidro Merlo Quintana	c. 1070 (or 1082); Madrid, Spain	15 May 1130; Madrid, Spain		Bl. Maria Torribia de la Cabeza Merlo	? Caraquiz, Guadalajara, Spain	c. 1175; Torrelaguna, Madrid, Spain	Archdiocese of Madrid
	Bl. Ludwig Ludovingian	28 October 1200; Creuzburg, Thuringia, Germany	11 September 1227; Otranto, Lecce, Italy		St. Elisabeth von Thüringen	7 July 1207; Bratislava, Slovakia	17 November 1231; Marburg, Hesse, Germany	Archdiocese of Esztergom–Budapest
	Bl. Luchesio Modestini	c. 1180; Gaggiano, Milan, Italy	28 April 1260; Poggibonsi, Siena, Italy		Bl. Bounadonna de Segni Modestini	c. 1181; Italy	28 April 1260; Poggibonsi, Siena, Italy	Archdiocese of Siena
	Servant of God; Alfonso Sanches	24 May 1289; Ribeira de Pena, Portugal	2 November 1329; Escalona, Toledo, Spain		Servant of God; Teresa Martins de Menezes Telo Sanches	c. 1290; Portugal	c. 1350; Vila do Conde, Portugal	Archdiocese of Braga
	Servant of God; Claude-Toussaint Marot de La Garaye	30 October 1675; Rennes, Ille-et-Vilaine, France	2 July 1755; Taden, Côtes-d'Armor, France		Servant of God; Marguerite-Marie Piquet de la Motte de La Garaye	24 December 1681; Vannes, Morbihan, France	20 June 1757; Taden, Côtes-d'Armor, France	Saint-Brieuc et Tréguier
	Ven. Carlo Tancredi Falletti di Barolo	26 October 1782; Turin, Italy	4 September 1838; Chiari, Brescia, Italy		Ven. Giulia Vittorina Colbert Falletti di Barolo	26 June 1876; Maulévrier, Vendée, France	19 January 1864; Turin, Italy	Archdiocese of Turin
	Ven. Pierre Toussaint	prob. 27 June 1766 (or 1780); Saint-Marc, Artibonite, France	30 June 1853; New York City, New York, United States		Servant of God; Juliette Noel Toussaint	c. 1786; Saint-Domingue (now Haiti)	14 May 1851; New York City, New York, United States	Archdiocese of New York
	Bl. Antoine-Frédéric Ozanam	23 April 1813; Milan, Italy	8 September 1853; Marseille, Bouches-du-Rhône, France		Servant of God; Marie-Josephine-Amélie Soulacroix	11 August 1820; Marseille, Bouches-du-Rhône, France	26 September 1894; Écully, Lyon, France	Archdioceses of Paris and Marseille
	St. Louis Joseph Martin	22 August 1823; Bordeaux, Gironde, France	29 July 1894; Arnières-sur-Iton, Eure, France		St. Marie-Azélie Guérin Martin	23 December 1831; Saint-Denis-sur-Sarthon, Orne, France	28 August 1877; Alençon, Orne, France	Dioceses of Séez and Bayeux-Lisieux
	Servant of God; Francisco Armida García	17 March 1854; Monterrey, Nuevo León, Mexico	17 September 1901; Mexico City, Mexico		Bl. María Concepción Cabrera Arias de Armida	8 December 1862; San Luis Potosí, Mexico	3 March 1937; Mexico City, Mexico	Archdiocese of Mexico
	Servant of God; Jerônimo de Castro Abreu Magalhães	26 July 1851; Magé, Rio de Janeiro, Brazil	12 August 1909; Carmo, Rio de Janeiro, Brazil		Servant of God; Zélia (Elisa) Pedreira Abreu Magalhães	5 April 1857; Ingá, Niterói, Rio de Janeiro, Brazil	8 September 1919; Largo do Machado, Catete, Rio de Janeiro, Brazil	Archdiocese of São Sebastião do Rio de Janeiro
	Bl. Karl I (IV) von Österreich	17 August 1887; Persenbeug-Gottsdorf, Melk, Austria	1 April 1922; Funchal, Madeira, Portugal		Servant of God; Zita of Bourbon-Parma	9 May 1892; Capezza Pianore, Lucca, Italy	14 March 1989; Zizers, Graubünden, Switzerland	Archdiocese of Vienna and Diocese of Le Mans
	St. Bartolo Longo	11 February 1841; Latiano, near Brindisi, Italy	5 October 1926; Pompei, Ancona, Italy		Servant of God; Marianna Farnararo de Fusco Longo	13 December 1836; Monopoli, Bari, Italy	9 February 1924; Pompei, Ancona, Italy	Territorial Prelature of Pompei
	Servant of God; Nicolás Pakarati Urepotahi	1860 in Mataveri, Easter Island, Valparaíso, Chile	12 October 1927; Hanga Roa, Easter Island, Valparaíso, Chile		Servant of God; Elisabeth Marohania Kagitaki Ragitake Urepotahi	November 1869; Fangatau, Tuamoto Island, French Polynesia	2 October 1949; Hanga Roa, Easter Island, Valparaíso, Chile	Diocese of Villarrica (Chile)
	Bl. László Batthyány-Strattmann	28 October 1870; Dunakiliti, Győr-Moson-Sopron, Hungary	22 January 1931; Vienna, Austria		Servant of God; Mária Terézia Coreth Batthyány-Strattmann	10 November 1874; Vienna, Austria	14 March 1951; Vienna, Austria	Diocese of Szombathely and Archdiocese of Vienna
	Servant of God; Karol Wojtyła	18 July 1879; Lipnik, Bielsko-Biała, Poland	18 February 1941; Kraków, Poland		Servant of God; Emilia Kaczorowska Wojtyła	26 March 1884; Kraków, Poland	13 April 1929; Wadowice, Poland	Archdiocese of Kraków
	Servant of God; Giovanni Gheddo	22 April 1900; Viancino, Vercelli, Italy	17 December 1942 at the Don River basin, Volgogradskaya oblast', Russia		Servant of God; Rosetta Franzi Gheddo	3 December 1902; Crova, Vercelli, Italy	26 October 1934; Tronzano Vercellese, Vercelli, Italy	Archdiocese of Vercelli
	Servant of God; Eugenio Balmori Martínez	7 July 1900; San Luis Potosí, Mexico	14 May 1946; Minatitlán, Veracruz, Mexico		Servant of God; Marina Francisca Cinta Sarrelangue de Balmori	9 March 1909; Acayucan, Veracruz, Mexico	29 September 1988; Mexico City, Mexico	Diocese of Coatzacoalcos
	Servant of God; Louis Wandete [Ouandete]	c. 1877 northern Côte d'Ivoire	2 March 1949; Korhogo, Savanes, Côte d'Ivoire		Servant of God; Valérie Ama Wandete [Ouandete]	c. 1883; Krinjabo, Sud-Comoé, Côte d'Ivoire	17 December 1948; Korhogo, Savanes, Côte d’Ivoire	Archdiocese of Korhogo
	Servant of God; Félix Leseur	22 March 1861; Reims, Marne, France	27 February 1950; Paris, France		Servant of God; Pauline-Élisabeth Arrighi Leseur	16 October 1866; Paris, France	3 May 1914; Paris, France	Archdiocese of Paris
	Servant of God; Paulus Takashi Nagai	3 February 1908; Matsue, Shimane, Japan	1 May 1951; Nagasaki, Japan		Servant of God; Marina Moriyama Midori	8 October 1908; Urakami, Nagasaki, Japan	9 August 1945; Urakami, Nagasaki, Japan	Archdiocese of Nagasaki and Vicariate of Rome
	Bl. Luigi Beltrame Quattrochi	12 January 1880; Catania, Italy	9 November 1951; Rome, Italy		Bl. Maria Corsini Beltrame Quattrochi	24 June 1884; Florence, Italy	26 August 1965; Serravalle, Bibbiena, Arezzo, Italy	Vicariate of Rome
	Servant of God; Manuel Casesnoves Soler	30 June 1904; Xàtiva, Valencia, Spain	24 May 1958; Xàtiva, Valencia, Spain		Servant of God; Adela Soldevila Galiana de Casesnoves	5 May 1906; Xàtiva, Valencia, Spain	3 March 1988; Xàtiva, Valencia, Spain	Archdiocese of Valencia (Spain)
	Ven. Enrique Ernesto Shaw	26 February 1921; Paris, France	27 August 1962; Buenos Aires, Argentina		Servant of God; Cecilia Bunge de Shaw	13 May 1921; Buenos Aires, Argentina	23 May 2007; Buenos Aires, Argentina	Archdiocese of Buenos Aires
	Ven. Sergio Bernardini	20 May 1882; Sassoguidano, Modena, Italy	12 October 1966; Verica, Modena, Italy		Ven. Domenica Bedonni Bernardini	12 April 1889; Verica, Modena, Italy	27 February 1971; Verica, Modena, Italy	Archdiocese of Modena–Nonantola
	Servant of God; Georges-Philias Vanier	23 April 1888; Montréal, Québec, Canada	5 March 1967; Ottawa, Canada		Servant of God; Pauline Archer-Vanier	17 March 1902; Auzits, Aveyron, France	23 March 1991; Trosly-Breuil, Oise, France	Archdiocese of Ottawa
	Servant of God; Ulisse Amendolagine	14 May 1893; Salerno, Italy	30 May 1969; Rome, Italy		Servant of God; Lelia Cossidente Amendolagine	4 May 1893; Potenza, Italy	3 July 1951; Rome, Italy	Vicariate of Rome
	Servant of God; Edmond Michelet	8 October 1889; Paris, France	9 October 1970; Marcillac-la-Croisille, Corrèze, France		Servant of God; Marie Michelet née Vialle	25 January 1900; Brive-la-Gaillarde, Corrèze, France	1 September 1989; Marcillac-la-Croisille, Corrèze, France	Diocese of Tulle
	Servant of God; Edward Joseph Doherty	30 October 1890; Chicago, Illinois, United States	4 May 1975; Combermere, Ontario, Canada		Servant of God; Catherine De Hueck Doherty	15 August 1896; Nizhny Novgorod, Nizhegorodskaya oblast', Russia	14 December 1985; Combermere, Ontario, Canada	Diocese of Pembroke
	Servant of God; Fernando Crespo Alfageme	1 June 1907; León, Spain	7 January 1976; León, Spain		Servant of God; María Lourdes de Miguel Crespo de Crespo	11 February 1913; Sahagún, León, Spain	28 February 1983; León, Spain	Personal Prelature of the Holy Cross and Opus Dei
	Servant of God; Raoul Follereau	17 August 1903; Nevers, Nièvre, France	6 December 1977; Paris, France		Servant of God; Madeleine Follereau née Boudou	17 March 1902; Auzits, Aveyron, France	3 March 1991; Ville d'Avray, Hauts-de-Seine, France	Archdiocese of Paris
	Servant of God; Settimio Manelli	25 April 1886; Teramo, Italy	26 April 1978; Rome, Italy		Servant of God; Licia Gualandris Manelli	13 July 1907; Nembro, Bergamo, Italy	18 January 2004; Rome, Italy	Vicariate of Rome
	Servant of God; Eduardo Ortiz de Landázuri Fernández de Heredia	31 October 1910; Segovia, Spain	20 May 1985; Pamplona, Navarra, Spain		Servant of God; Laura Busca Otaegui de Ortiz de Landázuri	3 November 1918; Zumárraga, Guipúzcoa, Spain	11 October 2000; Pamplona, Navarra, Spain	Personal Prelature of the Holy Cross and Opus Dei
	Servant of God; Aristides Calvani Silva	19 January 1918; Port-of-Spain, Trinidad and Tobago	18 January 1986 at the Petén forest, Guatemala		Servant of God; Adela Rina Abbo Fontana de Calvani	2 December 1919; Cúcuta, Lara, Venezuela	18 January 1986 at the Petén forest, Guatemala	Archdiocese of Caracas
	Servant of God; Abraham Reyes Díaz	16 March 1917; Siquisique, Lara, Venezuela	6 September 1988; Caracas, Venezuela		Servant of God; María Patricia García García de Reyes	24 August 1924; Aragüita, Acevedo, Miranda, Venezuela	15 February 2006; Monte Piedad, Catia, Caracas, Venezuela	Archdiocese of Caracas
	Servant of God; Baudouin of Belgium	7 September 1930; Laeken, Brussels, Belgium	31 July 1993; Motril, Granada, Spain		Fabiola Fernanda de Mora Aragón	11 June 1928; Madrid, Spain	5 December 2014; Laeken, Brussels, Belgium	Archdiocese of Mechelen–Brussels
	Servant of God; Tomás Alvira y Alvira	17 January 1906; Villanueva de Gállego, Zaragoza, Spain	7 May 1992; Madrid, Spain		Servant of God; Francisca [Paquita] Domínguez Susín de Alvira	1 April 1912; Borau, Huesca, Spain	29 August 1994; Madrid, Spain	Personal Prelature of the Holy Cross and Opus Dei
	Servant of God; Marcello Inguscio	26 June 1934; Lecce, Italy	2 January 1996; Catania, Italy		Servant of God; Anna Maria Ritter Inguscio	23 August 1938; Catania, Italy	2 January 1986; Catania, Italy	Archdiocese of Catania
	Servant of God; Francesco Bono	9 February 1939; Lamezia Terme, Catanzaro, Italy	24 April 1996; Catanzaro, Italy		Servant of God; Maria Rosaria de Angelis Bono	7 October 1955; Locri, Reggio Calabria, Italy	24 December 2000; Locri, Reggio Calabria, Italy	Diocese of Locri-Gerace
	Servant of God; Aldo Michisanti	1 December 1937; Rome, Italy	3 March 1997; Rome, Italy		Servant of God Enrica Onorante Michisanti	19 November 1945; Rome, Italy	25 January 2007; Rome, Italy	Vicariate of Rome
	Servant of God; Francesco Ugenti	28 July 1913; Toritto, Bari, Italy	7 November 1998; Grumo Appula, Bari, Italy		Servant of God; Teresa Sivilli Ugenti	9 April 1913; Grumo Appula, Bari, Italy	21 May 1984; Rome, Italy	Archdiocese of Bari-Bitonto and Vicariate of Rome
	Servant of God; Henry Casolani	25 November 1917; Valletta, Malta	29 December 1999; Valletta, Malta		Servant of God; Inez Vassallo Casolani	11 October 1915; Cospicua, Malta	13 July 1992; Valletta, Malta	Archdiocese of Malta
	Servant of God; Pietro Molla	1 July 1912; Mesero, Milan, Italy	3 April 2010; Mesero, Milan, Italy		St. Gianna Beretta Molla	4 October 1922; Magenta, Milan, Italy	28 April 1962; Magenta, Milan, Italy	Archdiocese of Milan
	Servant of God; Consilio Pistocchi	23 April 1937; Polenta di Bertinoro, Forlì-Cesena, Italy	19 September 2012; Cesena, Forlì-Cesena, Italy		Servant of God; Bruna Buratti Pistocchi	1 June 1945; Martorano, Cesena, Forlì-Cesena, Italy	9 November 2010; Cesena, Forlì-Cesena, Italy	Diocese of Cesena-Sarsina
	Servant of God; Daniel George Hyams	1 June 1921; Jeppestown, Johannesburg, South Africa	28 December 2012; Edenvale, Ekurhuleni, Gauteng, South Africa		Servant of God; Maria Domitilla Rota Hyams	7 May 1918; Albenza di Almenno San Bartolomeo, Bergamo, Italy	18 January 2011; Edenvale, Ekurhuleni, Gauteng, South Africa	Archdiocese of Johannesburg

=== Martyred couples ===
Husband				Wife				Diocese
Portrait	Name	Born	Died	Portrait	Name	Born	Died	Diocese
Couples killed during the Spanish Civil War (1934, 36–39)
	Bl. Francisco de Paula Ortega Montilla	29 August 1868; Puente Genil, Córdoba, Spain	23 July 1936; Puente Genil, Córdoba, Spain		Bl. María Antonia Vergara Melgar de Ortega	9 May 1867; Puente Genil, Córdoba, Spain	23 July 1936; Puente Genil, Córdoba, Spain	Diocese of Córdoba
	Servant of God; Manuel Marín Portela	? Adanero, Ávila, Spain	12 August 1936; Pozo del Tío Raimundo, Vallecas, Madrid, Spain		Servant of God; Teresa Basulto Jiménez de Marín	? Adanero, Ávila, Spain	12 August 1936; Pozo del Tío Raimundo, Vallecas, Madrid, Spain	Diocese of Jaén
	Bl. Isidoro Fernández Rubio	4 April 1887; Villaralto, Córdoba, Spain	16 August 1936; Villaralto, Córdoba, Spain		Bl. Isidra Fernández Palomero de Fernández	15 May 1893; Villaralto, Córdoba, Spain	16 August 1936; Villaralto, Córdoba, Spain	Diocese of Córdoba
	Servant of God; Gabino Díaz-Toledo Martín-Macho	1897; Mora, Toledo, Spain	21 August 1936; Orgaz, Toledo, Spain		Servant of God; María Paz Pascuala Merchán Gouvert de Díaz-Toledo	19 May 1897; Consuegra, Toledo, Spain	21 August 1936; Orgaz, Toledo, Spain	Archdiocese of Toledo
	Servant of God; Moisés Méndez-Benegassi García-Mora	25 November 1894; Castuera, Badajoz, Spain	27 August 1936; Zalamea de la Serena, Badajoz, Spain		Servant of God; María Luisa Sánchez-Arévalo García-Mora de Méndez-Benegassi	3 September 1888; Cabeza del Buey, Badajoz, Spain	27 August 1936; Zalamea de la Serena, Badajoz, Spain	Archdiocese of Mérida-Badajoz
	Servant of God; José Carné Moreno	? Tarancón, Cuenca, Spain	29 August 1936 in Almonacid del Marquesado, Cuenca, Spain		Servant of God; María Dolores Gómez Plaza de Carné	? Tarancón, Cuenca, Spain	29 August 1936 in Almonacid del Marquesado, Cuenca, Spain	Diocese of Cuenca
	Servant of God; Plàcid Armengol Ceranova	1873; Guissona, Lleida, Spain	24 September 1936 at the L’Arrabassada highway, Barcelona, Spain		Servant of God; Emília Serra Saura de Armengol	24 January 1889; Montferrer i Castellbò, Lleida, Spain	24 September 1936 at the L’Arrabassada highway, Barcelona, Spain	Archdiocese of Barcelona
Couples killed in odium fidei by the Nazis during the Second World War (1939–45)
	Servant of God; Jožef Mavsar	22 February 1891; Šentrupert, Slovenia	27 December 1942; Šentrupert, Slovenia		Servant of God; Terezija Bukovec Mavsar	2 December 1893; Praproče, Koper, Slovenia	27 December 1942; Šentrupert, Slovenia	Diocese of Novo Mesto
	Servant of God; Fritz Siegfried Bing	12 December 1882; Nuremberg, Bavaria, Germany	30 September 1942; KZ Auschwitz-Birkenau, Oświęcim, Poland		Servant of God; Margarethe Hachenburg Bing	10 May 1890; Mannheim, Baden-Württemberg, Germany	30 September 1942; KZ Auschwitz-Birkenau, Oświęcim, Poland	Archdiocese of Freiburg im Breisgau
	Servant of God; Bernhard Kreulich	13 January 1890; Kray, Essen, Germany	17 March 1944; Plötzensee Prison, Berlin, Germany		Servant of God; Maria Budziak Kreulich	5 October 1889; Kray, Essen, Germany	19 March 1944; Plötzensee Prison, Berlin, Germany	Diocese of Essen
	Bl. Józef Ulma	2 March 1900; Markowa, Łańcut, Poland	24 March 1944; Markowa, Łańcut, Poland		Bl. Wiktoria Niemczak Ulma	10 December 1912; Markowa, Łańcut, Poland	24 March 1944; Markowa, Łańcut, Poland	Archdiocese of Przemyśl of the Latins
	Servant of God; František Munk	25 September 1895; Reca, Senec, Slovakia	21 or 22 April 1945; Neuruppin, Ostprignitz-Ruppin, Germany		Servant of God; Gizela Munková	23 October 1900; Lučenec, Slovakia	March–April 1945; KZ Bergen-Belsen, Celle, Germany	Archdiocese of Bratislava
Couples killed in odium fidei by Communist Regimes in Eastern Europe
	Servant of God; Martin Schmaltz	1872; Lymanske, Rozdilna, Odesa, Ukraine	9 August 1937; Odesa, Ukraine		Servant of God; Barbara Schmaltz	1899; Lymanske, Rozdilna, Odesa, Ukraine	28 November 1937; Odesa, Ukraine	Diocese of Odesa-Simferopol
	Servant of God; Avhustyn-Klement Tsebrovs'kyi	4 February 1888; Romanove Selo, Ternopil, Ukraine	21 March 1944 near Lopushna, Lviv and in Cherepin, Lviv, Ukraine		Servant of God; Oleksandra Pehle Tsebrovs'ka	June 1898; Tovschiv, Lviv, Ukraine	21 March 1944 near Lopushna, Lviv and in Cherepin, Lviv, Ukraine	Archeparchy of Lviv of the Ukrainians
	Servant of God; Teodor Nimylovych	1889; Drohobych, Lviv, Ukraine	25 October 1947; Unyatychi, Drohobych, Lviv, Ukraine		Servant of God; Olha Kapko Nimylovych	? Ukraine	25 October 1947; Unyatychi, Drohobych, Lviv, Ukraine	Archeparchy of Lviv of the Ukrainians
	Servant of God; Anatolii Hurhula	15 July 1905; Tomashivtsi, Kalush, Ivano-Frankivsk, Ukraine	27 February 1980; Tomashivtsi, Kalush, Ivano-Frankivsk, Ukraine		Servant of God; Irina Durbak Hurhula	1908; Burkaniv, Terebovlia, Ternopil, Ukraine	27 February 1980; Tomashivtsi, Kalush, Ivano-Frankivsk, Ukraine	Archeparchy of Lviv and Ivano-Frankivsk of the Ukrainians
Couples killed by organized crimes in Italy
	Carlo Alberto dalla Chiesa	27 September 1920; Saluzzo, Cuneo, Italy	3 September 1982; Palermo, Italy		Emanuela Setti Carraro dalla Chiesa	9 October 1950; Borgosesia, Vercelli, Italy	3 September 1982; Palermo, Italy	Archdiocese of Palermo
Couples killed during Nicaraguan Contra War (1979–90)
	Felipe Barreda Rodríguez	12 April 1931; Murra, Nueva Segovia, Nicaragua	3 January 1983; San Francisco de La Lodosa, El Paraíso, Nicaragua		María Eugenia García de Barreda	15 May 1933; Managua, Nicaragua	3 January 1983; San Francisco de La Lodosa, El Paraíso, Nicaragua	Diocese of Estelí
Couples killed during Rwandan Civil War (1990–94)
	Servant of God; Cyprien [Sipiriyani] Rugamba	c. 1932; Cyanika, Nyamagabe, Rwanda	7 April 1994; Kigali, Rwanda		Servant of God; Daphrose [Daforoza] Mukasanga	c. 1944; Ngoma, Cyanika, Nyamagabe, Rwanda	7 April 1994; Kigali, Rwanda	Archdiocese of Kigali
Couples killed in odium fidei at the 2010 Baghdad church massacre
	Servant of God; Jān Yūnān Kūrkīs Al-sāʻūr	29 July 1982; Bartella, Mosul, Iraq	31 October 2010; Baghdad, Iraq		Servant of God; Rītā Matī Kūrkīs Zūrā (Al-sāʻūr)	18 December 1988; Iraq	31 October 2010; Baghdad, Iraq	Archeparchy of Baghdad of the Syrians
	Servant of God; Thāmir Kāmel Āwsy	1 July 1955; Mosul, Iraq	31 October 2010; Baghdad, Iraq		Servant of God; Nida' Ḩamid Esţfān Ḩanā Balbūl (Āwsy)	25 February 1957; Bassura, Basra, Iraq	31 October 2010; Baghdad, Iraq	Archeparchy of Baghdad of the Syrians
	Servant of God; Basām ʻAdnān Jamīl Al-khūrī	29 July 1976; Iraq	31 October 2010; Baghdad, Iraq		Servant of God; Mīlad Nizār Jamīl Matlūb (Al-khūrī)	16 December 1984; Iraq	31 October 2010; Baghdad, Iraq	Archeparchy of Baghdad of the Syrians

=== Considered for sainthood ===
Husband				Wife				Diocese
Portrait	Name	Born	Died	Portrait	Name	Born	Died	Diocese
	Joseph Chiwatenhwa	c. 1602; Quebec, Canada	2 August 1640; Montreal, Quebec, Canada in odium fidei		Marie Aonetta	? Quebec, Canada	c. 1650; Quebec, Canada	Archdiocese of Quebec
	Antonio Brignole Sale	22 May 1786; Genoa, Italy	14 October 1863; Genoa, Italy		Artemisia Negrone Brignole-Sale	1787; Italy	1865; Genoa, Italy	Archdiocese of Genoa
	François Soubirous	7 July 1807; Lourdes, Hautes-Pyrénées, France	4 May 1871; Lourdes, Hautes-Pyrénées, France		Louise Casterot Soubirous	28 September 1825; Lourdes, Hautes-Pyrénées, France	8 December 1866; Lourdes, Hautes-Pyrénées, France	Diocese of Tarbes-et-Lourdes
	Alessandro Francesco Manzoni	7 March 1785; Milan, Italy	22 May 1873; Milan, Italy		Enrichetta Blondel Manzoni	11 July 1791; Casirate d'Adda, Bergamo, Italy	25 December 1833; Milan, Italy	Archdiocese of Milan
	Domenico Fassati	1804; Casale Monferrato, Alessandria, Italy	1878; Turin, Italy		Maria De Maistre Fassati	1824; Turin, Italy	1905; Turin, Italy	Archdiocese of Turin
	Thomas Poynton	11 March 1803; Ballivor, Ireland	9 March 1892; Takapuna, Auckland, New Zealand		Mary Kennedy Poynton	5 June 1812; Sydney, New South Wales, Australia	15 October 1891; Takapuna, Auckland, New Zealand	Archdiocese of Wellington and Diocese of Auckland
	Michele Alberione	17 July 1837; Cuneo, Italy	26 November 1904; San Lorenzo di Fossano, Cuneo, Italy		Teresa Rosa Allocco Alberione	7 June 1850; Cuneo, Italy	13 June 1903; San Lorenzo di Fossano, Cuneo, Italy	Diocese of Alba Pompeia
	Maurice de Blic	18 July 1828; Échalot, Côte-d'Or, France	29 October 1904; Beaune, Côte-d'Or, France		Marguerite Sophie de Blic née de Gravier	14 October 1833; Lyon, France	13 November 1921; Beaune, Côte-d'Or, France	Archdiocese of Dijon
	Nikollë Bojaxhiu	c. 1874; Prizren, Kosovo	2 August 1919; Skopje, North Macedonia		Dranafile (Drana) Bernai Bojaxhiu	c. 1889; Gjakova, Kosovo	1972; Skopje, North Macedonia	Diocese of Skopje
	Ignacio Lacson Arroyo	28 July 1851; Molo, Iloilo, Philippines	8 January 1935; Molo, Iloilo, Philippines		Maria Regalado Pidal de Arroyo	15 September 1860; Molo, Iloilo, Philippines	16 January 1920; Molo, Iloilo, Philippines	Archdiocese of Jaro
	Joseph Ratzinger Sr.	6 March 1877; Winzer, Deggendorf, Bavaria, Germany	25 August 1959; Traunstein, Bavaria, Germany		Maria Peintner Ratzinger	8 January 1884; Mühlbach, Upper Palatinate, Bavaria, Germany	16 December 1963; Traunstein, Bavaria, Germany	Archdiocese of Munich and Freising
	Juan de Dios Paras Nepomuceno	8 March 1892; Angeles, Pampanga, Philippines	22 April 1973; Angeles, Pampanga, Philippines		Clara Teresa Teodora Pamintuan Gomez de Nepomuceno	12 August 1893; Santo Tomas, Pampanga, Philippines	8 April 1970; Angeles, Pampanga, Philippines	Archdiocese of San Fernando
	Jacques Maritain	18 November 1882; Paris, France	28 April 1973; Toulouse, Haute-Garonne, France		Raïssa Oumansoff Maritain	31 August 1883; Rostov-on-Don, Rostov oblast', Russia	4 November 1960; Paris, France	Archdiocese of Paris
	Oskar Schindler	28 April 1908; Svitavy, Czech Republic	9 October 1974; Hildesheim, Lower Saxony, Germany		Emilie Pelzl Schindler	22 October 1907; Maletín, Šumperk, Czech Republic	5 October 2001; Strausberg, Brandenburg, Germany	Archdiocese of Berlin
	Fritz Spieler	26 September 1893; Mitlödi, Glarus Süd, Switzerland	8 July 1974; Greibenhof, Solothurn, Switzerland		Hilda Spieler-Meyer	17 January 1896; Switzerland	7 April 1953; Greibenhof, Solothurn, Switzerland	Diocese of Basel
	Patrick Francis Crowley	23 September 1911; Chicago, Illinois, United States	20 November 1974; Chicago, Illinois, United States		Patricia Caron Crowley	24 July 1913; Chicago, Illinois, United States	28 November 2005; Wilmette, Illinois, United States	Archdiocese of Chicago
	William Gauchat	31 July 1907; Dayton, Ohio, United States	16 April 1975; Avon, Ohio, United States		Dorothy Helen Schmitt Gauchat	22 February 1961; Cleveland, Ohio, United States	20 February 2000; Westlake, Ohio, United States	Diocese of Cleveland
	Dietrich von Hildebrand	12 October 1889; Florence, Italy	26 January 1977; New Rochelle, New York, United States		Alice Marie Jourdain von Hildebrand	11 March 1923; Brussels, Belgium	14 January 2022; New Rochelle, New York, United States	Archdiocese of New York
	Ananias Abnegado Vasconcelos Arruda	23 May 1886; Aracatiaçu, Sobral, Ceará, Brazil	26 January 1980; Fortaleza, Ceará, Brazil		Ana Custódio dos Santos Arruda [Donaninha]	31 July 1895; Sobral, Ceará, Brazil	19 January 1941; Pacoti, Ceará, Brazil	Archdiocese of Fortaleza
	Francis Joseph Sheed	20 March 1897; Sydney, New South Wales, Australia	20 November 1981; Jersey City, New Jersey, United States		Mary Josephine Ward Sheed	4 January 1889; Shanklin, Isle of Wight, United Kingdom	28 January 1975; New York City, New York, United States	Diocese of Westminster
	Thomas Malcolm Muggeridge	24 March 1903; Sanderstead, Surrey, United Kingdom	14 November 1990; Robertsbridge, East Sussex, United Kingdom		Kathleen Rosalind Dobbs Muggeridge	8 December 1903; Château d'Oex, Vaud, Switzerland	11 June 1994; Welland, Ontario, Canada	Diocese of Arundel and Brighton
	Giacomo Spanu	1921; Italy	1991; Italy		Iside Giovanna de Zolt Spanu	28 December 1921; Calalzo di Cadore, Belluno, Italy	2003; Italy	Archdiocese of Cagliari
	Herbert Wallbrecher	21 June 1922; Hagen, North Rhine-Westphalia, Germany	5 January 1997; Bad Tölz, Bavaria, Germany		Gertraud Weiß Wallbrecher	18 May 1923; Munich, Bavaria, Germany	29 July 2016; Munich, Bavaria, Germany	Archdiocese of Munich and Freising
	Francisco González-Barros Albardonedo	19 October 1924; Soutelo de Montes, Forcarei, Pontevedra, Spain	30 December 2001; Madrid, Spain		Ramona González Penas de Gonzáles-Barros	21 September 1931; Soutelo de Montes, Forcarei, Pontevedra, Spain	3 February 2006; Madrid, Spain	Personal Prelature of the Holy Cross and Opus Dei
	Piero Corti	16 September 1925; Besana in Brianza, Monza e Brianza, Italy	20 April 2003; Milan, Italy		Lucille Teasdale-Corti	30 January 1929; Montreal, Québec, Canada	1 August 1996; Besana in Brianza, Monza e Brianza, Italy	Archdiocese of Milan
	Guerrino Casadio	9 May 1918; Castel Bolognese, Ravenna, Italy	24 August 2004; Imola, Bologna, Italy		Lucia Gambetti Casadio	14 February 1923; Imola, Bologna, Italy	6 November 1995; Imola, Bologna, Italy	Diocese of Imola
	Edward Warren	7 September 1926; Bridgeport, Connecticut, United States	23 August 2006; Monroe, Connecticut, United States		Lorraine Rita Moran Warren	31 January 1927; Bridgeport, Connecticut, United States	18 April 2019; Monroe, Connecticut, United States	Diocese of Bridgeport
	John Billings	5 March 1918; Melbourne, Victoria, Australia	1 April 2007; Richmond, Victoria, Australia		Evelyn Livingston thomas Billings	8 February 1918; Melbourne, Victoria, Australia	16 February 2013; Melbourne, Victoria, Australia	Archdiocese of Melbourne
	Robert Sargent Shriver Jr.	9 November 1915; Westminster, Maryland, United States	18 January 2011; Bethesda, Maryland, United States		Eunice Mary Kennedy Shriver	10 July 1921; Brookline, Massachusetts, United States	11 August 2009; Hyannis, Massachusetts, United States	Archdioceses of Baltimore and New York
	Peter Thomas Geach	29 March 1916; Chelsea, London, United Kingdom	21 December 2013; Cambridge, England, United Kingdom		Gertrude Elizabeth Margaret Anscombe Geach	18 March 1919; Limerick, Ireland	5 January 2001; Cambridge, England, United Kingdom	Diocese of East Anglia
	Alexander Joseph Toczko	26 September 1919; Stamford, Connecticut, United States	14 June 2015; San Diego, California, United States		Jeannette Dolores Malachowski Toczko	27 February 1919; Stamford, Connecticut, United States	15 June 2015; San Diego, California, United States	Diocese of San Diego
	Bob Lord	9 September 1935; The Bronx, New York, United States	13 February 2016; Morrilton, Arkansas, United States		Pauline Eve Macaluso Lord	23 September 1927; Brooklyn, New York, United States	21 January 2014; Morrilton, Arkansas, United States	Diocese of Little Rock
	Oscar Lang	16 August 1931; Raymond, Wisconsin, United States	24 January 2015; Caledonia, Wisconsin, United States		Vernetta Margaret Stieber Lang	6 September 1931; Wausau, Wisconsin, United States	24 January 2015; Caledonia, Wisconsin, United States	Archdiocese of Milwaukee
	Jerome Francis Coniker	2 November 1938; Chicago, Illinois, United States	4 July 2018; Kenosha, Wisconsin, United States		Servant of God; Gwen Cecilia Billings Coniker	27 September 1939; Chicago, Illinois, United States	15 June 2002; Bloomingdale, Ohio, United States	Diocese of Steubenville
	Romeu Trussardi Filho	1930; São Paulo, Brazil	20 August 2021; Alto de Pinheiros, São Paulo, Brazil		Maria da Conceição Aparecida "Maricy" Rodrigues Trussardi	19 December 1935; São Paulo, Brazil	16 January 2022; Alto de Pinheiros, São Paulo, Brazil	Archdiocese of São Paulo
	José Clóvis Arruda	1948; Guaratinguetá, São Paulo, Brazil	9 August 2024; Vinhedo, São Paulo, Brazil		Maria Auxiliadora Vaz de Arruda	1950; Guaratinguetá, São Paulo, Brazil	9 August 2024; Vinhedo, São Paulo, Brazil	Archdiocese of Aparecida
	João Monteiro de Barros Filho	5 November 1938; Barretos, São Paulo, Brazil	10 September 2026; Barretos, São Paulo, Brazil		Luiza Cardillo Monteiro de Barros	8 February 1938; Botelhos, Minas Gerais, Brazil	11 June 2017; Barretos, São Paulo, Brazil	Archdiocese of São Paulo

== Orthodox Church ==
- Saints Peter of Murom (1167–1228) and Fevronia of Murom (1175–1228), Russian Orthodox Couple; Prince and Princess consort of Murom; Wonderworkers (Russia)
- Saints Stefan Uroš IV Dušan (ca. 1308–1355) and Helena (1332–1359), Eastern Orthodox Couple; King and Queen of Serbia (Serbia-Bulgaria)
- Saints Dmitri Donskoy (1350–1389) and Eudoxia of Moscow (1353–1407), Russian Orthodox Couple; Grand Prince and Princess of Moscow (Russia)
- Saints Nikolay Aleksandrovich Romanov (1868–1918) and Alexandra Feodorovna Romanova (1872–1918), Russian Orthodox Couple; Emperor and Empress of Russia; Martyrs (Germany-Russia)
