= Lopushna =

Lopushna may refer to:

- Georgi Damyanovo, village
- Lopushna Monastery, Bulgaria
- Lopushna, Varna Province, Bulgaria
- Lopushna, Chernivtsi Oblast, Ukraine
- Lopushna, Lviv Oblast, Ukraine
- Lopushnia - village in Ivano-Frankivsk Oblast, Ukraine
