= St. Ann's Academy (Kamloops) =

Location
- 205 Columbia Street; Kamloops, British Columbia, V2C 2S7; Canada; 50.6706°N 120.3372°W

Information
- School type: Independent
- Founded: 1880, present school built 1910
- Superintendent: Chris Yuen
- Principal: Michael Carere
- Chaplain: Rev. Fr. Derrick Cameron
- Grades: K-12
- Enrollment: 450
- Language: English
- Mascot: Crusader
- Website: www.st-anns.ca

St. Ann's Academy (often abbreviated to "SAA") is a Roman Catholic school, under the administration of the CISKD (Catholic Independent Schools of Kamloops Diocese) school board.

The school is co-educational, offering academic, fine arts, and business programs, as well as athletic, performing arts, and other extracurricular programs, for students from grades K to 12.

== History ==
St. Ann's Academy was founded in 1880 by the Sisters of St. Ann. The present site was selected and purchased by the Sisters in 1910.

St. Ann's Academy remained a high school until 1970, unable to keep up with the changing demands of B.C.'s curriculum, it reverted to an elementary school. The Sisters continued to administer the school until 1978. Although the Sisters of St. Ann's, from the city of Victoria's St. Ann's Academy founded the school, they no longer teach there.

In 1980, Bishop Adam Exner asked the Congregation of Christian Brothers to open the high school section and in September 1981, St. Ann's Academy became a high school again.

=== Feeder Schools ===
- Our Lady of Perpetual Help – Kamloops
- St. Ann’s Academy (Pre-school to Grade 12) – Kamloops
- Saint Ann's Elementary School – Quesnel
- Saint James Elementary & Middle school – Vernon
- Sacred Heart Catholic School – Williams Lake

== Independent school status ==
St. Ann's Academy is classified as a Group 1 school under British Columbia's Independent School Act. It receives 50% funding from the Ministry of Education. The school receives no funding for capital costs. It is under charge of the Roman Catholic Diocese of Kamloops.

== Academic performance ==
In 2024-2025, St. Ann's Academy Elementary is ranked 35th of 951 elementary schools, in the province of British Columbia, by the Fraser Institute. St. Ann's Academy Secondary is ranked 173rd of 252 high schools, in the province of British Columbia, by the Fraser Institute.

Academic Departments
Business
Mathematics
Performing Arts
Social Studies
Christian Education
English
Humanities
Information Technology
Languages
Science
Physical Education
Visual Arts

== Athletic performance ==
St. Ann's is an associated member of BC school sports. It competes, under the name 'Crusaders', in the following sports:

- Volleyball
- Basketball
- Soccer
- Rugby
- Golf
- Wrestling
- Badminton
- Track & Field
- Speed Swimming
- Flag Football

== Artistic programs ==
Performing Arts	Visual Arts	Trades
Rising Stars Elementary Choir	Photography	Sewing
High School Choir	Painting	Foods/Cooking
Jazz Choir (Grades 10-12)	Sculpture	Computer Programming
Junior Band	Year Book	Wood Working
Senior Band (High School)
Drama

== See also ==
- St. Ann's Academy (Victoria, British Columbia) – founding school and convent of the Sisters of St. Ann's.
