= Viso =

Viso may refer to:

- E. J. Viso (born 1985), Venezuelan racing driver
- Monte Viso, mountain in Italy
- El Viso, city in Spain

== Computing ==
- Virtual ISO, i.e. constructed in memory from a bunch of files on the host for a virtual machine running over it. A VISO is just the recipe describing how to go about this using a syntax vaguely similar to mkisofs and genisoimage.

== See also ==
- Vișeu, a river in Romania
