= El Viso =

Coordinates: 38°29′N 4°57′W

- Municipality
- Flag Seal

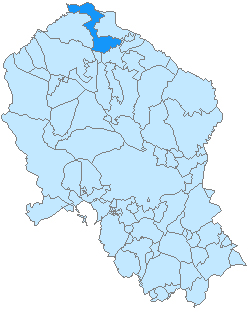
- Country: Spain
- Autonomous community: Andalusia
- Province: Córdoba

Area
  - Total: 254 km^{2} (98 sq mi)
- Elevation: 577 m (1,893 ft)

Population (2025-01-01)
  - Total: 2,499
  - Density: 9.84/km^{2} (25.5/sq mi)
- Time zone: UTC+1 (CET)
  - Summer (DST): UTC+2 (CEST)
- Website: www.ayto-elviso.com

El Viso is a village located in the province of Córdoba, Spain. According to the 2006 census (INE), the village has a population of 2,849 inhabitants. It is next to Belalcázar, Hinojosa del Duque, Villaralto, Dos Torres and Santa Eufemia and also next to Ciudad Real, Badajoz and Cabeza del Buey.

== History ==
EL Viso became part of the "Condado de Santa Eufemia" in the 15th century. It became one of the most important village of this "condado" when the feudal system broke down in the 19th century.

== Demography ==
There has been a rural exodus shown by the population changes between 1996 (3,208 people) and 2013 (2,723 people).

== Festivities ==
The most important event in El Viso is the fun fair in honor to Santa Ana, the patrone of the village. It takes place on 26 July every year, when all the "viseño" (people from El Viso) go to the church behind the village and celebrate a Mass for the patrone at 6:00 in the morning.

== See also ==
- List of municipalities in Córdoba
