= John Palmer (Archdeacon of Southern Melanesia) =

English missionary and priest (1837–1902)

John Palmer was an English priest who worked as a missionary for the Anglican Church in Melanesia.

Palmer was born at Woodstock, Oxfordshire, England and baptised on 19 November 1837. He was educated at St John's College, Auckland and ordained in 1867. He was a missionary on Norfolk Island from 1863, head of the Melanesian Mission from 1892, and Archdeacon of Southern Melanesia from 1894. He died in 1902 and was buried at O'Neill's Point Cemetery.
