= O'Neill's Point Cemetery =

Cemetery in Auckland, New Zealand

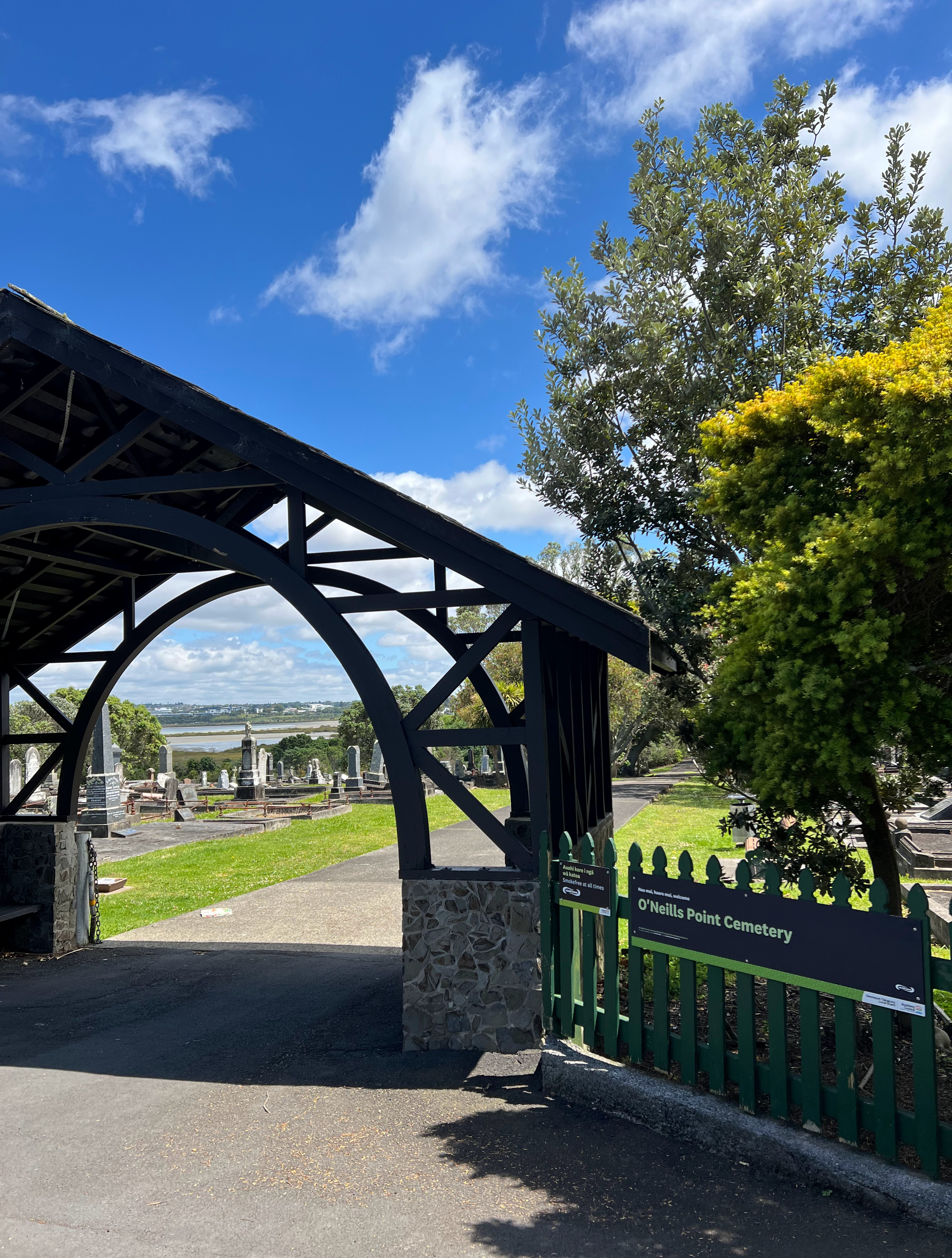
- Outside O'Neill's Point Cemetery at the lychgate Outside the cemetery, at the lychgate
- Interactive map of O'Neill's Point Cemetery

Details
- Established: 1891
- Location: Auckland
- Country: New Zealand
- Coordinates: 36.81030°S 174.78128°E
- Type: Historic
- Find a Grave: O'Neill's Point Cemetery

Heritage New Zealand – Category 1
- Official name: O'Neill's Point Cemetery
- Designated: 7 July 2022
- Reference no.: 9394

O'Neill's Point Cemetery is a historic cemetery and reserve located in Bayswater, New Zealand. It is a 3.4 hectare tract of land that extends from Bayswater Ave, down to the shore of Shoal Bay. Across from it is Bayswater Park. There is a walking and cycling track that runs beside the cemetery that connects Bayswater to Takapuna and Devonport to the north and south respectively.

Built in 1891, O'Neill's acted as a second-generation cemetery to the Mount Victoria Cemetery in Devonport after this site raised health and safety concern for its proximity to the local residences. The cemetery is listed on the Heritage New Zealand List as a category 1 heritage site. It is noted as particularly significant as it contains the final resting place of many prominent early New Zealanders as well as WWI veterans of Pacific and Māori background who were trained at Narrowneck Camp.

== History ==
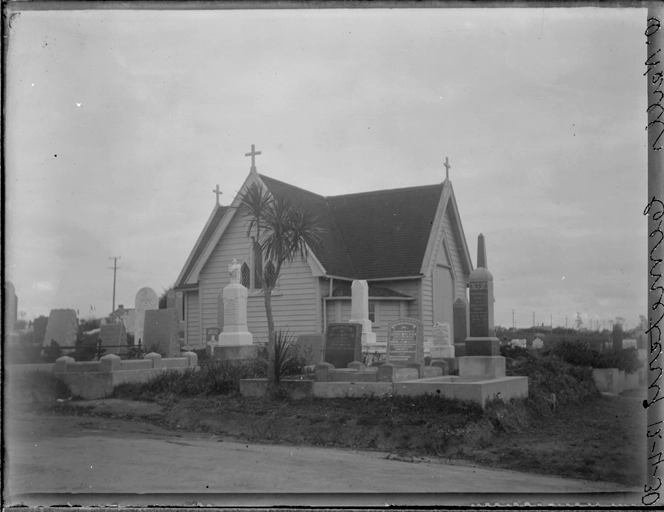
The now demolished mortuary chapel at O'Neill's Point Cemetery

The land the O'Neill's Point Cemetery was built on was given to the Devonport Borough council by James Frederick O'Neill to build a cemetery on in 1898. The need for a new cemetery came when the existing cemetery in Devonport, Mount Victoria Cemetery, raised health concerns from residents as it was located in the centre of the town. At this time, Bayswater was mostly vacant land and so was an appropriate place just outside of the Devonport area to set up a cemetery.

The cemetery's layout was designed by John Francis Boylan, a prominent engineer from the Auckland area. The plots formed a rectilinear grid that allowed for people to walk easily amongst the graves, which was lined with native trees. These plots were divided into Anglican, Catholic and Unsectarian sections. The cemetery was open for interments in August 1891.

In 1895, more grave plots were added to the existing plots, and in 1897, a mortuary chapel was constructed. It was designed by Edward Bartley in the Gothic Revival style. Further plots were added in 1903.

In 1910, a wharf was built at the end of the Bayswater peninsula with regular steam ferry services to Auckland city. A tram service connected this ferry terminal to Takapuna. Because of increased access to the peninsula and an increase population, the Bayswater peninsula began to grow in popularity as a residential area. By the 1930s, the cemetery became increasingly full, and therefore the amount of people interred at the cemetery decreased significantly. Petitions to increase the size of the cemetery as well as add a crematorium were opposed by the Takapuna Council, who now had jurisdiction over the land surrounding the cemetery. This decrease in internments led to the demolition of the mortuary chapel some time before 1959.

The ownership of the cemetery transferred to the City of Takapuna in 1972, and in 1974, the North Shore Memorial Park opened for burials for people from the broader North Shore area, which had grown substantially after the construction of the Auckland Harbour Bridge. At this point, the cemetery became open only to burials within existing family plots.

== Significance ==
As one of the first cemeteries in the Auckland area, O'Neill's Point Cemetery is the resting place of many notable figures in early Auckland history.

This cemetery has distinct significance in Pacific Island history in 20th century Auckland as the main burial site in New Zealand for Pasifika soldiers who served in World War I. One tenth of the Pacific Island NZEF soldiers buried are there. It is especially significant as many other sites connected to early Pacific Island history in New Zealand no longer exist. These Pacific Island soldiers are buried here due to the cemetery's proximity to the Narrowneck Military Camp, where many Māori and Pacific Island soldiers were trained before leaving to war. Tragically, many of these men never left the Narrowneck Camp because many died of the Flu Pandemic in 1918.

== Notable burials ==
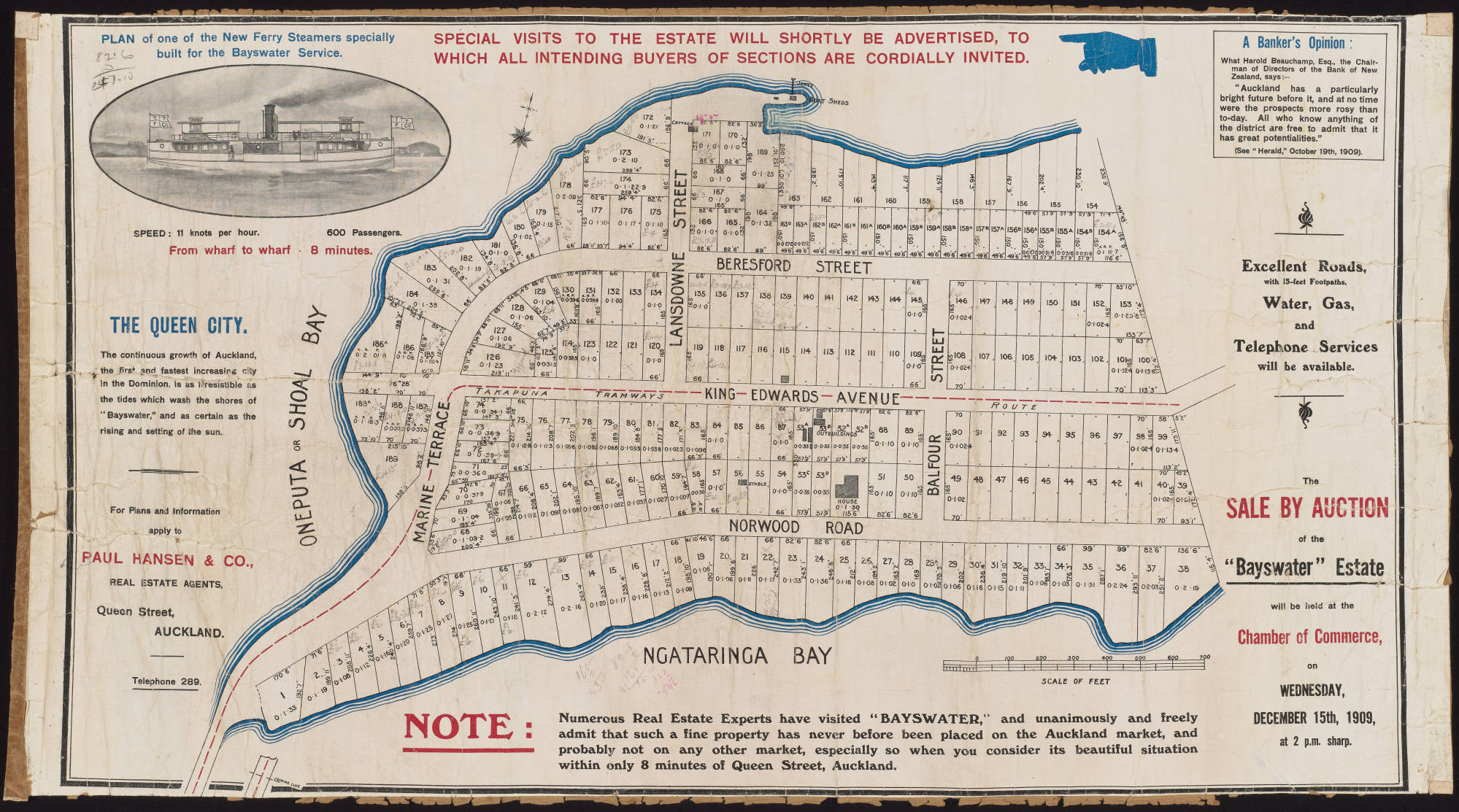

=== Christian figures ===
- Thomas (1803–1892) and Mary (1812–1891) Poynton: Key figures in the growth of Catholicism in New Zealand. Celebrated the first Catholic mass in New Zealand in their home in Hokianga.
- John Palmer (1837–1902): Archdeacon of South Melanesia and missionary of the Melanesian Mission for 40 years.

=== Military personnel ===
- Private Vilipate (1893–1915): First Pacific Islander military death. Vilipate was from Niue and died of pneumonia after he arrived in New Zealand.
- Sergeant Beni Banaba (1890–1917): Came from an important chiefly family in Manihiri in the Cook Islands. Served in Egypt and Palestine between 1916 - 1917. Died of tuberculosis.

=== 1918 Flu epidemic casualties ===
- Private Mannao (Manuao) Fati (1880–1918): From Tuvalu.
- Private Tonuia (1891–1918): From Tuvalu.
- Private Laliqapata Illitomasi (1891–1918): From Fiji.
- Te Hapa Ihaia (c. 1893–1919): Waikato Māori. Participated in passive resistance movement against engaging in warfare led by Te Puea.
- Tame Tahi (died 1918): Waikato Māori. Participated in passive resistance movement against engaging in warfare led by Te Puea.
- Kiri Toto (c.1895-1918): Waikato Māori. Participated in passive resistance movement against engaging in warfare led by Te Puea
- Rupena Hihi (c.1891-1918): Waikato Māori. Participated in passive resistance movement against engaging in warfare led by Te Puea.
- Isabelle Maude (Maud) Manning (1870–1918): Volunteered to look after the Māori and Pasifika troops who caught the flu. Died of the flu herself.

== Gravestones ==
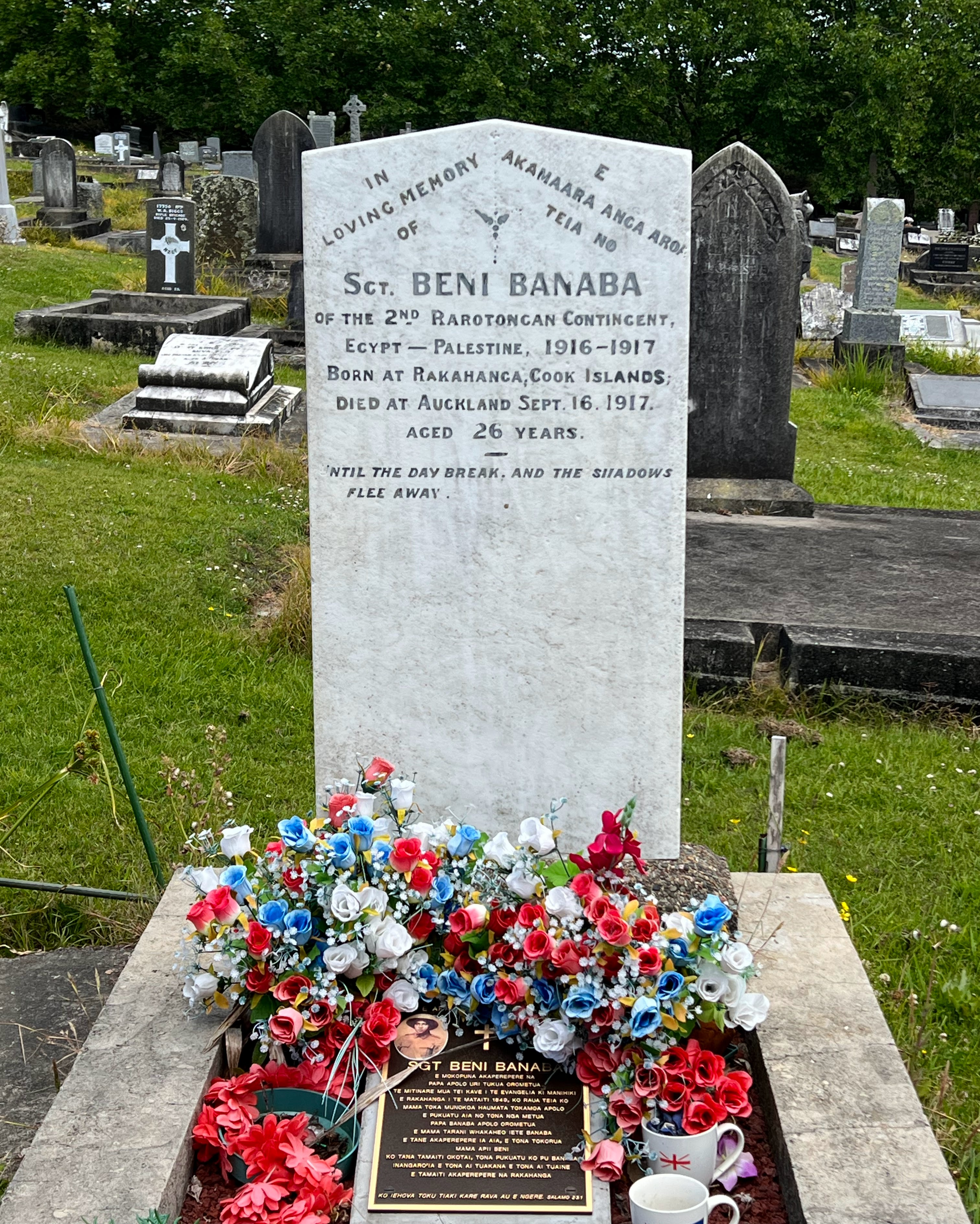

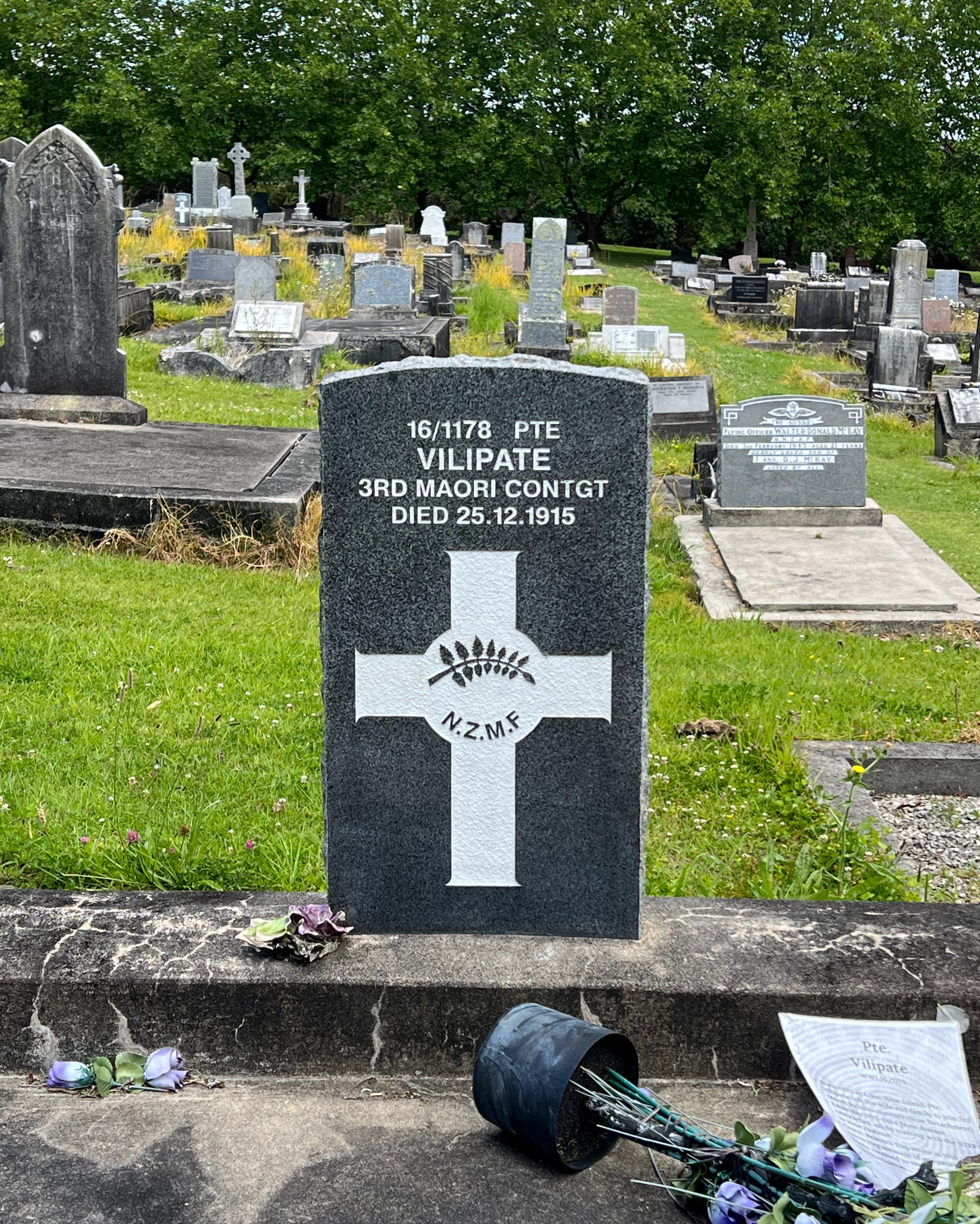

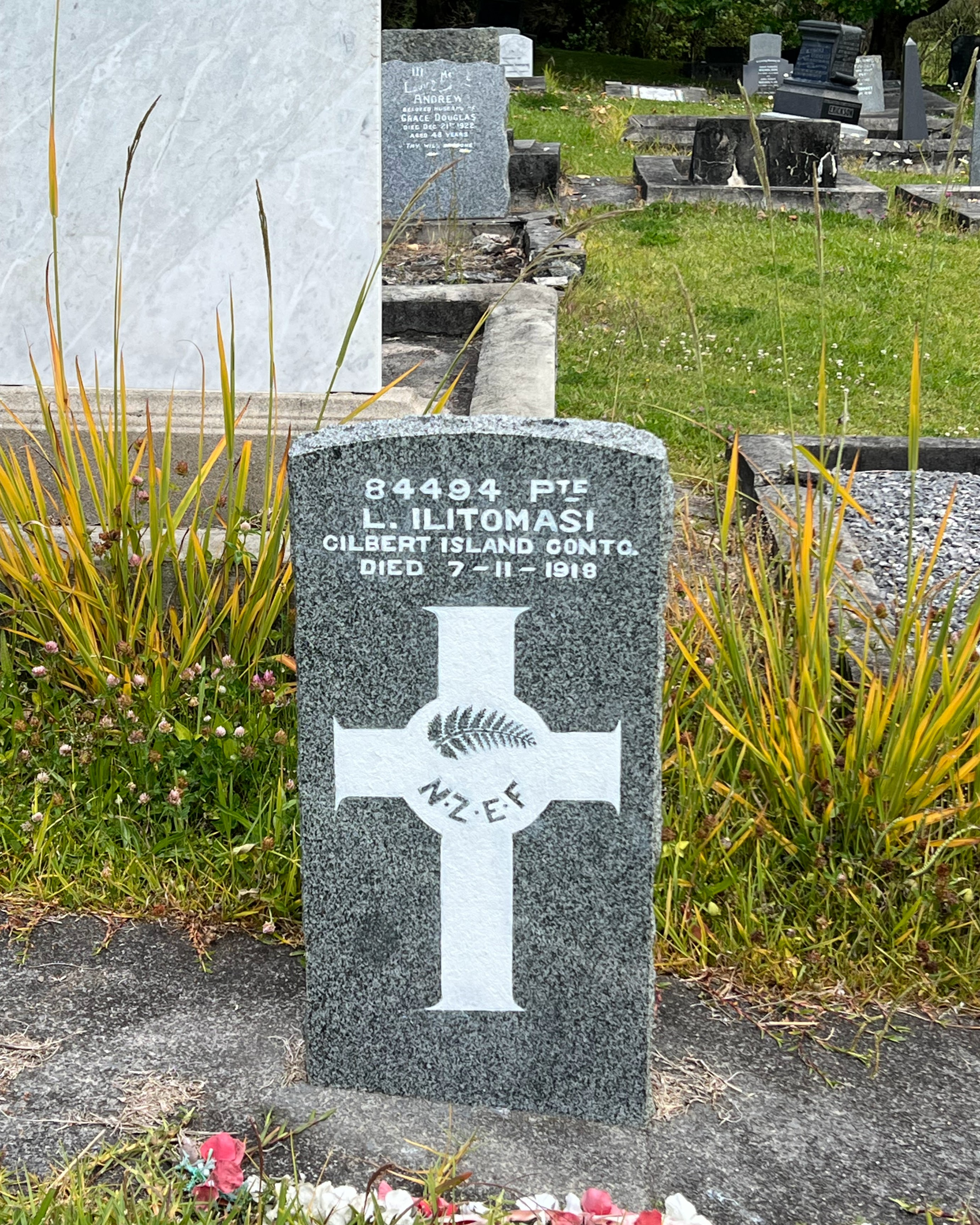

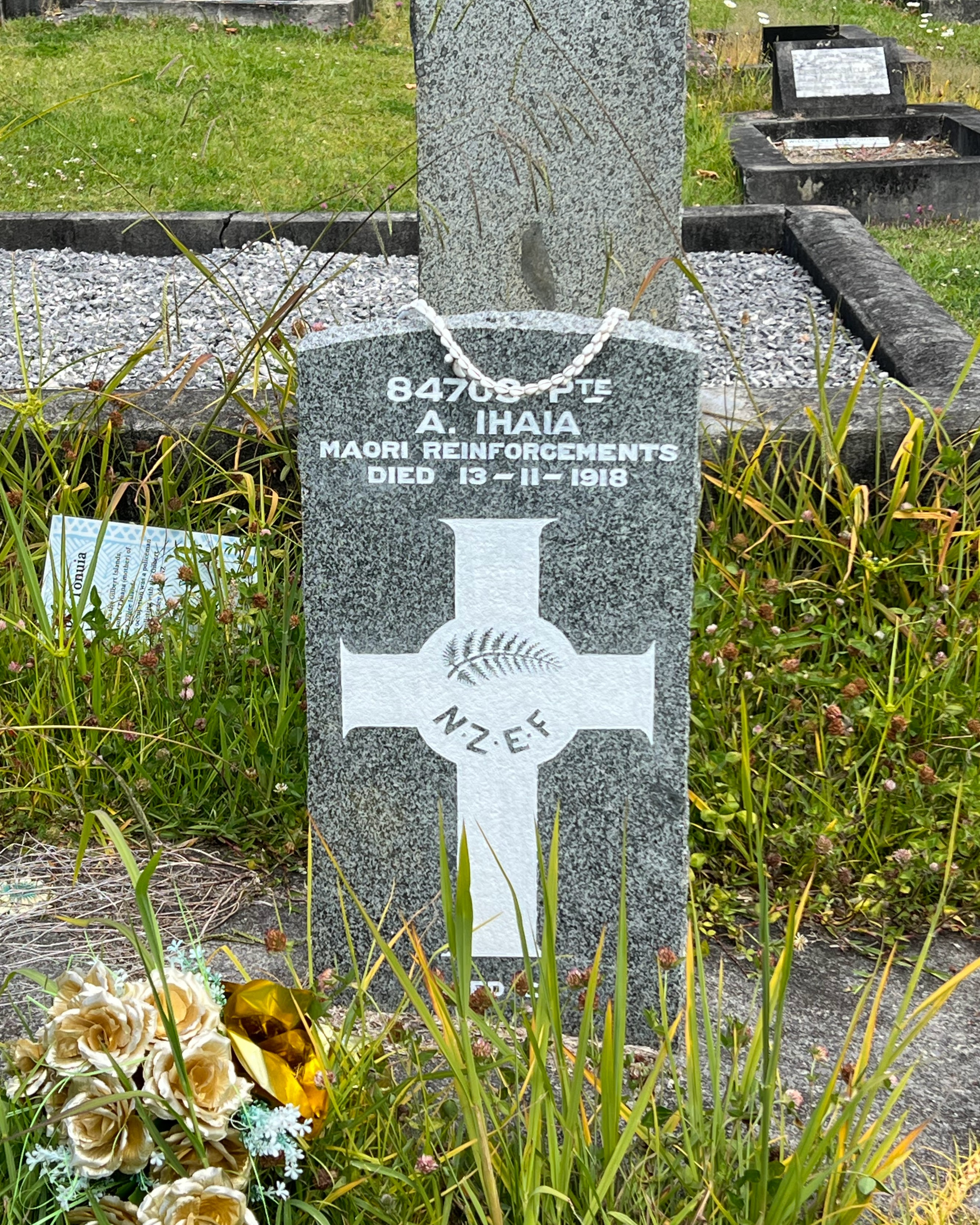

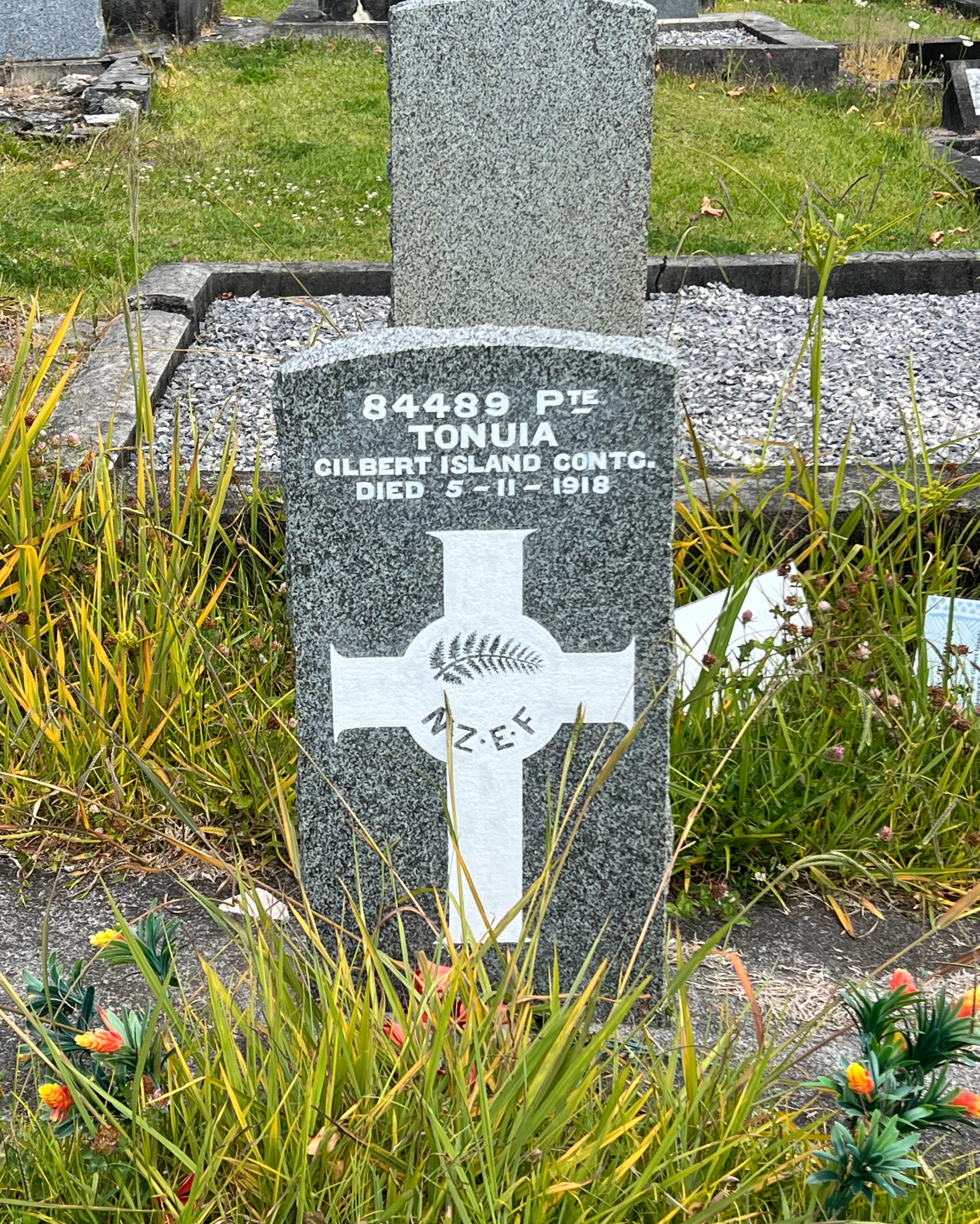

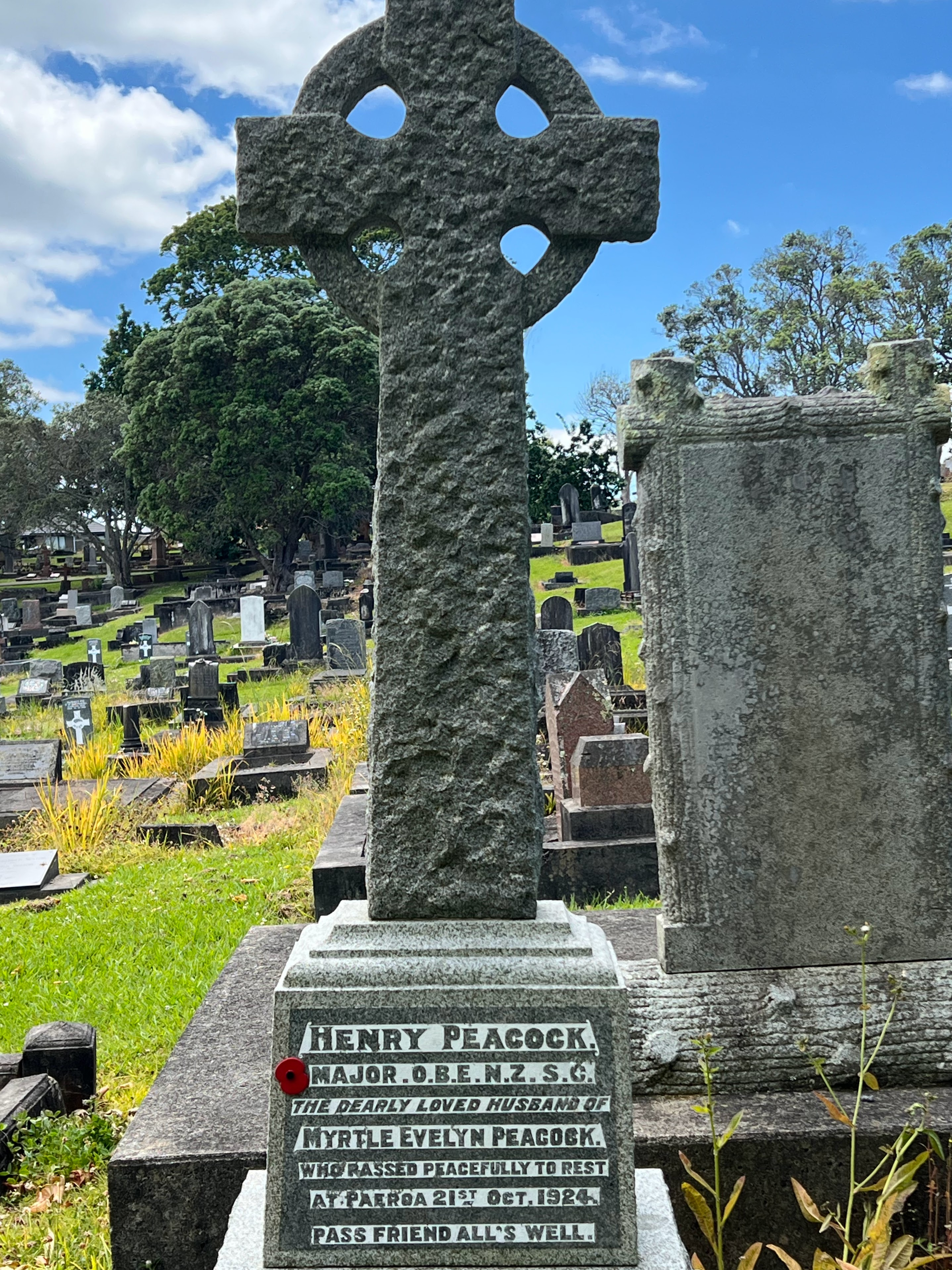

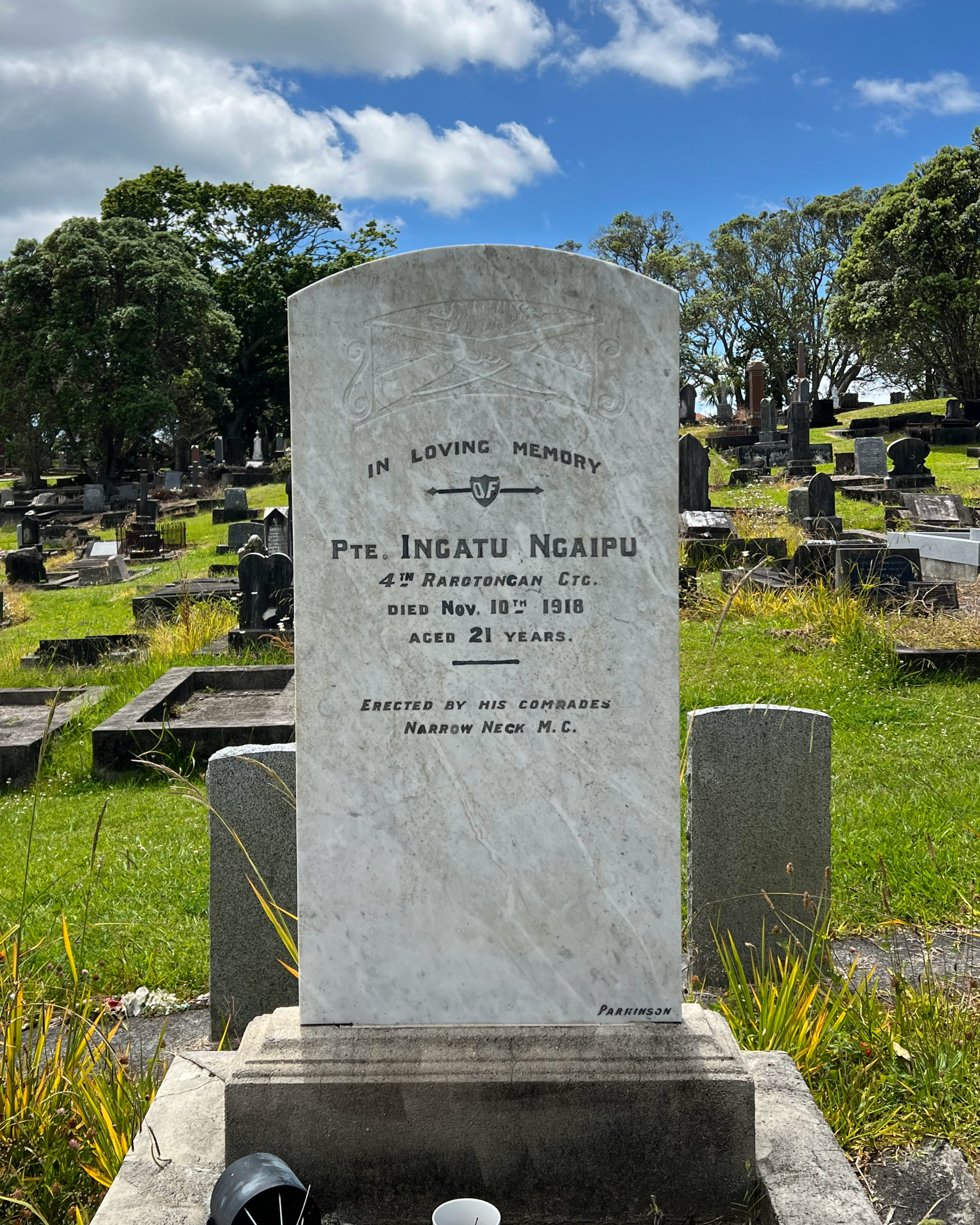

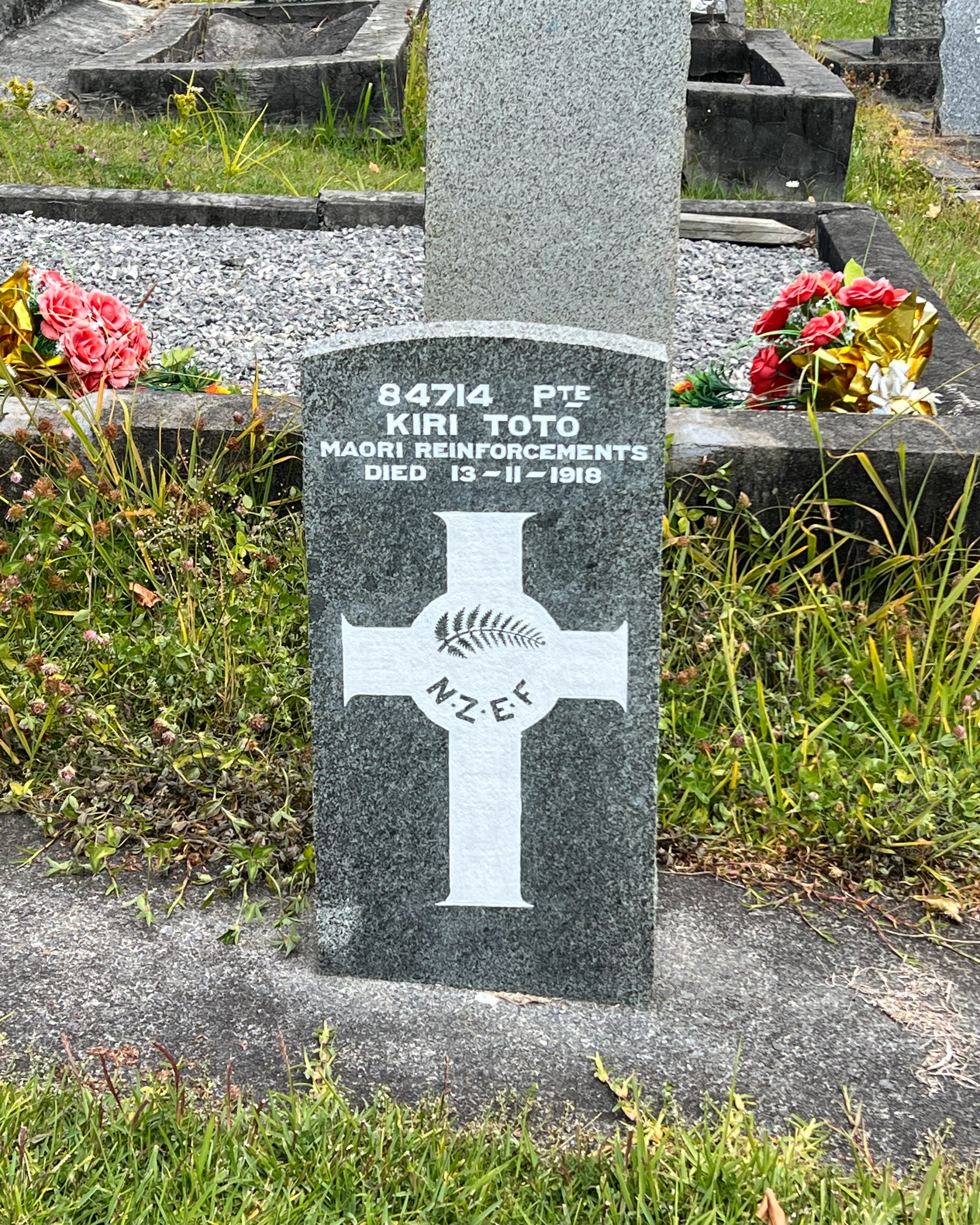

== Gallery ==
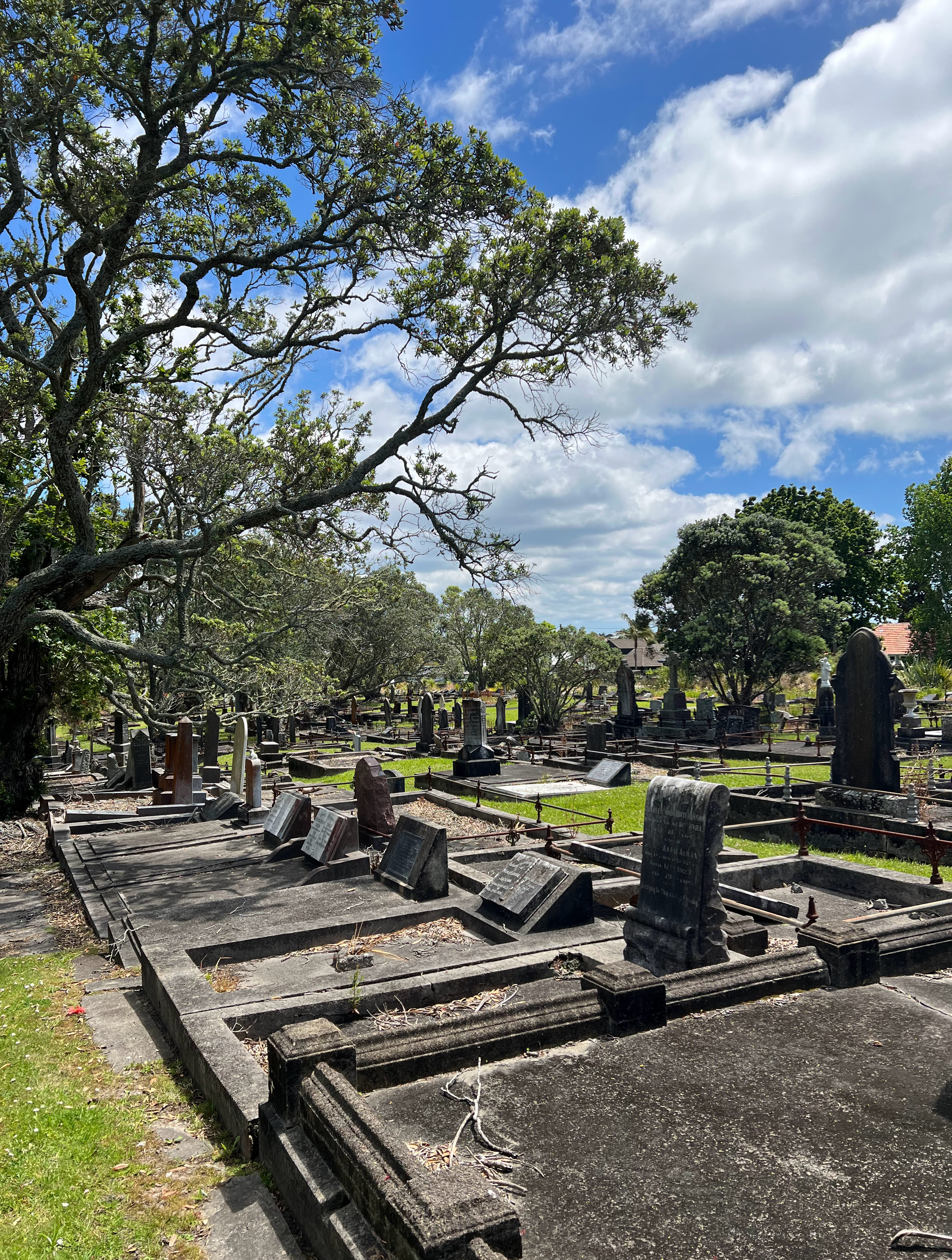
Inside O'Neill's Cemetery
