= Taden =

Taden Taden
- Commune
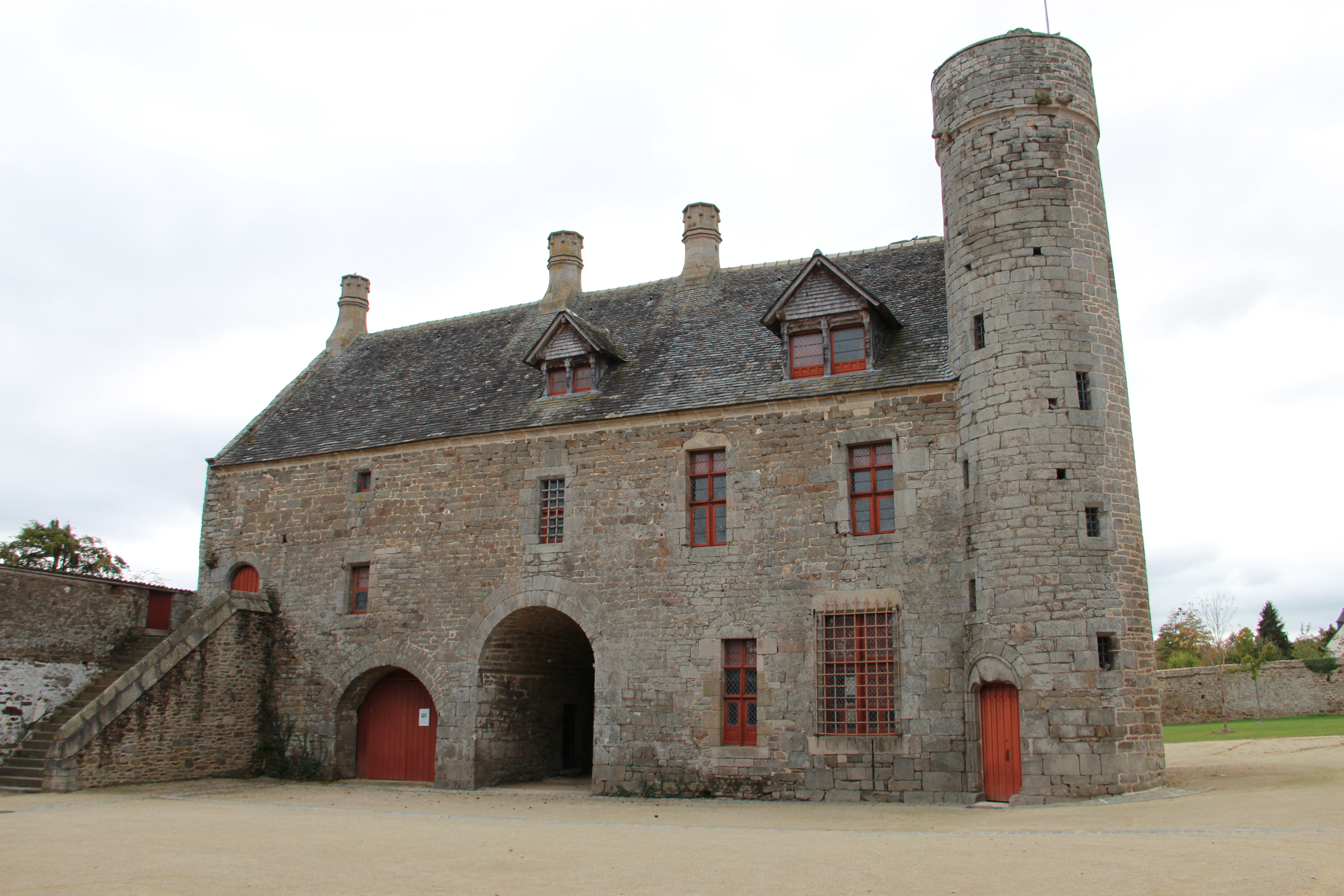
- Manor house

- Coat of arms
- Location of Taden
- Location within France Location within Brittany
- Coordinates: 48°28′34″N 2°01′39″W
- Country: France
- Region: Brittany
- Department: Côtes-d'Armor
- Arrondissement: Dinan
- Canton: Pleslin-Trigavou
- Intercommunality: Dinan Agglomération

Government
  - Mayor (2020–2026): Évelyne Thoreux
- Area^{1}: 20.13 km^{2} (7.77 sq mi)
- Highest elevation: 90 m (300 ft)
- Lowest elevation: 7 m (23 ft)
- Population (2023): 2,636
  - Density: 130.9/km^{2} (339.2/sq mi)
- Time zone: UTC+01:00 (CET)
  - Summer (DST): UTC+02:00 (CEST)
- INSEE/Postal code: 22339 /22100
- ^{1} French Land Register data, which excludes lakes, ponds, glaciers > 1 km^{2} (0.386 sq mi or 247 acres) and river estuaries.

Taden (French pronunciation: [tadɛ̃]; Breton: Taden; Gallo: Taden) is a commune in the Côtes-d'Armor department of Brittany in northwestern France.

== Population ==
Inhabitants of Taden are called Tadennais in French.

Historical population
Year	Pop.	±% p.a.
1968	1,175	—
1975	1,508	+3.63%
1982	1,616	+0.99%
1990	1,698	+0.62%
1999	1,741	+0.28%
2007	1,942	+1.38%
2012	2,249	+2.98%
2017	2,467	+1.87%
2023	2,636	+1.11%
Source: INSEE

== See also ==
- Communes of the Côtes-d'Armor department
