= Juliette Colbert de Barolo =

Venerable Juliette Colbert Falletti de Barolo OFS
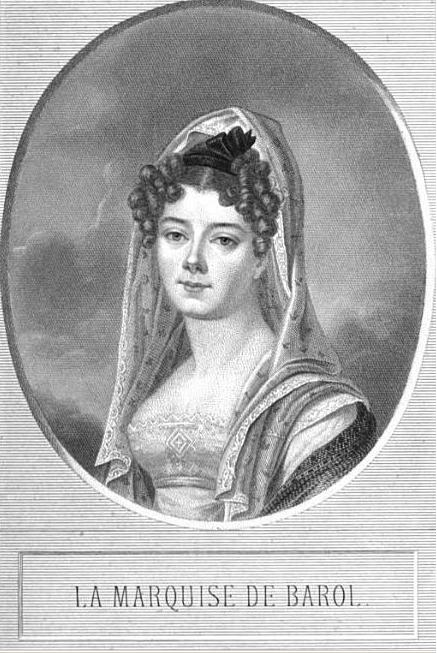
- Born: 26 June 1786; Maulévrier, Maine-et-Loire, Vendée, Kingdom of France
- Died: 19 January 1864 (aged 77); Turin, Kingdom of Italy

Juliette Colbert Falletti de Barolo (26 June 1786 – 19 January 1864) - born as Juliette Victoire Colbert and known in Italy as Giulia Falletti di Barolo - was a French Roman Catholic philanthropist and the founder of both the Sisters of Saint Anne and the Daughters of Jesus the Good Shepherd. Colbert was a well-educated girl living in France during and after the tumultuous French Revolution which caused her faith to deepen since she had the desire to aid the poor and neglected. Her marriage to a nobleman in Paris led to the two setting off to live in Turin where the couple threw themselves into charitable works. The couple bore no children but rather "adopted" the town's poor. Colbert was widowed some decades later and became professed into the Secular Franciscan Order while establishing hospitals and schools as well as other charitable institutions.

Her cause for canonization opened in late 1990 (she became titled as a Servant of God) and culminated in mid-2015 when Pope Francis confirmed her heroic virtue and named her as venerable. Her husband's cause was opened in 1995 and he remains a Servant of God.

== Life ==
Juliette Victorienne Françoise Colbert was born in Maulévrier on 26 June 1786 as the second of four children to the nobles Edouard Victurnien Charles René Colbert (15 December 1754 – August 1839) and Annemarie Louise de Crénolle (the couple married on 12 March 1782). Her father served as an ambassador for Maximilian Franz von Österreich. Her ancestor was the former Finance Minister Jean Baptiste Colbert who served for King Louis XIV (either the great-granddaughter or descended from his brother). In October 1793 her mother died in Brussels leaving her father to care for the children. Her siblings (in order) were:

- Elisabeth-Marie (11 February 1783 – 19 April 1835)
- Edouard-Auguste (d. November 1817)
- Charles-Antoine (11 February 1793 – 26 July 1859)

Her father remarried on 19 April 1812 to Pauline Le Clerc and she had a half-brother in René-Oliver (b. 19 March 1813). Colbert studied art and music in her private studies and learnt Greek and Latin as well as English and Italian and German when the Colbert's lived there.

The French Revolution forced her father to relocate with his children in 1793 to the German Kingdom before settling in Holland and Belgium (her mother died in Brussels); their return to France came after Napoleon Bonaparte assumed power. Upon their return their castle had been burnt down and their land had been laid waste. Colbert had been traumatized with the death of her aunt and paternal grandmother at the guillotine in 1794 (during the Terror) added with the death of her mother months before. In 1804 she served Empress Josephine in the imperial court where she first met her future husband. The two had in common a deep faith and desire to aid others though their temperaments were different: she was impetuous with a brilliant mind while he was gentle and reserved in nature. Colbert married the nobleman Carlo Tancredi Falletti di Barolo in Paris on 18 August 1806 and the couple later relocated to Turin (it was supposed to be brief but became a permanent arrangement) in 1814 after Napoleon's fall where the couple lived childless for the remainder of their lives together. Prince Camillo Borghese helped in mediating the union between the couple. The couple bore no children (both were infertile) but viewed the poor as their adopted children. It became the norm for her to help prisoners as well as poor girls and their mothers. Colbert created free schools with her husband for children and the first opened in Borgo Dora in 1821; she founded the Istituto del Rifugio for mothers in 1823 and an institute for victims of child prostitution later in 1833.

In 1814 - during the Easter Octave - she encountered a Eucharistic procession to an ill person and knelt before the Blessed Sacrament. But a piercing scream broke the procession: "It is soup I need, not Viaticum!" This provocation from an inmate in a prison near the procession led Colbert to visit the prison where she was shocked from the degradation of the prisoners and their conditions. This moved her to help them.

In 1834 she founded the Sisters of Saint Anne with the Archbishop of Turin Luigi Fransoni encouraging her work; she later founded the Daughters of Jesus the Good Shepherd. In 1835 she distinguished herself in aiding the ill during a cholera epidemic which saw officials award her with the Order of Saints Maurizio and Lazzaro. Her husband contracted this which caused great concern granted his frail health at the time. The doctors advised that he seek treatment in Austria though his condition deteriorated after contracting a violent fever forcing the pair to stop in Verona. The pair moved for respite at an inn in Chiari in Brescia where he died in her arms on 4 September 1838. Colbert later provided the former prisoner Silvio Pellico with an annual pension from 1834 until his death in 1854 and she provided for the French translation of his published works. Pellico first served as the couple's librarian in 1834 and the two became good friends with Pellico who became Colbert's private aide in 1838 after her husband died. In 1845 she opened the Hospital of Saint Filomena for handicapped children and in 1847 established a vocational school for aspiring workers. Colbert often wore a hair shirt of coarse horsehair as a penitential practice.

Colbert became a professed member in the Secular Franciscan Order at some stage after her husband died. It was around this stage that her spiritual director was Giuseppe Cafasso. In 1862 the election for a new superior-general was held and the Sisters of Saint Anne saw fit to elect Caterina Dominici. In 1845 she travelled to Rome for six months in the hopes of expediting her claim for papal recognition of her orders. Colbert succeeded in this venture and Pope Gregory XVI provided canonical recognition in a decree on 8 March 1846 not long before the pontiff's death.

Colbert was close friends with Madeleine Sophie Barat and supported the efforts of Giuseppe Benedetto Cottolengo in social activities. But she also came into contact with Giovanni Bosco and asked him to serve as a chaplain for the Istituto del Rifugio. But his ill health sometime after proved a challenge since he refused to abandon the girls prompting Colbert to ask him to leave so as to take care of his own health.

Her death came in 1864 after having fallen ill in October 1863 and her remains have been housed in the Santa Giulia church since 1899 after their transferral. Colbert had founded not long before her death the Opera Pia Barolo in order for that institute to be able to continue her work; she had left her entire fortune to that institute.

=== Barolo wine ===
The couple were both identified with the famous Barolo wine. It had long been rumored that the wine had been produced in Turin at their estate but at that point had never been sold on the market. Once the King Carlo Alberto joked with her and asked if it were true that the wine was produced there. It was within the week that she sent out several ox-drawn carts to the palace with 325 barrels for the king.

Colbert offered it to her guests and to reigning monarchs.

== Beatification process ==
The cause for canonization opened on 17 November 1990 under Pope John Paul II and she became titled as a Servant of God after the Congregation for the Causes of Saints issued an official edict declaring "nihil obstat" (nothing against the cause). The diocesan phase of investigation was inaugurated under Giovanni Saldarini on 21 January 1991 who later closed it on 4 July 1994; the Congregation later validated this process on 13 January 1995. In 2009 the postulation submitted the positio for further assessment with historical advisors issuing their assent on 27 October 2009 to the cause.

Theologians affirmed their support for the cause on 1 April 2014 following their assessment of the Positio with the cardinal and bishop members of the Congregation also approving it on 21 April 2015. Colbert became titled as Venerable on 5 May 2015 after Pope Francis confirmed that she had lived a life of heroic virtue. The postulator for this cause is the Capuchin friar Paolino Rossi.

== See also ==
- Carlo Tancredi Falletti di Barolo
