= Congregation of the Sisters of St. Ann =

Sisters of St. Ann
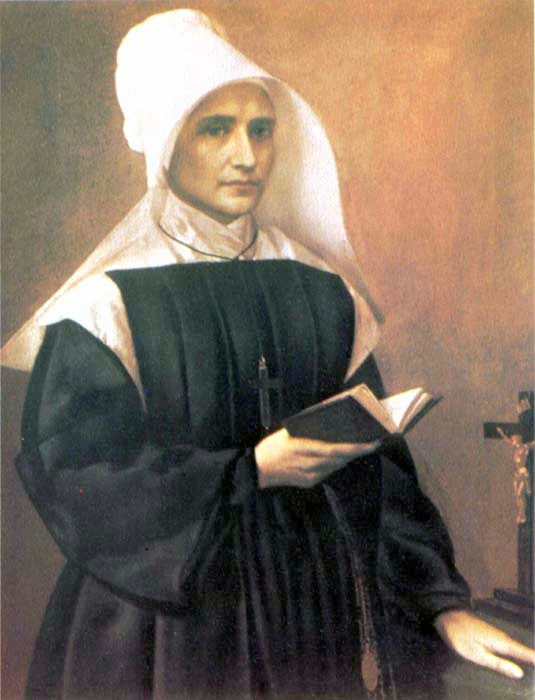
- The Blessed Mary Henrietta Dominici, SSA, Superior General (1861-1894)
- Formation: 1834
- Type: religious congregation
- Headquarters: Rome, Italy
- Location(s): Italy, India, Argentina, Albania, Brazil, Cameroon, Mexico, Peru, the Philippines, Switzerland, the United Kingdom and the United States
- Affiliations: Catholic Church
- Website: Congregation of the Sisters of St. Ann

The Congregation of the Sisters of St. Ann, sometimes called the Sisters of St. Ann of Providence, are a congregation of Roman Catholic of Religious Sisters founded in the Kingdom of Sardinia in 1834 for the care of children and of the poor. The Sisters use the postnominal initials of SSA

== History ==
=== Foundation ===
The congregation was founded in Turin in 1834 by Carlo Tancredi Falletti di Barolo (1782–1838) and the Servant of God Juliette (Giulia) Colbert, TOSF (1785–1864), the Marchese and Marchioness of Barolo. The childless couple had opened their own palace to the children of the streets of the city, and were seeking to provide for their education.

The volunteers they had recruited to help with this mission agreed to embrace the consecrated life. Other women joined the congregation and they began to serve in various towns and villages throughout the Piedmont region and then elsewhere in Italy. The congregation expanded to such a degree that they received the decree of praise from the Holy See, establishing them as a congregation of Pontifical Right, in 1846.

=== Expansion ===
The congregation further developed under the leadership of Mother Mary Henrietta Dominici, SSA, who was elected as the Superior General of the congregation in 1861 and served in that office until 1894. Under her inspiration, the Sisters embraced the concept of worldwide service, and in 1871 the first Sisters of St. Ann were sent as missionaries to India. Their first house was in Secunderabad in Andhra Pradesh, from which they began to expand to other parts of India. That region now has the largest group of communities of the Sisters of St. Ann. Dominici was beatified by Pope Paul VI in 1978.

The Sisters began to serve in Switzerland in 1920, where they helped immigrants to that country, mostly Italians. In 1952 they established a presence in the United States. In the 1960s, in answer to an appeal by Pope John XXIII, they expanded to serve in various other countries. They now serve in Albania, Argentina, Brazil, Cameroon, Mexico, Peru, the Philippines and the United Kingdom.
