= Marcillac-la-Croisille =

- Commune
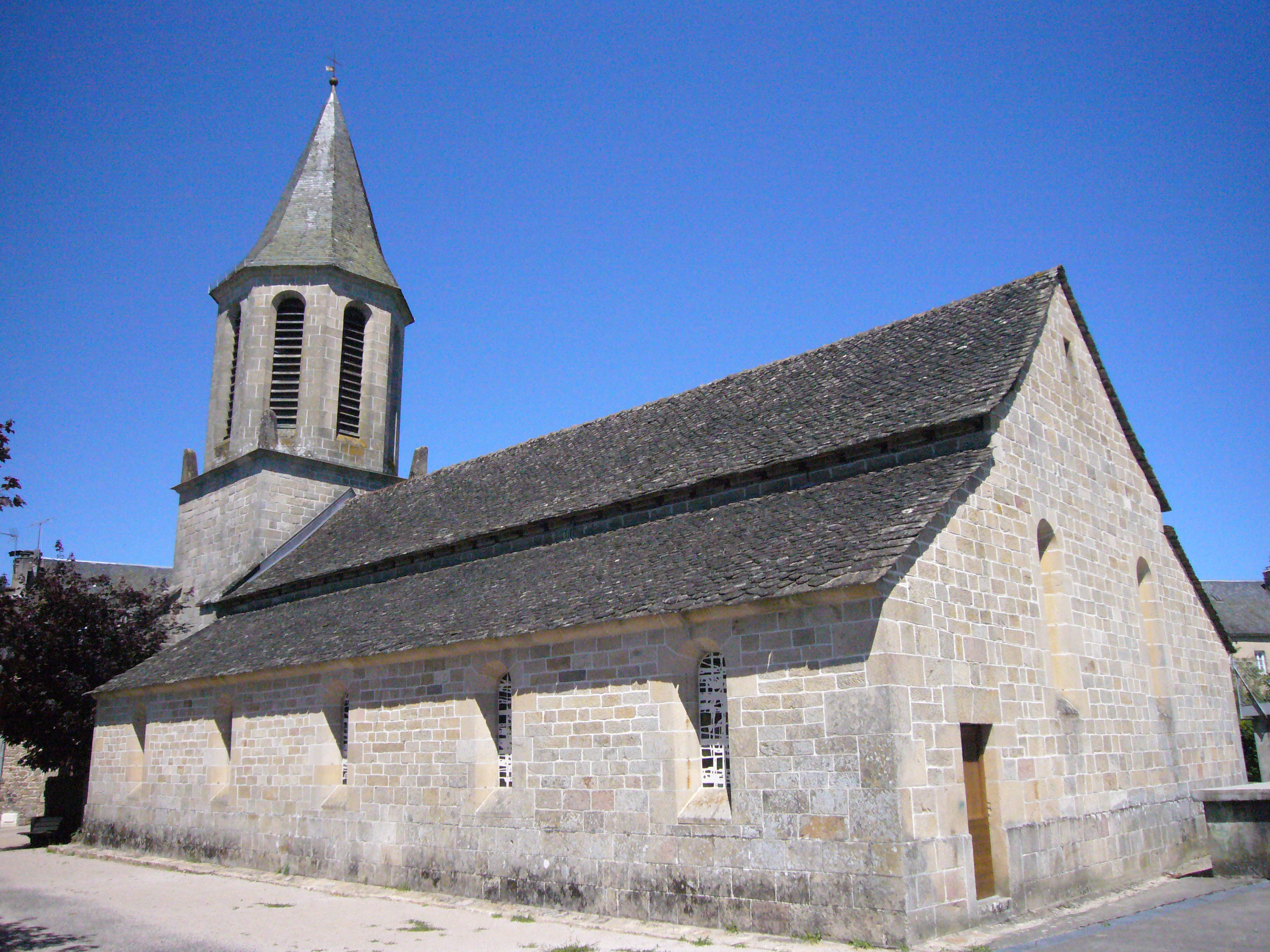
- The church in Marcillac-la-Croisille

- Coat of arms
- Location of Marcillac-la-Croisille
- Location within France Location within Nouvelle-Aquitaine
- Coordinates: 45°16′24″N 2°01′49″E
- Country: France
- Region: Nouvelle-Aquitaine
- Department: Corrèze
- Arrondissement: Ussel
- Canton: Égletons

Government
  - Mayor (2020–2026): Jean-Louis Bachellerie
- Area^{1}: 38.69 km^{2} (14.94 sq mi)
- Elevation: 530 m (1,740 ft)
- Highest elevation: 642 m (2,106 ft)
- Lowest elevation: 247 m (810 ft)
- Population (2023): 857
  - Density: 22.2/km^{2} (57.4/sq mi)
- Time zone: UTC+01:00 (CET)
  - Summer (DST): UTC+02:00 (CEST)
- INSEE/Postal code: 19125 /19320
- ^{1} French Land Register data, which excludes lakes, ponds, glaciers > 1 km^{2} (0.386 sq mi or 247 acres) and river estuaries.

Marcillac-la-Croisille (French pronunciation: [maʁsijak la kʁwazij]; Occitan: Marcilhac la Crosilha) is a commune in the Corrèze department in central France.

== Population ==
Historical population
Year	Pop.	±% p.a.
1968	907	—
1975	801	−1.76%
1982	777	−0.43%
1990	787	+0.16%
1999	778	−0.13%
2007	829	+0.80%
2012	858	+0.69%
2017	794	−1.54%
2023	857	+1.28%
Source: INSEE

== See also ==
- Communes of the Corrèze department
