= Manuel Casesnoves Soler and Adela Soldevila Galiana =

Spanish couple

Servants of God Manuel Casesnoves Soler and Adela Soldevila Galiana
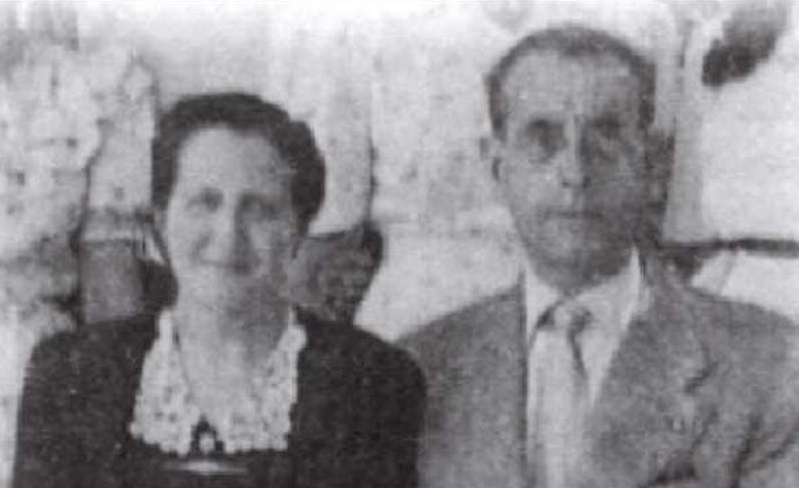
- Born: Manuel (30 June 1904, in Xàtiva); Adela (5 May 1906, in Xàtiva)
- Died: Manuel (24 May 1958, aged 53 in Xàtiva); Adela (3 March 1988, aged 81 in Xàtiva)
- Venerated in: Roman Catholic Church

Manuel Casesnoves Soler (30 June 1904 – 24 May 1958) and Adela Soldevila Galiana de Casesnoves, TOSD (5 May 1906 – 3 March 1988) were a Spanish couple from Xàtiva considered for beatification within the Roman Catholic Church.

== Biography ==
Manuel was born in Xàtiva on 30 June 1904, and Adela was born in the same city on 5 May 1906. They were neighbors and friends, since they went to the same school since they were children. Both of them entered the Xàtiva Institute. While still a student in pharmaceutical sciences, Manuel fell in love with Adele and she reciprocated – their friendship led to a courtship and later a wedding. They were married on 22 April 1927 and their marriage produced nine children.

In the difficult times of religious persecution in Spain (1934-1939), the couple suffered from seeing many of their friends killed for the mere fact of being priests or Catholic laymen. Manuel was enlisted as one of them and was almost killed. Providentially, the night the military were going to hunt him down, one of their workers who found out went to the Committee and told them bluntly and clearly:

"Don Manuel does a lot for the poor and for his workers. What you want to do is an outrage and you are making a very serious mistake, for which you will be held accountable one day."

The military confiscated the pharmacy, from which he helped the poor and needy, and also all his properties. However, despite the lack of means, they managed to bring up the family with simplicity, integrity and humility, giving an example of Christian life.

After the Civil War, Manuel and Adela had an enormous mission ahead of them: to heal wounds, spread peace and create a religious atmosphere everywhere. A long period of scarcity had begun; there was no money, resources were very scarce and it was almost impossible to achieve what was needed. The couple helped many people to overcome the difficult situation of the post-war period and they lived committed to the different movements of the Church: Catholic Action, Catholic Association of Propagandists, Night Adoration, Forty Hours, Caritas, the Conference of Saint Vincent. Everyone came to the pharmacy to ask for medicine and the charity of this man of God was so abundant that he gave everything they needed to many people who could not pay. When two of their children embrace religious life, they endlessly thanked the Lord.

Manuel was Deputy Mayor of the Xàtiva Town Council from 1940 to 1943 and a councilor until his death on 24 May 1958. He saw this service to the city as a way within his reach to work for social justice, according to the social doctrine of the Church in favor of those most in need.

Adela found herself supporting his large family, without neglecting her spiritual life and apostolic commitment. She also found time to jot down spiritual thoughts on her intense life with God. Manuel and Adela are an example of clear, generous, Christian love. She died on 3 March 1988.

== Beatification ==
On March 25, 2009, led by Cardinal Agustín García-Gasco Vicente, the Roman Catholic Archdiocese of Valencia initiated the joint beatification process of Manuel and Adela. Two priests, namely Fr. José Esparza, a Dominican priest, and Arturo Climent Bonafé, abbot of the Collegiate Church of Xàtiva and vice-postulator of the cause, were responsible for the research and compilation of testimonies about the Spanish couple. The latter published a book about the holy lives of the couple entitled La vida que cuenta el pueblo. Siervos de Dios, Manuel Casesnoves y Adela Soldevila.

On 29 April 2013, Archbishop Carlos Osoro Sierra closed the diocesan phase of the canonization process. This was the first diocesan process in the history of the Valencian archdiocese that seeks to conclude with the beatification of a couple. Currently, the postulator of their cause is Dr. Silvia Mónica Correale.
