= Thomas and Mary Poynton =

Thomas and Mary Kennedy Poynton

Thomas Poynton (1802 – 1892) and Mary Poynton (1812 – 1891) and their children were among the first Catholic families to settle in New Zealand. They were instrumental in bringing Bishop Jean Baptiste Pompallier to New Zealand and were involved in the growth of Catholicism and Catholic missions in the Hokianga and later on in the North Shore of Auckland.

== Early lives ==
Thomas Poynton was born in Ballivor, County Meath, Ireland. In his earlier life he was educated in France and later convicted of "Whiteboyism". He was transported to Sydney in 1822. Later he met Mary Kennedy, who had been born in Sydney, and was also from an Irish Catholic background, and they married.

== Move to New Zealand ==
In 1828, they moved to New Zealand. They were based in the Hokianga and lived in Papakawau. They still resided there at the time of the Treaty of Waitangi in 1840. They had three children, Mary Margaret (born 1830), Edward (born 1832) and Catherine (born 1836). There was no Catholic parish in New Zealand at the time so they travelled to Sydney to have their first two children baptised. In 1835 Thomas Poynton travelled to Sydney to ask for a Catholic priest to serve the Catholic community in New Zealand. In 1833 a decision had been made in the Vatican to appoint a Bishop to serve New Zealand and the surrounding Pacific Islands. Bishop Jean Baptiste Pompallier arrived on 10 January 1838 and stayed at the home of Thomas and Mary Poynton until his own house was established in Kororareka. With the Poynton family in the congregation, Pompallier celebrated the first Mass in New Zealand on 13 January 1838 at Totara Point, Hokianga.

== Later life ==
Thomas Poynton had made a very good income from the timber industry as a sawmill owner in the Hokianga. Later on Thomas and Mary Poynton owned a large amount of land in Takapuna and donated some of it to Bishop Pompallier in 1867. In 1899 a large plot of land was purchased by the Sisters of Mercy from Catherine Shea, the youngest of the Poynton children. The land owned by the Sisters of Mercy would eventually be used to build two Catholic schools, St Joseph's Takapuna primary school and Carmel College girls' secondary school, which sits on the edge of Lake Pupuke in Milford. Thomas and Mary Poynton are both buried in O'Neill's Point Cemetery on Auckland's North Shore.

== Legacy ==
On the North Shore, there is a Crescent named after Mary Poynton and there is a large retirement facility on Shakespeare Road named "The Poynton" after the family who had originally owned the land it is built on.
