= Carlo Tancredi Falletti di Barolo =

Italian Roman Catholic noble

Venerable Carlo Tancredi Falletti di Barolo
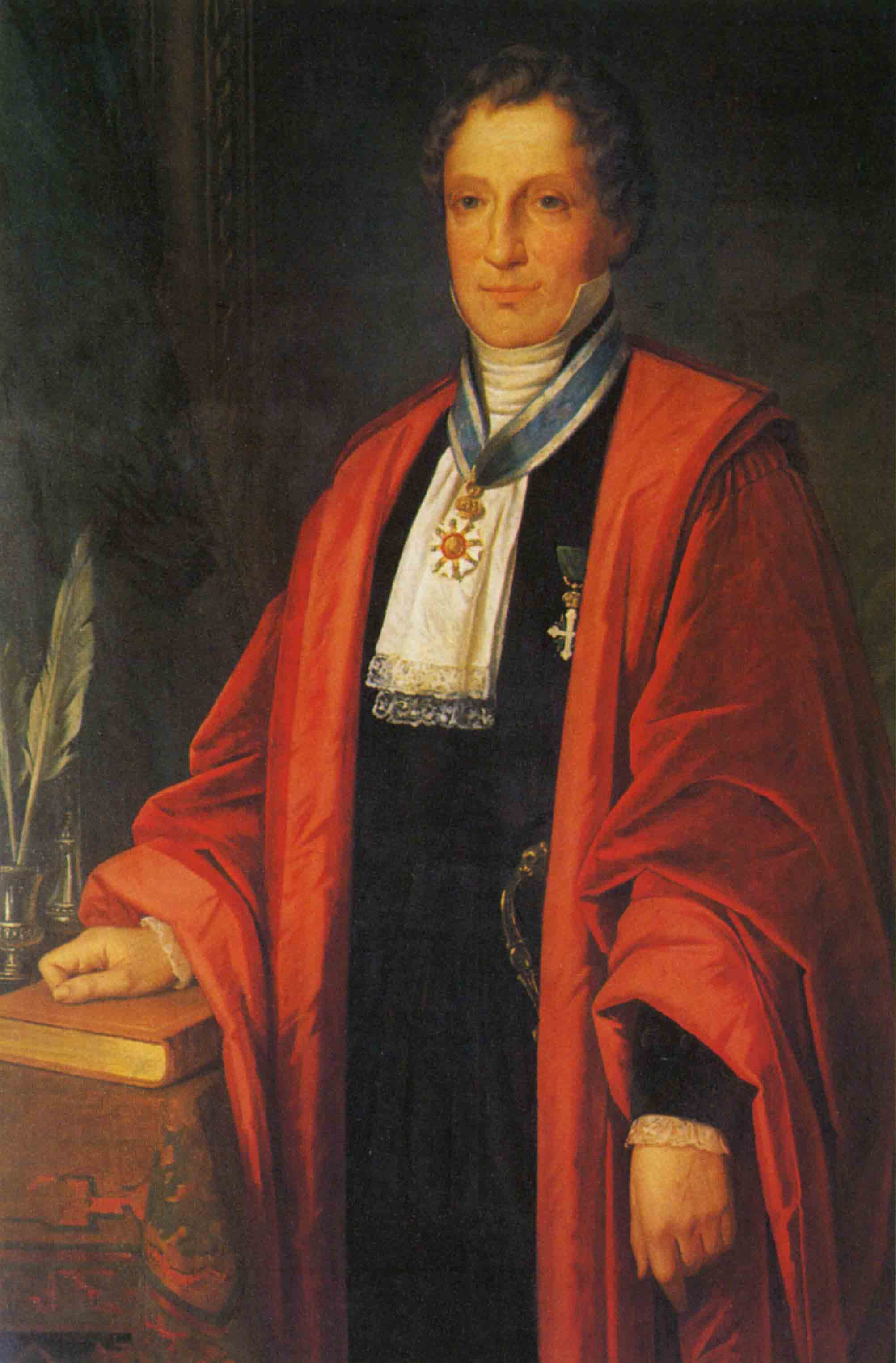

Layman; co-founder of the Sisters of Saint Anne
- Born: 26 October 1782; Turin, Kingdom of Sardinia
- Died: 4 September 1838 (aged 55); Chiari, Brescia, Kingdom of Lombardy–Venetia
- Resting place: Church of Santa Giulia, Turin, Italy
- Venerated in: Catholic Church
- Major shrine: Church of Santa Giulia, Turin

Carlo Tancredi Falletti di Barolo (26 October 1782 – 4 September 1838) was an Italian Roman Catholic noble who, with his wife Juliette Colbert, co-founded the Sisters of Saint Anne. Born and raised in Turin, Falletti came from a long line of nobles originally from France. He was admitted into the court of Napoleon Bonaparte where he would meet his future wife whom he married in 1806; he became a count in 1810 and relocated in 1814 to Turin with his wife where he became part of the local council and helped in infrastructure and educational developments.

Falletti's work extended to establishing a bank and a shelter for the children of poor workers while in 1835 he tended to victims of a cholera outbreak. His efforts in Turin during the epidemic as well as his other works saw him made a Commander of the Order of Saints Maurice and Lazarus.

His beatification process launched in Turin in 1995 and he became titled as a Servant of God. He was titled as Venerable on 21 December 2018 after Pope Francis acknowledged that Falletti had lived a life of heroic virtue; his wife had been named as such back in mid-2015.

== Life ==
Carlo Ippolito Ernesto Tancredi Maria Falletti was born in his parents' estate in Turin to the Barolo Marquess Ottavio Alessandro Falletti (27.7.1753-30.1.1828) and Paolina d'Oncieu (1760-1838) on 26 October 1782. He was the last descendant of the noble Falletti line.

In his childhood he was known for his intelligence as well as his sense of justice coupled with piousness. He was concerned with matters relating to social justice and these traits grew as he aged. But Falletti also possessed a strong will to promote and operate for the good of all. In his childhood he would often travel with his father to France as well as to other places such as the Netherlands and Switzerland.

He served Napoleon Bonaparte in his court and it was there in Paris that he met his future spouse Juliette Colbert who hailed from France; he was forced to move to Paris once Napoleon called back the emigrated French aristocrats to his side in order to better support his court. It was soon after his move to Paris that he entered the page corps before becoming a chamberlain in the Emperor's household. Falletti and Juliette became close over time and discovered both shared a deep faith and a desire to improve the lives of others and it was Prince Camillo Borghese who helped to mediate their union and engagement. The two soon married in Paris on 18 August 1806 and lived in Paris (he was named as a count in 1810) until Napoleon's fall in 1814 which forced their relocation to Turin. The couple lived there but would return to Paris from time to time since Juliette's relatives lived in France. The couple remained childless and so decided to adopt the Turin poor as their own seeing that their childlessness was a sign of providence. The pair decided to remain a chaste couple and realized through this came the desire to act as parents to the poor of Turin. In 1816 he was elected to the council of Turin and soon became a noted municipal official. In 1823 the couple received permission from the Kingdom of Piedmont-Sardinia to found a home for former female prisoners and reformed prostitutes. His wife would oversee management for that home while Falletti dedicated himself to his civic duties.

During the 1825-26 frigid winter season he distributed bread and firewood to the poor and established both a free school for artisanal crafts and a bank for small savings in 1827. Falletti served as the mayor of Turin at the request of King Carlo Felice during which time he dedicated himself to secular and religious educational needs of the citizens while taking on projects for the integral development of his people. It was during that timeframe that he founded homes for the children of poor workers and helped to pave new roads and establish new gardens and fountains for Turin's beautification. Falletti also set aside land that became the Cimitero Monumentale in 1828 and set aside a personal plot for himself and his wife. In 1834 he and Juliette co-founded the Sisters of Saint Anne which would be dedicated to education and tending to the poor and those in prisons.

In 1835 a cholera epidemic struck the Piedmont area and soon spread to Turin. Falletti organized help for the ill and set about establishing aid centers and infirmaries open to all people who required medical assistance. But he was overcome with fear that Juliette could be infected so allowed her to render aid to widows and children while forbidding her from going near contagious patients. But this fear soon decreased and he allowed her to tend to whomever she wished. Falletti's efforts - civic and during the epidemic - saw him made a commander in the Order of Saints Maurice and Lazarus; but his efforts during the epidemic saw him exhausted and he once confided to Juliette: "I have confidence that Providence will arrange for me to leave first".

His health started to decline due to exhaustion and his doctors recommended that he travel to Austria in order to recuperate. But the couple stopped first in Verona hoping the alpine air would aid his recuperation when his condition deteriorated (struck with a violent fever) to the point that Juliette believed it would be best to return to Turin. But his condition had declined to the point that the couple had to stop in Chiari in Brescia where he received the extreme unction before he died during the night on 4 September 1838 in his wife's arms. His funeral was celebrated in the church of San Dalmazio in Turin, with a large crowd of poor people in attendance. Falletti's remains were interred in the plot he had set for himself but were later relocated in 2013 to rest besides the remains of his wife (which had been moved back in 1899) in the Santa Giulia church in Vanchiglia in metropolitan Turin. In 2008 his congregation of Sisters of Sainte Anne counted 1262 religious in 174 houses in places such as Cameroon and the Philippines; the general headquarters of the congregation is located in Rome.

== Beatification process ==
The Sisters of Saint Anne held their 29th General Chapter in Rome in 1990 and it led to an explicit mention of launching a possible beatification process for the Falletti couple. The postulator for this cause since 22 February 1992 is the Capuchin friar Paolino Rossi. In March 1993 the postulator]approached the Cardinal Archbishop of Turin, Giovanni Saldarini, asking to introduce the cause; the postulator soon after appointed Sisters Renza Peira and Nelly Grasso as joint vice-postulators and later Sister Felicia Frascogna after Peira died in 1999. The diocesan process was launched in Turin on 8 February 1995 and concluded its business on 21 December 2002; Falletti became titled as a Servant of God on 7 March 1995 when the Congregation for the Causes of Saints issued the official "nihil obstat" (no objections) decree which acted as a green-light for the cause.

Falletti became titled as venerable on 21 December 2018 after Pope Francis confirmed that the late nobleman had lived a life of heroic virtue. Falletti's wife Juliette was titled as Venerable on 5 May 2015.

== See also ==
- List of mayors of Turin
