= Almonacid del Marquesado =

- Municipality
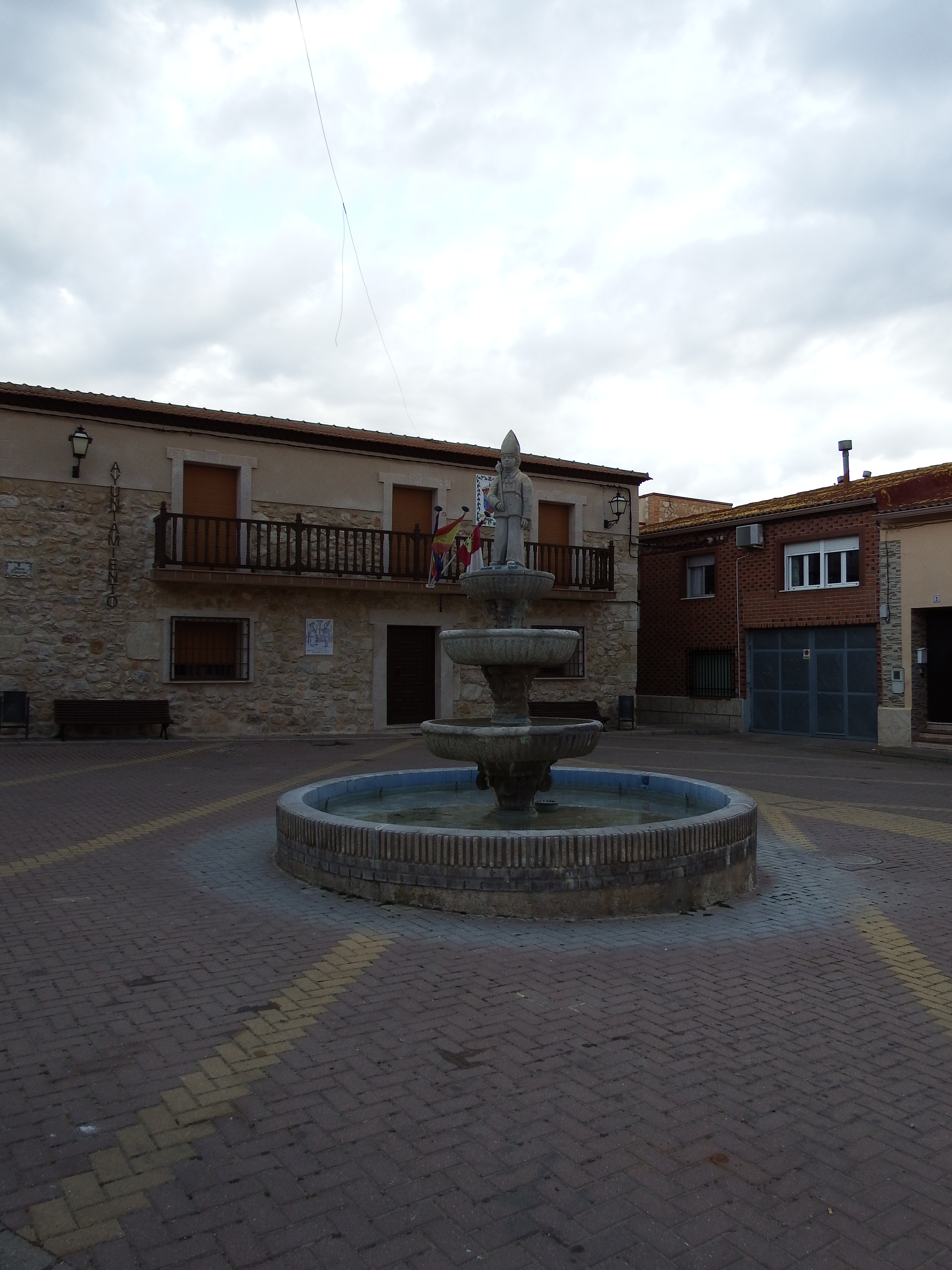

- Coat of arms

- Location within Spain Location within Castilla-La Mancha
- Coordinates: 39.823333°N 2.766944°W
- Country: Spain
- Autonomous community: Castile-La Mancha
- Province: Cuenca

Population (2025-01-01)
  - Total: 412
- Time zone: UTC+1 (CET)
  - Summer (DST): UTC+2 (CEST)

Almonacid del Marquesado is a municipality in Cuenca, Castile-La Mancha, Spain. It had a population of 432 as of 2020.
