= Lopushna, Lviv Oblast =

Rural locality in Lviv Oblast, Ukraine

Lopushna Лопушна
- Village
- Location within Lviv Oblast
- Coordinates: 49°39′00″N 24°08′51″E
- Country: Ukraine
- Oblast: Lviv Oblast
- District: Lviv Raion
- Established: 1508

Area
  - Total: 204 km^{2} (79 sq mi)
- Elevation /(average value of): 304 m (997 ft)

Population
  - Total: 282
  - Density: 13,824/km^{2} (35,800/sq mi)
- Time zone: UTC+2 (EET)
  - Summer (DST): UTC+3 (EEST)
- Postal code: 81227
- Area code: +380 3263
- Website: село Лопушна ^{(Ukrainian)}

Lopushna (Ukrainian: Лопу́шна) is a village in Lviv Raion, Lviv Oblast in western Ukraine. It is situated in the distance 28 kilometres (17 mi) from the regional center of Lviv and 56 kilometres (35 mi) from Peremyshliany. Lopushna belongs to Bibrka urban hromada, one of the hromadas of Ukraine. Area of the village totals 2,04 km^{2}, and the population of the village is just about 282 people. Local government is administered by Sukhodilska village council.

== History and Attractions ==
The first known written reference about the village Lopushna is date to 1508.

Until 18 July 2020, Lopushna belonged to Peremyshliany Raion. The raion was abolished in July 2020 as part of the administrative reform of Ukraine, which reduced the number of raions of Lviv Oblast to seven. The area of Peremyshliany Raion was merged into Lviv Raion.

The village has an architectural monument of local importance of Peremyshliany Raion – of Resurrection of Christ Church that was built in 1924 (2338-М).

== Literature ==
- Ukrainian: Історія міст і сіл УРСР : Львівська область. – К. : ГРУРЕ, 1968 р. Перемишлянський район, Суходіл Page 573
