= Villaralto =

- Municipality
- Seal
- Interactive map of Villaralto
- Country: Spain
- Province: Córdoba
- Municipality: Villaralto

Area
  - Total: 23 km^{2} (8.9 sq mi)
- Elevation: 585 m (1,919 ft)

Population (2025-01-01)
  - Total: 1,059
  - Density: 46/km^{2} (120/sq mi)
- Time zone: UTC+1 (CET)
  - Summer (DST): UTC+2 (CEST)

Villaralto is located in the province of Córdoba, Spain. According to the 2018 census (INE), the town had a population of 1,154 inhabitants. Its area covers 24.07 km^{2} and has a population density of 49.69 inhabitants per km^{2}. Its geographical coordinates are 38º 27' N, 4º 59' W and is located at an altitude of 585 metres and 80 kilometres from the provincial capital, Cordoba.

Villaralto is a municipality bordering El Viso, Hinojosa del Duque, Alcaracejos, Dos Torres and Villanueva del Duque. Its most emblematic building is in the parish of San Pedro Apóstol, with three naves and an 18th-century tower. The best known festival is the pilgrimage of the Divine Pastora that takes place on the riverbanks of the Guadamatilla on the first Sunday in May. The economy is based on livestock, agriculture, some industry and various commercial establishments.

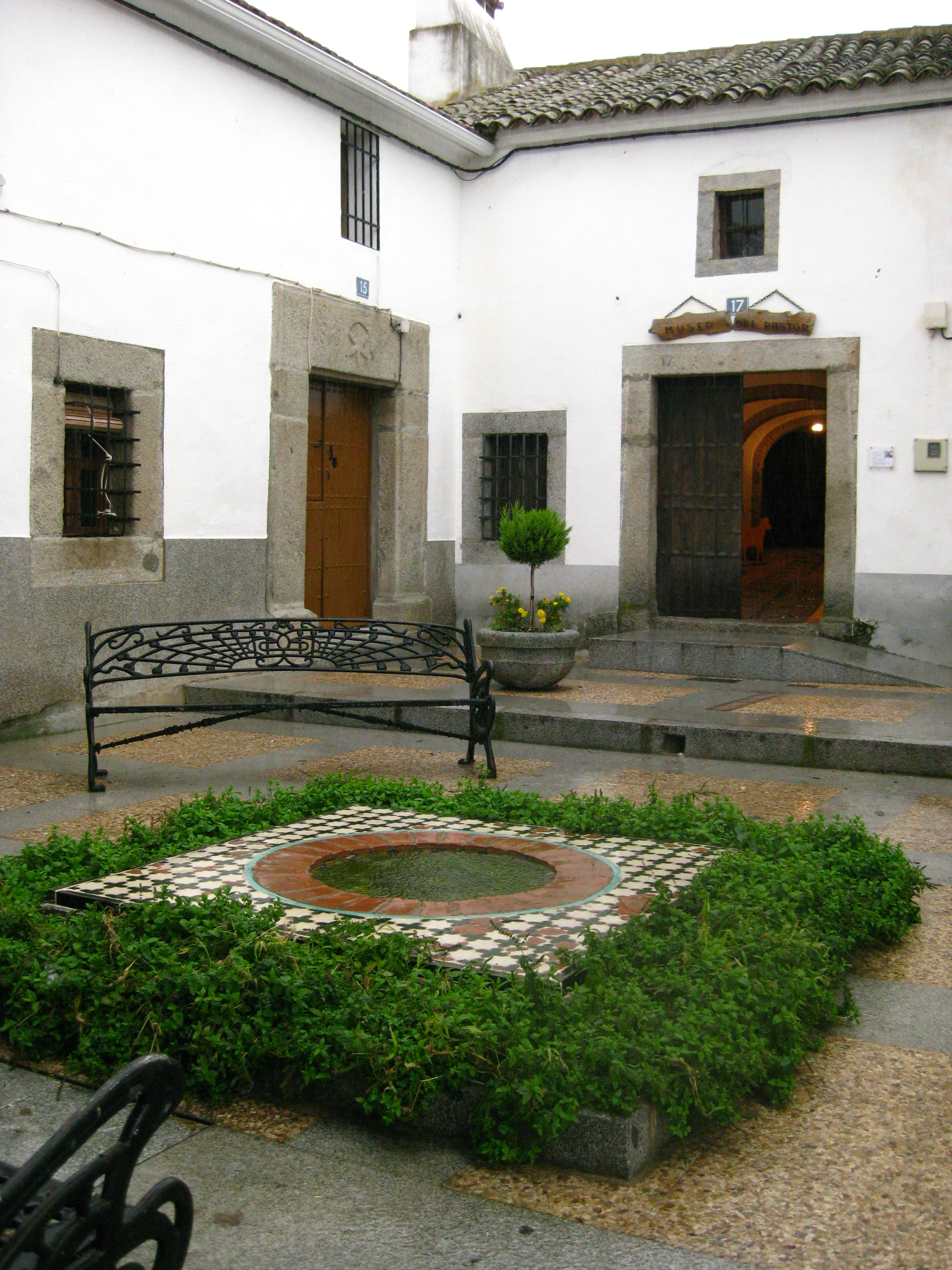
Villaralto

== History ==
=== Prehistory and Antiquity ===
The town has several prehistoric, Roman, Arab and Visigoth settlements. The archaeological sites include the Rincon de Berrocoso, located to the northwest, where there are the remains of what is presumed to be a Roman camp or a Roman secondary road. There is an abundance of slate slabs, mineral slags, remains of pots and an Arabic silver coin that have been found in the town. The Ladrillar is an old lead mine, evidenced by the discovery of mineral slags from said metal. In Laguna del Prieto three millwheels with a radius of around 25 centimetres have been discovered and are now preserved in the City Hall. In Cerrocampo there are mineral slags and remains of pots, from an old settlement associated with copper or lead mining. However, the most noteworthy place is the so-called Casa de la Mora, located southeast of the town, in which there was a Roman villa, later occupied by the Arabs, linked with mining activity. Here the findings have been abundant, including the discovery of a treasure trove full of silver coins and a large number of Roman copper coins. Nowadays there are many fragments of ceramics, Roman tiles, mineral slags, etc. There are even remnants of a wall of lime and flint that must have belonged to an Arab construction. This site was the subject of an official visit of archaeologists in March 1985. In Villaralto there are also a large number of Visigoth granite sarcophagi, with a trapezoidal or anthropomorphic shape, which have been moved from their original location and have been used as drinking troughs for cattle. For this reason, most of them are close to wells, such as the three sarcophagi at Pozo de las Cadenas, Pozo de las Cinco Pilas, and Pozo de la Laguna de la Torrica, altogether up to a total of about 20 that are mostly eroded and worn. There are also infant sarcophagi, one of which is preserved and has also been used in the same way. Many of them have disappeared as a result of pillaging and lack of interest in preserving them when various renovations have taken place in their locations.

=== Middle Ages and Modern History ===
The history of Villaralto as it is now known comes much later. The first document that refers to the town of Villaralto is from the year 1424 (at that time having some 3000 inhabitants) in which Juan Ruiz de Santofimia was eager to incorporate it into the Señorío de Santa Eufemia, an act that was unsuccessful. Villaralto emerged in the fifteenth century as a dependent village of Torremilano (now Dos Torres), belonging to the seven towns of Los Pedroches, a region that also incorporated Pozoblanco, Añora, Alcaracejos, Villanueva de Córdoba, Pedroche and Torrecampo. Los Pedroches was under royal jurisdiction in which the territory of all of them was shared and governed communally until the partition in the nineteenth century. In Villaralto, residents from that town are installed to closely monitor payments for vineyards and cattle. According to census information issued by the Diocese of Córdoba in 1587, Villaralto had 83 inhabitants and one font. Villaralto's dependency on Torremilano remained until 1633. On July 28, 1633, Villaralto was sold by King Felipe IV to Don Melchor Fernández Carreras, archdeacon of the Pedroches and Canon of Córdoba Cathedral (who had to first obtain a certificate of blood purity). The assigned price was 1,632,000 silver maravedis. On September 17, 1633, the first census of inhabitants of Villaralto is carried out, indicating the start of a municipal boundary. This gave rise to a serious and long dispute with Torremilano, who opposed the independence of Villaralto and were resistant to allowing the new town. Despite all the impediments, Melchor Fernández Carreras took possession of the town on September 15 in the same year, thus constituting a new administrative entity, the Señorío de Villaralto, which remains until the abolition of the jurisdictional lordships in 1837. Torremilano sends a letter to the King and Queen of Spain claiming that Villaralto de Torremilano was not independent, and even less a boundary of the Seven Towns since according to the letter, the assigned boundary entered into the pasture of Peña Alta (communal lands of the Seven Towns). On December 20, 1638, the judges ruled in favour of Villaralto in whose documents Villaralto's independence was recognized and its own boundary permanently set while urging the Señorío de Villaralto to pay the sale of the town. In 1771, the town of Villaralto receives letters from the Treasury in which they urge payment of the taxes appropriate to the town as an independent for the first time amounting to 1,770 maravedis. Despite the confrontation with Torremilano, both peoples maintained communication, as evidenced by documents on various subjects: fines, taxes, communications, etc. Even Villaralto, in the distribution of goods produced by the communal lands of the Seven Towns, received part of them, though it was not yet established as a municipal town. This irritates Torremilano who continually denounces Villaralto for using the Public Property of the Seven Towns (extensive estates such as Navas del Emperador or the estate of la Jara) for livestock exploitation and, above all, for the limits of the municipality of Villaralto, with which Torremilano did not agree. These disputes continue throughout the 18th century. With regard to the economy, in 1752 Villaralto had 5 textile mills and two factories, one of baize and one of cloths.

=== Recent History ===
In 1812, the town's records show the following: 179 head of cattle, 156 sows, 555 goats and 148 mules among others. It has 259 top quality bushels for crops, second 631 and has 186 houses. In 1876, Villaralto had a population of 1853. There are many gaps in the history of this town due to the destruction of records in the Spanish Civil War. Information regarding Francoism and democracy, however, is preserved.

== Artistic Heritage ==
=== The Parish of San Pedro ===
The church of San Pedro dates from the foundational period (15th century) of which the exterior facade is preserved, with decorated arches made of granite. Multiple alterations increased the area occupied by the temple, going from one nave to three, establishing two smaller sides with chapels, one covered by a dome. As a pictorial and sculptural heritage, it is worth highlighting the size of the polychrome olive tree of the Divine Pastora, from the 18th century, a Baroque style painting by Sebastián de Llanos Valdés from the 17th century representing Saint Paul the Hermit, the image of the Patroness, the Virgin of the Good Success, which replaces another ancient carving destroyed during the Civil War and the baroque altarpiece where this image is found. This altarpiece comes from the Cordovan church of San Basilio, since after the Civil War the archive, the images, the objects of worship and even the bells were destroyed or plundered making it necessary to bring items from other places. However, the parish tower is a prominent element of the church, constituting one of the symbols of Villaralto. With a height of approximately 17 metres, it consists of a prismatic granite shaft, a bell body with four semicircular arches, although only two have them. Above this is an octagonal point (which contains the clock) surrounded by four curved granite ornaments at the top. The tower has a conical finish. Dating from the mid-eighteenth century, it was restored in 1992. The work included the removal of brickwork and restoration of the original granite, replacement of the clock, consolidation of the structure, recasting of the bells and their electrification, cleaning of the exterior and interior and replacement of ornaments.

=== Other Heritage ===
Other religious buildings in Villaralto include the chapel of Santa Rita, built into a square in 1900 and the chapel of Cristo de las Angustias of similar structure.

== Traditions and Festivals ==
Traditions in Villaralto are followed all year round. During Holy Week there are various processions, such as the Hermandades del Sepulcro, Las Angustias and the "Borriquita". However, the most important festival of this town is the Romería de la Divina Pastora, which is celebrated on the first Sunday of May on the riverbanks of the Guadamatilla. The Virgin is accompanied to the riverbank with beautiful and original floats made of various materials. The women are dressed in typical shepherdess costume. Other traditions are the massacre and the "Judas" celebrated on Easter Sunday in which young people destroy stick figures representing Judas Iscariot made by the locals who hang them from their balconies. Typically houses of Villaralto are characterized by functionality over aesthetics, with granite lintels, and stables and pigsties to store animals. An example of preservation is the splendid Pastor's Museum, opened a few years ago. The museum's exhibits show the shepherds' way of life in various rooms that correspond to the structure of a typical villaraltan house.

== Economy ==
Villaralto's economy is based mainly in the primary sector, with farms for agricultural and livestock exploitation. The most widespread crops are cereal, namely wheat and barley. There is also cultivation of olive groves and the procurement of products derived from oak. The main livestock is sheep and cattle and its commercialization is carried out for the most part, by the company COVAP, located in Pozoblanco. Industry barely affects the global economy, however it is worth mentioning the presence of workshops including metalwork, woodworking, marble treatment and, in particular, the manufacturing of containers for materials recycling "Tegui Medioambiental SL", which also has another headquarters in the province of Toledo. There is a company producing organic eggs, as well as a cheese factory. In the tertiary sector, commercial activity is grouped in small shops in the town centre, with grocery stores, clothing, footwear and hardware to meet the basic needs of the inhabitants. There is no lack of leisure facilities and restaurants in the town, traditional bars, with coffee shops and a pub. A visit to one of the restaurants to taste the delicious suckling pig or fried cod is recommended.

== Villaralto at the Cinema ==
Villaralto is mentioned several times in the film "La Marrana" (1992) directed by José Luis Cuerda starring Alfredo Landa and Antonio Resines among others.

== Administration and Local Government ==
Since the first municipal elections held in 1979, after the approval of the Spanish Constitution of 1978, the following people have held the mayor's office:

List of mayors since the democratic elections of 1979
| Term of Office | Name of Mayor | Party | Control |
|---|---|---|---|
| 1979–1983 | Juan Jesús Gómez Moreno | PSOE | Absolute Majority |
| 1983–1987 | Juan Jesús Gómez Moreno | PSOE | Supermajority |
| 1987–1991 | Juan Jesús Gómez Moreno | PSOE | Absolute Majority |
| 1991–1995 | Manuel Gómez Gómez | IU | Absolute Majority |
| 1995–1999 | Manuel Gómez Gómez | IU | Supermajority |
| 1999–2003 | Manuel Gómez Gómez | IU | Supermajority |
| 2003–2007 | Manuel Gómez Gómez | IU | Supermajority |
| 2007–2011 | Manuel Gómez Gómez | IU | Absolute Majority |
| 2011–2015 | Manuel Gómez Gómez (Until his death, 4 October 2012); Ángel Gómez Fernández | IU | Simple Majority |
| 2015–2019 | Ángel Gómez Fernández | IU | Supermajority |
| 2019– | Ángel Moreno Gómez | IU | Simple Majority |

== See also ==
- List of municipalities in Córdoba
