= Miss Grand Spain 2022 =

7th Miss Grand Spain competition, beauty pageant edition

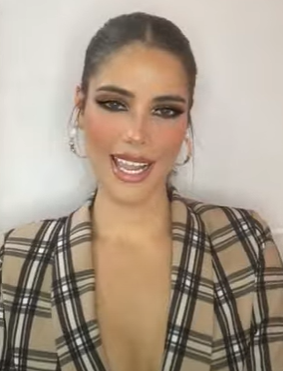
- Hirisley Jimenez, the winner of the contest
- Date: 2 May 2022
- Presenters: Roberto Herrera
- Entertainment: Cristina Ramos
- Venue: South Park Auditorium, Maspalomas, Las Palmas
- Broadcaster: YouTube
- Entrants: 34
- Placements: 15
- Debuts: Costa Cantábrica; Euskadi; Girona; Islas Afortunadas; La Rioja; Lleida
- Withdrawals: Asturias; Baleares; País Vasco; Palencia
- Returns: Cantabria; Murcia; Toledo; Valencia; Zaragoza
- Winner: Hirisley Jiménez; Las Palmas
- Congeniality: Iratxe Francés; Navarre

External videos
- Miss Grand Spain Grand Final Competition, on 2 May 2022, YouTube video

Miss Grand Spain 2022 (Spanish: Miss Grand España 2022) is the sixth edition of Miss Grand Spain beauty contest, held at South Park Auditorium of Maspalomas in Las Palmas Province on 2 May 2022. The Miss Grand Spain 2021 Alba Dunkenberck of Costa Canaria crowned her successor, a Cuban-Spanish Hirisley Jiménez of Las Palmas, at the end of the event. Jiménez then represented Spain at the Miss Grand International 2022 pageant held on October 25 in Indonesia, and was named the fifth runner-up.

Thirty-four delegates who qualified via the provincial contests competed for the national title. The event was hosted by "Roberto Herrera" and was beamed live to a virtual audience worldwide via the pageant YouTube channel, named GrandSpainTV. The event was also attended by Nguyễn Thúc Thùy Tiên Miss Grand International 2021 and "Teresa Chaivisut", the vice president of Miss Grand International.

In addition to crowning the country representative, Miss Grand Spain 2023 was announced to be happening in Puerto de la Cruz in the Province of Santa Cruz de Tenerife, three consecutive years for the Canary Islands to host the pageant.

== Background ==
=== History ===
On 1 January 2022, the pageant organizer published the announcement of the 2022 competition host province on their social media, the contest is scheduled to happen on 2 May at South Park Auditorium of Maspalomas in the province of Las Palmas. The official press conference of the contest was later conducted on 20 April at Hotel Orquídea Club and Spa in Bahía Feliz, in which other competition details was additionally clarified such as the competition system, sub-contests as well as the pageant activities.

List of the main events in the Miss Grand Spain 2022 pageant
| Date | Event | Venue | Ref. |
|---|---|---|---|
| 20 April | Official Press Conference | Hotel Orquídea Club and Spa, Bahía Feliz | |
| 28 April | Swimsuit competition | Holiday World entertainment center, Maspalomas | |
| 1 May | Preliminary competition | South Park Auditorium, Maspalomas | |
| 2 May | Grand Final Coronation | South Park Auditorium, Maspalomas | |

=== Selection of contestants ===
Thirty-four national delegates were selected to participate by their regional licensees, 23 of which obtained the title after winning the respective local pageants, while 10 runners-up of those local pageants were additionally appointed to represent the neighboring provinces due to a lacking of provincial directors. The remainder 1 candidate, Mar Pallini, who previously obtained second place at Miss Grand Barcelona 2020, was elected to represent the province of Lleida without participating in any 2022 regional contests.

In the province of Barcelona, local pageants are also held in Anoia, Baix Llobregat, and Osona, to determine delegates for the province competition.

Map shows provinces that held the regional contest for Miss Grand Spain 2022 (Click on a province name on the map to go to that name in the table below)
Color keys for the number of title qualified to the national pageant

| 1 provincial title 2 provincial titles 3 provincial titles | Local contest (preliminary for the provincial stage) No pageant held in the region |

List of Miss Grand Spain 2022 regional pageants, by the coronation date
| Location | Level | Date & Venue | Entrants | Title(s) | Ref. |
|---|---|---|---|---|---|
| Seville | Provincial | 5 September 2021 at Abades Benacazón Hoteles, Benacazón | 16 Cities: Alcalá del Río; Aljarafe; Coria del Río; Esquivel; Others (Data Not Available) | 1 title: Miss Grand Seville | |
| Cádiz | Provincial | 25 September 2021 at Monasterio de la Victoria, El Puerto de Santa María | 16 Cities: Alcalá de los Gazules; Algeciras; Algodonales; Arcos de la Frontera; Bahía de Cádiz; Campiña de Jerez; Campo de Gibraltar; Capital; Chiclana de la Frontera; Puerto de Santa María; Jerez de la Frontera; La Janda; Puerto Real; Puerto Sherry; San José del Valle; Sierra de Cádiz | 3 titles: Miss Grand Cádiz; Miss Grand Andalusia; Miss Grand Costa de la Luz | |
| Huelva | Provincial | 25 September 2021 at Recinto Ferial Villarrasa, Villarrasa | 16 Cities: Aljaraque; Andévalo; Ayamonte; Capital; Doñana; Guadiana; Huelva; Isla Cristina; Lepe; Manzanilla; Moguer; Sierra de Huelva; Trigueros; Valverde del Camino | 1 title: Miss Grand Huelva | |
| Granada | Provincial | 3 October 2021 at San Sebastián Park, Ogíjares | 49 Cities: Albolote; Albuñol; Alfacar; Alhama de Granada; Alhendín; Almuñécar; Armilla; Atarfe; Baza; Calahonda; Carchuna; Cenes de la Vega; Chauchina; Cúllar Vega; Churriana; Deifontes; Dílar; Dúrcal; Padul; Freila; Gójar; Guadix; Güevéjar; Huétor de Santillán; Huétor Vega; Íllora; Iznalloz; La Herradura; La Zubia; Maracena; Monachil; Montefrío; Motril; Las Gabias; Loja; Loma Linda; Ogíjares; Otura; Pinos Puente; Polopos; Pulianas; Purullena; Rubite; Salar; Salobreña; Santa Fé; Torrenueva Costa; Valderrubio; Vegas del Genil | 1 title: Miss Grand Granada | |
| Toledo | Provincial | 16 October 2021 at Hotel Abaceria, Toledo | 24 Candidates | 2 titles: Miss Grand Madrid; Miss Grand Toledo | |
| Pontevedra | Community | 28 October 2021 at Hotel Bahía de Vigo, Pontevedra | 15 Cities: Arousa; Cíes; Cortegada; Estelas; Gavoteira; Ínsua Bela; La Toja; Ons; Sálvora; San Pedro; San Simón; Santa Comba; Santa Cruz; Tambo; Toralla | 3 titles: Miss Grand Galicia; Miss Grand Costa Gallega; Miss Grand Costa Cantárica | |
| Biscay | Community | 5 November 2021 at Bilbao Exhibition Centre, Barakaldo | 21 Cities: Abando; Basurto; Derio; Eibar; Etxebarri; Galdakao; Gros; Irala; Irun; Ispaster; Lakua; Laudio; Oiartzun; Ondarroa; Orio; Plentzia; Rekalde; Santutxu; San Martin; San Ignazio; Sopelana | 1 title: Miss Grand Euskadi | |
| Málaga | Provincial | 20 November 2021 at the Edgar Neville auditorium of the Diputación de Málaga | 24 Cities: Alhaurín de la Torre; Bahía de Málaga; Bailén-Miraflores; Benalmádena; Cártama; Cruz de Humilladero; El Calvario; El Cónsul; El Torcal; Gibralfaro; Huelin; La Carihuela; La Malagueta; Marbella; Mijas; Montemar; Ojén; Pedregalejo; Rincón de la Victoria; Puerto Marina; Ronda; Torre del Mar; Torremolinos; Torrox | 2 titles: Miss Grand Málaga; Miss Grand Costa del Sol | |
| Barcelona | Provincial | 27 November 2021 at Sarau 08911 Club, Badalona, Barcelona | 25 Cities: Alt Penedès; Anoia; Bages; Baix Llobregat; Barcelonès; Berguedà; Ciutat Vella; Costa Central; Eixample; Garraf; Gràcia; Guinardó; Horta; Les Corts; Maresme; Moianès; Montjuïc; Nou Barris; Sant Andreu; Sant Gervasi; Sant Martí; Sants; Sarrià; Vallès Occidental; Vallès Oriental | 2 titles: Miss Grand Barcelona; Miss Grand Tarragona | |
| Córdoba | Provincial | 28 November 2021 at Hacienda La Piconera, Córdoba | 30 Cities: Aguilar; Alcolea; Almodóvar; Añora; Baena; Cañete; Cardeña; Córdoba Capital; Encinarejo; Fernán Núñez; Guadalcázar; Hinojosa del Duque; La Carlota; La Rambla; La Victoria; Lucena; Montalbán; Montemayor; Montoro; Nueva Carteya; Palma del Río; Pedro Abad; Posadas; Pozoblanco; Priego; Puente Genil; Santa Cruz; Villanueva de Córdoba; Villanueva del Duque; Villa del Río | 1 title: Miss Grand Córdoba | |
| Girona | Provincial | 5 December 2021 at Municipal Auditorium, Santa Coloma de Farners | 15 Cities: Arbúcies; Blanes; Caldes de Malavella; Figueres; La Bisbal d'Empordà; La Selva de Mar; Llançà; Maçanet de la Selva; Palamós; Riudarenes; Roses; Santa Coloma de Farners; Santa Coloma Residencial; Sant Gregori; Sarrià de Ter | 1 title: Miss Grand Girona | |
| Las Palmas | Provincial | 12 December 2021 at the Maspalomas Cultural Center, Maspalomas | 20 Cities: Agaete; Agüimes; Arucas; Artenara; Fuerteventura; Gáldar; Ingenio; La Graciosa; Lanzarote; Las Palmas; Mogán; San Bartolomé de Tirajana; Santa Brígida; Santa Lucía; Santa María de Guía; Tejeda; Telde; Teror; Valsequillo | 3 titles: Miss Grand Las Palmas; Miss Grand Costa Canaria; Miss Grand Atlántico | |
| Badajoz | Community | 23 January 2022 at Teatro Carolina Coronado, Almendralejo | 12 Cities: Almendralejo; Badajoz Capital; Campanario; Castuera; Cáceres Capital; Don Benito; Jaraíz de la Vera; La Serena; Jerte; Mérida; Plasencia; Jaraíz de la Vera | 1 title: Miss Grand Extremadura | |
| Zaragoza | Provincial | 18 February 2022 at Teatro de las Esquinas, Zaragoza | 16 Candidates | 1 title: Miss Grand Zaragoza | |
| Valencia | Community | 20 February 2022 at Sala Madison, Massanassa | 17 Candidates | 1 title: Miss Grand Valencian | |
| Murcia | Community | 27 February 2022 at Hotel NH Amistad Murcia | 12 Candidates | 1 title: Miss Grand Murcia | |
| Cantabria | Provincial | 6 March 2022 at Pub Dalí Santander, Santander | 18 Cities: Cabezón de la Sal; Astillero; Bárcena de Pie de Concha; Camargo; Carandía; Comillas; El Sardinero; Isla; La Concha de Villaescusa; Maliaño; Miengo; Peñacastillo; Piélagos; Reinosa; Santa Cruz de Bezana; Selaya; Somo; Torrelavega | 1 title: Miss Grand Cantabria | |
| Jaén | Provincial | 20 March 2022 at Salon Yerba Buena, Martos | 15 Candidates | 1 title: Miss Grand Jaén | |
| Tenerife | Provincial | 20 March 2022 at Orfeon La Paz, San Cristóbal de La Laguna | 17 Cities: Arafo; Candelaria; El Rosario; Guía de Isora; Güímar; La Laguna; La Matanza; La Orotava; La Palma; La Victoria; Puerto de la Cruz; Respol Grupo Gonzalez; Rest El Picú; Santa Cruz; Tacoronte; Ricardo; Tegueste | 2 titles: Miss Grand Tenerife]; Miss Grand Islas Afortunadas | |
| La Rioja | Provincial | 26 March 2022 at Bodegas y Viñedos Heras Cordón, Fuenmayor | 10 Candidates | 1 title: Miss Grand La Rioja | |
| Almería | Provincial | 27 March 2022 at Terraza del hotel HO, Puerta de Purchena | 12 Cities: Adra; Almería Capital; Cabo de Gata; Carboneras; Aguadulce; Mojácar; El Ejido; Huércal de Almería; Níjar; Roquetas de Mar; Vélez-Rubio; Vícar | 1 title: Miss Grand Almería] | |
| Ciudad Real | Provincial | 27 March 2022 at Hotel Sercotel Guadiana, Ciudad Real | 10 Candidates | 1 title: Miss Grand Ciudad Real | |
| Navarre | Community | 27 March 2022 at Hotel NH Pamplona Iruña Park, Pamplona | 13 Candidates | 1 title: Miss Grand Navarre | |

== Main Pageant ==
=== Preliminary activities ===
- Pre-pageant voting:

Evening Gown Voting Result
| Rank | Province | Point |
|---|---|---|
| 1. | Navarra | 1,394 |
| 2. | Huelva | 1,167 |
| 3. | Cádiz | 1,144 |
| 4. | Jaén | 1,117 |
| 5. | Cantabria | 1,098 |
| 6. | Zaragoza | 1,088 |

Swimsuit Voting Result
| Rank | Province | Point |
|---|---|---|
| 1. | Jaén | 1,058 |
| 2. | Navarra | 1,046 |
| 3. | Atlántico | 990 |
| 4. | Cádiz | 988 |

Gala Dinner Voting Result
| Rank | Province | Point |
|---|---|---|
| 1. | Cantabria | 1,113 |
| 2. | Euskadi | 1,022 |
| 3. | Navarra | 964 |
| 4. | Huelva | 954 |
| 5. | Cádiz | 893 |

- Swimsuit contest: held on 28 April at Holiday World entertainment center in Maspalomas where all 34 aspirants paraded in a swimwear one by one in front of the panel of judges, the representative of Euskadi, "Oihana Torres", was named the winner at the grand final round on 2 May and automatically placed in the top 10 finalists of the final competition, regardless of all accumulation scores.
- Preliminary competition: held on 1 May at the South Park Auditorium of Maspalomas, where all 34 contestants competed in swimwear and evening gowns in front of a panel of preliminary judges. The scores from the preliminary event, together with a closed-door interview portion, the swimsuit competition as well as the scoring via all ancillary activities, determines the top 15 finalists who were later announced on the grand final stage on 2 May.

=== Grand Final ===
The grand final round of Miss Grand Spain 2022 was held on the night of 2 May at South Park Auditorium of Maspalomas city in Las Palmas, hosted by "Roberto Herrera" and was beamed live to a virtual audience worldwide via the pageant YouTube channel, named GrandSpainTV. As the tradition of the pageant, 15 semifinalists are chosen from the initial pool of contestants through observation during the entire pageant, a closed-door interview, swimsuit round as well as a preliminary competition, which featured contestants competing in swimsuits and evening gowns. The top 15 finalists were then competed in the swimsuit round, with 10 of them advancing to the Top 10, this number eventually was reduced to 9 with the 10th semifinalist being the "Best in Swimsuit" winner determined through the swimsuit contest previously held on 28 April, all 10 semifinalists would then compete in an evening gown and the top 5 finalists were decided.

The top five then competed in the question-and-answer portion, where each entrant was asked a different question. The judges select the winner based on their answer, then the host sequentially announced the fourth, third, and second runners-up. The last 2 candidates from Las Palmas and Euskadi then stand in the center of the stage and the Las Palmas representative was named "Miss Grand Spain 2022".

The panel of judges includes:

- Drag Valcano – Drag Queen 2022 of the Las Palmas de Gran Canaria Carnival
- Janet González Carballo – Medical director and orthodontist
- Blas García – Official surgeon of Miss Grand Spain
- Nguyễn Thúc Thùy Tiên – Miss Grand International 2021
- Teresa Chaivisut – Vice-president of Miss Grand International Ltd.
- Vicente Jiménez – President of Miss Grand Spain

== Results ==
=== Placements ===
Miss Grand Spain 2022 competition result
| Position | Delegate |
|---|---|
| Miss Grand Spain 2022 | Las Palmas – Hirisley Jiménez |
| 1st runner-up | Euskadi – Oihana Torres |
| 2nd runner-up | Zaragoza – Anakristina Rivero |
| 3rd runner-up | Madrid – Kristina Caci |
| 4th runner-up | Granada – Natalia Quirós |
| Semifinalists (Top 10) | Cádiz – Alba Pérez; Cantabria – María Pardo; Costa Canaria – Maryana Abreu; Murcia – Miriam Avilés; Valencia – Erika Pereira |
| Quarterfinalists (Top 15) | Almería – Gigi Mendes; Andalusia – Elisabeth Ros; Costa de la Luz – María Moreno; Sevilla – Maria Domínguez; Toledo – María Victoria Medina |

=== Special awards ===
List of Miss Grand Spain 2022 Special Award Winners
| Award | Winner |
|---|---|
| Best Elegance | Madrid – Kristina Caci |
| Best in Swimsuit | Euskadi – Oihana Torres |
| Miss Congeniality | Navarre – Iratxe Francés |
| Miss Photogenic | Cantabria – María Pardo |

Miss Grand Spain 2022 competition result by province
Color keys

| Winner First runner-up Second runner-up | Third runner-up Fourth runner-up Top 10 | Top 15 Unplaced Did not participate |

== Candidates ==
34 delegates were selected by regional licensees to compete for the national title of Miss Grand Spain 2022.

| Province/Community/Region | Contestant | Age | Hometown | Ref. |
|---|---|---|---|---|
| Almería | Gigi Mendes | 28 | Huércal de Almería | |
| Andalusia | Elisabeth Ros | 22 | La Janda | |
| Atlántico | Sara Sánchez | 27 | | |
| Barcelona | Marta Bernal | 22 | Les Corts | |
| Cádiz | Alba Pérez | 19 | Puerto Real | |
| Cantabria | María Pardo | 17 | Piélagos | |
| Ciudad Real | Elisabeth Vergara | 19 | | |
| Costa Canaria | Maryana Abreu | 18 | | |
| Costa Cantábrica | Sil Vázquez | 21 | | |
| Costa de la Luz | María Moreno | 20 | San José del Valle | |
| Costa del Sol | Belén López | 27 | Málaga | |
| Costa Gallega | Lucía Lamas | 21 | Ourense | |
| Córdoba | Naiara Afan | 18 | Aguilar de la Frontera | |
| Euskadi | Oihana Torres | 17 | Bilbao | |
| Extremadura | Cristina Vaquerizo | 21 | | |
| Galicia | Aitana Paradela | 23 | Ourense | |
| Girona | Luna López | 20 | Figueres | |
| Granada | Natalia Quirós | 19 | La Zubia | |
| Jaén | María José Molina | 22 | Mancha Real | |
| Huelva | Verónica Molins | 23 | Ayamonte | |
| Islas Afortunadas | Ana Luisa Herrera | 26 | | |
| Las Palmas | Hirisley Jiménez | 20 | Tejeda | |
| La Rioja | Elena Prado Marin | 26 | Logroño | |
| Lleida | Mar Pallini | 22 | | |
| Madrid | Kristina Caci | 25 | | |
| Málaga | Lourdes Cabrera | 19 | | |
| Murcia | Miriam Avilés | 20 | | |
| Navarre | Iratxe Francés | 23 | | |
| Sevilla | Maria Domínguez | 20 | Coria del Río | |
| Tarragona | Lorena Sospedra | 26 | | |
| Tenerife | Fabiola Sánchez | 19 | | |
| Toledo | María Victoria Medina | 27 | | |
| Valencia | Erika Pereira | 22 | | |
| Zaragoza | Anakristina Rivero | 22 | | |
