= Miss Grand Málaga =

Provincial pageant in Spain

- Formation: 2016; 10 years ago
- Type: Beauty pageant
- Headquarters: Málaga
- Location: Spain
- Members: Miss Grand Spain
- Official language: Spanish

Miss Grand Málaga is a Spanish provincial female beauty pageant, held annually since 2016, to select representatives from the Province of Málaga for the Miss Grand Spain national competition.

Since the first competition in the Miss Grand Spain pageant, Málaga's representatives won the main title once; in 2016 by Adriana Sánchez.

== History ==
After Vicente Gonzalez acquired the license of Miss Grand Spain in 2015, he began franchising the provincial competitions to individual organizers, who would name the provincial representatives to compete in the national pageant the following year. In the province of Málaga, the first provincial contest of Miss Grand was organized in 2016, and a model Adriana Sánchez was named the first Miss Grand Málaga. Since then, the pageant has been held annually, with delegates from different municipalities in Málaga participating.

== Editions ==
The following table details Miss Grand Málaga's annual editions since 2016.

Edition	Date	Final venue	Entrants	Winner	Ref.
1st	2016	No data available		Adriana Sánchez	
2nd	14 May 2017	Sala París 15, Cruz de Humilladero	30	Anastasia Castillo	
3rd (Note: Representatives of Costa del Sol were also named in the event.)	20 May 2018	Sala París 15, Cruz de Humilladero	39	María Sánchez Alés	
4th	3 May 2019	Hotel Ilunion Hacienda, Mijas	16	Nabila Recio	
5th	27 August 2020	Recinto Musical Eduardo Ocón, Centro	28	Alexandra Cucu	
6th	20 November 2021	Edgar Neville Auditorium, Carretera de Cádiz	22	Lourdes Cabrera	
7th	16 December 2022	Edgar Neville Auditorium, Carretera de Cádiz	15	Patricia Romero Reina	
8th	9 February 2024	Edgar Neville Auditorium, Carretera de Cádiz	12	Virginia Pelagia Nnang	
9th	28 April 2025	Valencia, Aldaia	9	Valeria García	
10th	31 January 2026	Teatro de Las Lagunas, Mijas Costa	9	Gema Sánchez	

== National competition ==
The following is a list of Málaga representatives who competed at the Miss Grand Spain national pageant.

Year	Representative	Original provincial title	Placement at Miss Grand Spain	Ref.
2016	Adriana Sánchez	Miss Grand Málaga 2016	Winner	
2017	Anastasia Castillo	Miss Grand Málaga 2017	Unplaced	
2018	Maria Sánchez Alés	Miss Grand Málaga 2018	Unplaced	
2019	Nabila Recio	Miss Grand Málaga 2019	Unplaced	
No national pageant in 2020 due to the COVID-19 pandemic
2021	Alexandra Cucu	Miss Grand Málaga 2020	Unplaced	
2022	Lourdes Cabrera	Miss Grand Málaga 2021	Unplaced	
2023	Patricia Romero Reina	Miss Grand Málaga 2022	Top 15	
2024	Virginia Pelagia Nnang	Miss Grand Málaga 2023	Unplaced	
2025	Valeria García	Appointed	Unplaced	
