= Carretera =

Carretera (Spanish "highway") may refer to:

- La Carretera, album by Julio Iglesias 1995
- "La Carretera" (song), 2016 song by American singer Prince Royce

== See also ==
- Carretera Central (disambiguation)
- Carretera Austral, Chile
- Carretera de Cádiz, one of the 11 districts of the city of Málaga, Spain
