= Pozoblanco =

- Municipality
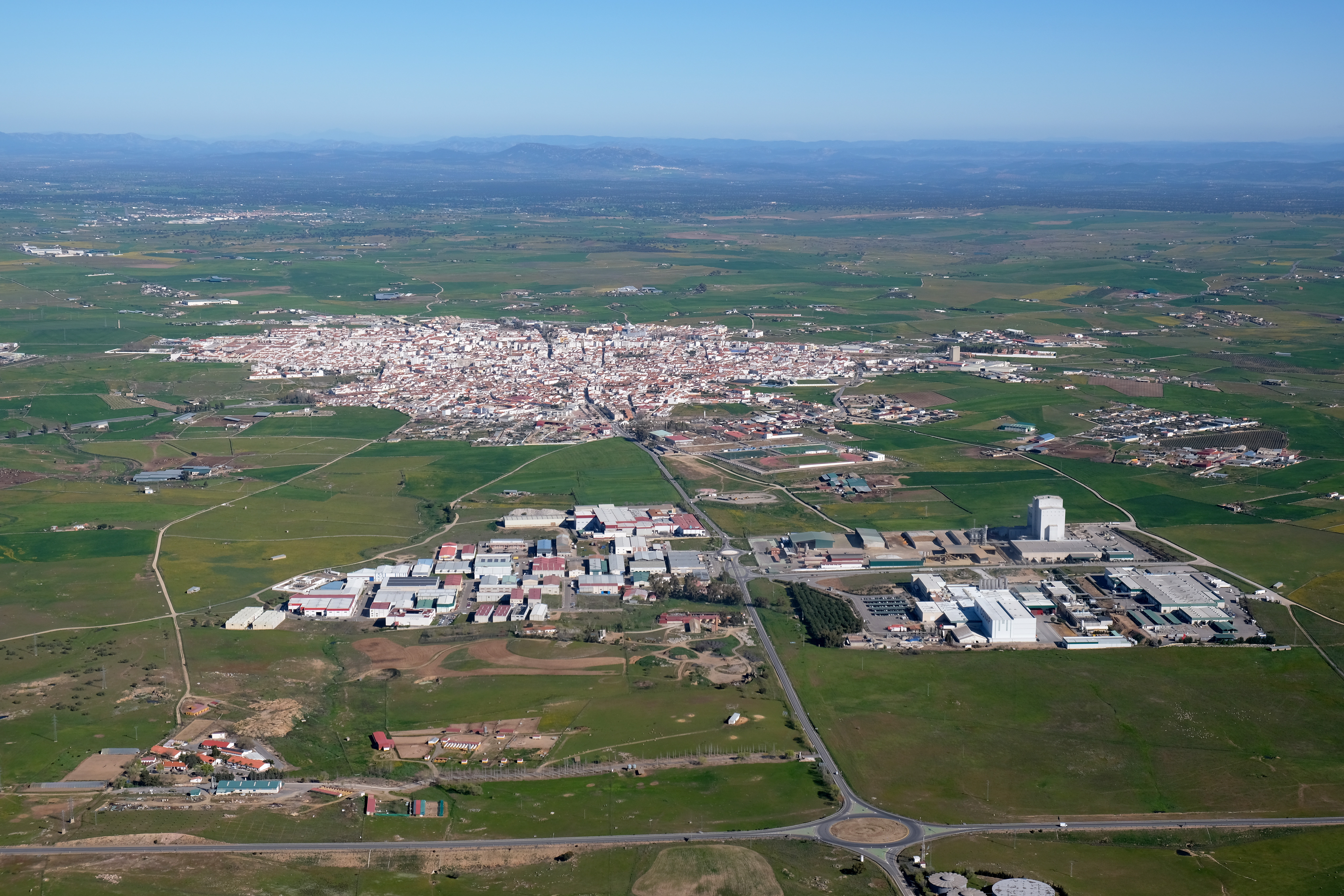
- Aerial view of Pozoblanco.

- Coat of arms

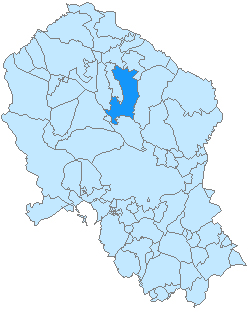
- Location of Pozoblanco in the province of Córdoba.

- Location in Spain Location in Andalusia Location in the Province of Córdoba
- Coordinates: 38°23′N 4°51′W
- Country: Spain
- Autonomous community: Andalusia
- Province: Córdoba
- Comarca: Los Pedroches
- Judicial district: Pozoblanco

Government
  - Alcalde: Santiago Cabello Muñoz

Area
  - Total: 329.92 km^{2} (127.38 sq mi)
- Elevation: 654 m (2,146 ft)

Population (2025-01-01)
  - Total: 16,931
  - Density: 51.319/km^{2} (132.91/sq mi)
- Demonym: Tarugos or Pozoalbenses
- Time zone: UTC+1 (CET)
  - Summer (DST): UTC+2 (CEST)
- Postal code: 14400
- Official language(s): Spanish
- Website: Official website

Pozoblanco (Spanish pronunciation: [poθoˈβlaŋko]) is a town in the province of Córdoba, southern Spain, in the north-central part of the autonomous community of Andalusia. It is located near the headwaters of the Guadamatillas and other small sub-tributaries of the Guadiana, in the lowlands of Los Pedroches, which lie between the Sierra de la Alcildia on the north and the Sierra Morena on the south.

It is the birthplace of the novelist Rafael Peñas Cruz and the composer Lorenzo Palomo.

== History ==
Pozoblanco, like other nearby towns such as Villanueva de Córdoba, probably originated in the mid 14th century when residents of Pedroche fled from the bubonic plague. Alternatively, Pozoblanco may have begun as a small outpost that developed over time as residents of Pedroche were forced to pasture their livestock further and further from the town. Another possibility is that Pozoblanco was founded by a Jewish community, perhaps after being expelled from Pedroche.

The first settlements were in the area known today as “Pozo Viejo.” According to tradition, the town grew up around a well that had turned white from the excrement of chickens, hence the name Pozoblanco, meaning “white well.” The well and chicken can also be seen on the town coat of arms.

Pozoblanco depended administratively on Pedroche until it obtained the title of Villa around 1478. In the medieval era, the history of Pozoblanco is tied to that of the so-called “Seven Villas of the Pedroches” (Pedroche, Torremilano, Torrecampo, Pozoblanco, Villanueva de Córdoba, Alcaracejos and Añora). This community was broken up in 1836 and the communal lands were redistributed among the towns. Pozoblanco received the title of city from King Alfonso XIII on April 22, 1923.

Pozoblanco remained loyal to the Republic throughout the Spanish Civil War. The battle of Pozoblanco took place in March 1937, when the forces of General Queipo de Llano attempted to conquer the town. However, the troops of the Spanish Republican Army under the command of Lieutenant Colonel Joaquín Pérez Salas defeated the Nationalist forces and held the town. In late March 1939, Pozoblanco was conquered by the armies of the Francoist faction.

== See also ==
- List of municipalities in Córdoba

== Twin towns ==
- Le Mée-sur-Seine, France
- Meckenheim, Germany
