= Añora =

- Municipality
- Seal

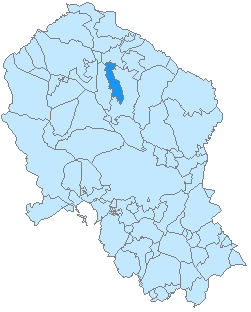

- Location in Spain Añora (Province of Córdoba (Spain))
- Coordinates: 38°24′44.48″N 4°53′51.48″W
- Country: Spain
- Province: Córdoba
- Municipality: Añora

Area
  - Total: 111 km^{2} (43 sq mi)
- Elevation: 624 m (2,047 ft)

Population (2025-01-01)
  - Total: 1,487
  - Density: 13.4/km^{2} (34.7/sq mi)
- Time zone: UTC+1 (CET)
  - Summer (DST): UTC+2 (CEST)

Añora is a city located in the province of Córdoba, Spain. According to the 2014 census, the municipality has a population of 1,555 inhabitants. Its postal code is 14450.

== History ==
Añora was founded as a village dependent on Torremilano at the end of the 14th century. It obtained its title as a separate town in 1553 and since then has been part of the Seven Towns of the Valley of Los Pedroches, along with Pedroche, Torremilano, Torrecampo, Pozoblanco, Alcaracejos, and Villanueva de Córdoba. From 1660 to 1747 these towns formed the Marquessate of Carpio. Its municipal boundaries were not demarcated until the early 20th century.

Marcos Rodríguez Pantoja, the child who lived by himself in the middle of the Sierra Morena in the area that is now the Sierra de Cardeña y Montoro Natural Park, was born in Añora. The film “Entre lobos” by the Cordovan director Gerardo Olivares was based on this experience.

== See also ==
- List of municipalities in Córdoba
