= Los Pedroches =

Coordinates: 38°25′N 04°45′W

- Comarca
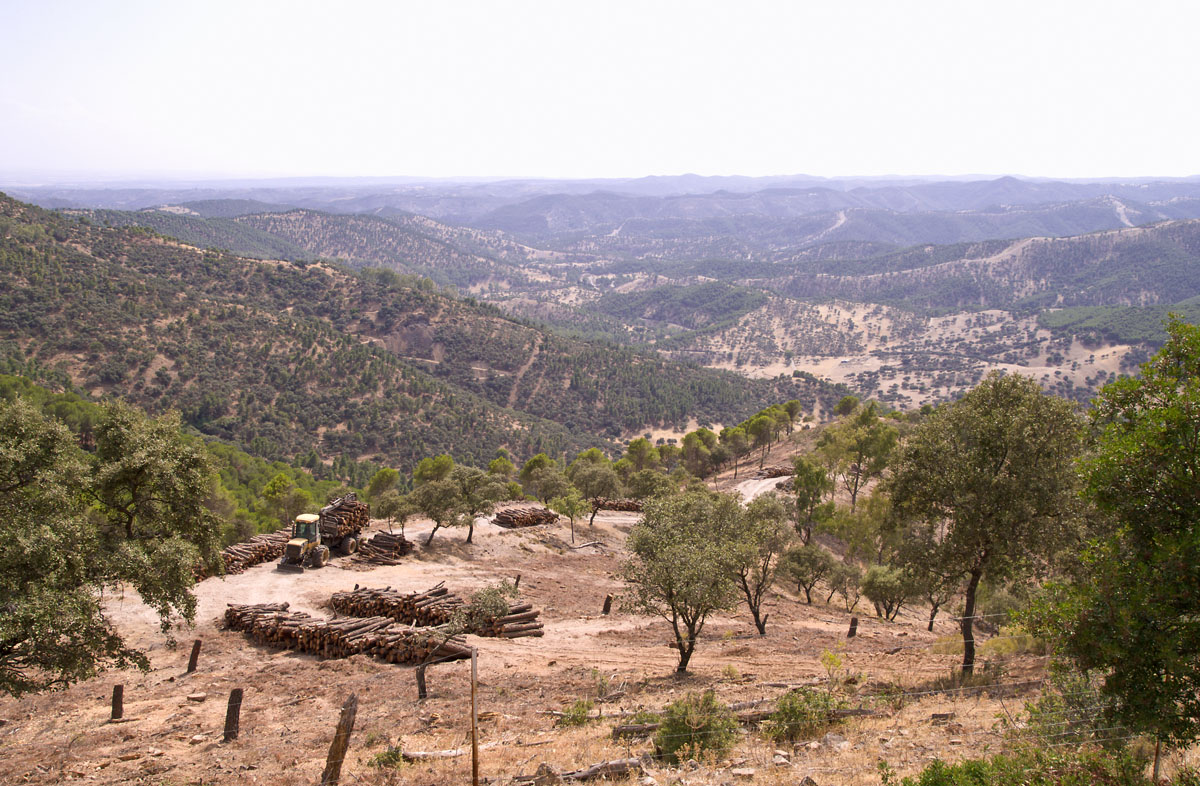
- Landscape of Los Pedroches at Los Muros, near Cardeña.

- Location of Los Pedroches in the province of Córdoba
- Country: Spain
- Region: Andalusia
- Province: Córdoba

Area
  - Total: 3,500 ha (8,600 acres)

Dimensions
  - Length: 115 km (71 mi)
  - Width: 60 km (37 mi)
- Elevation: 650 m (2,130 ft)

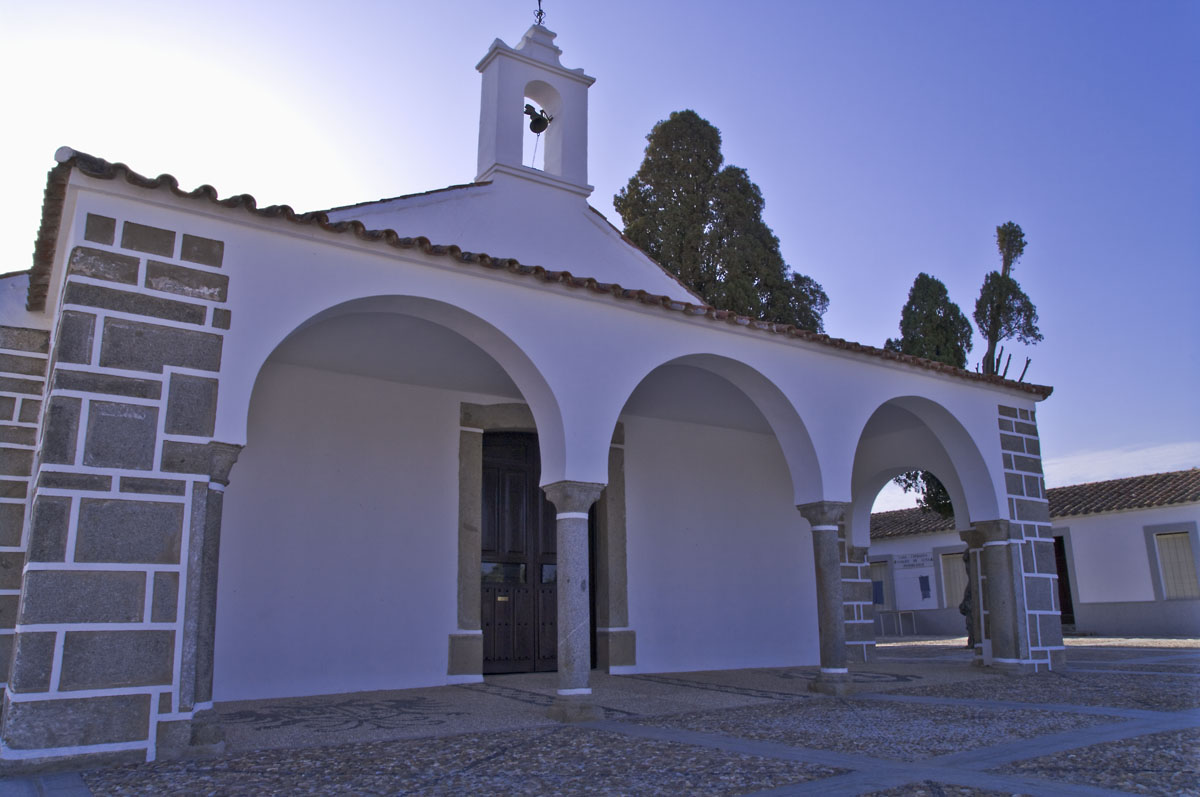
Virgen de La Luna de Los Pedroches shrine

Los Pedroches is a natural region and comarca in Córdoba Province, Andalusia, southern Spain. It is located in the Sierra Morena area at the northern end of the province. The main town is Pozoblanco.

The climate of the comarca is continental. It is the northernmost Andalusian territory..

The kūra of Fahs al‐Ballūt coincides with Los Pedroches.

== Municipalities ==
- Alcaracejos
- Añora
- Belalcázar
- Cardeña
  - Venta del Charco
  - Azuel
- Conquista
- Dos Torres
- El Guijo
- El Viso
- Fuente la Lancha
- Hinojosa del Duque
- Pedroche
- Pozoblanco
- Santa Eufemia
- Torrecampo
- Villanueva del Duque
- Villaralto
- Villanueva de Córdoba

== Specialty: ham ==
Aḥmad al-Rāzī (Córdoba, 888 - Córdoba, 955) calls the Pedroches "Fahs al Ballut", which means "plain of acorns". He says: "The oak is the only tree species in this area. That’s why it is called "The plain of acorns", and they are the best in Spain." The "Los Pedroches" is one of the four Spanish designations of origin (Denominación de origen) for ham; it is produced and processed in an area that covers 32 towns and villages in the Los Pedroches valley. But the production of ham in Spain was developed only from the 19th century when the local breeds were crossed with other breeds to increase the size of the pigs' upper legs. Before that, the local pigs were known for the quality of their meat as a whole.

== Observing the stars ==
The Pedroches is an international dark-sky preserve, with numerous spots suitable for observing the stars: they are the peri-urban parks, shrines or old mines that are scattered throughout the region. The Starlight Reserve includes 17 towns: Cardeña, Conquista, Villanueva de Córdoba, El Guijo, Santa Eufemia, El Viso, Villaralto, Alcaracejos, Torrecampo, Añora, Pozoblanco, Pedroche, Dos Torres, Hinojosa del Duque, Fuente la Lancha, Villanueva del Duque and Belalcázar.

== See also ==
- Comarcas of Andalusia
- Pedroche
