= Bartolomé Madrid Olmo =

Spanish politician (born 1964)

Bartolomé Madrid Olmo MP

Member of the Congress of Deputies
- Incumbent
- Assumed office 2023
- Constituency: Córdoba

Personal details
- Born: 14 June 1964 (age 61) Añora, Spain
- Party: People's Party (Spain)

Bartolomé Madrid Olmo (born 14 June 1964) is a Spanish politician from the People's Party. He was elected mayor of Añora since 1995. In the 2023 Spanish general election he was elected to the Congress of Deputies for Córdoba.

== See also ==
- 15th Congress of Deputies
