= Miss Grand Granada =

Provincial pageant in Spain

- Formation: 19 May 2017; 9 years ago
- Founder: Eva Burgos
- Type: Beauty pageant
- Headquarters: Granada
- Location: Spain
- Members: Miss Grand Spain
- Official language: Spanish

Miss Grand Granada is a Spanish provincial female beauty pageant, held annually since 2017, to select representatives from the Province of Granada for the Miss Grand Spain national competition.

Since the first competition in the Miss Grand Spain pageant, Granada's representatives have not won the main title yet. The highest placement they obtained was the second runner-up in 2021, won by Luisa Victoria Malz.

== History ==
After Vicente Gonzalez acquired the license of Miss Grand Spain in 2015, he began franchising the provincial competitions to individual organizers, who would name the provincial representatives to compete in the national pageant the following year. In the province of Granada, the competition license was granted to a modeling agency, Eva Burgos Escuela de Modelos, which organized the first Miss Grand Granada on 19 May 2017, at the Nevada Shopping Mall in the city of Granada. The competition consisted of 18 finalists from different municipalities, of whom a student from the University of Granada, Paola Morales, was named the first Miss Grand Granada elected through the provincial contest. Previously, Granada once participated in the Miss Grand Spain pageant in 2016 with the representation of an appointed candidate, Elena Maya.

Some municipalities, such as Ogíjares, also held community contests to elect local representatives for Miss Grand Granada.

== Editions ==
The following table details Miss Grand Granada's annual editions since 2017.

Edition	Date	Final venue	Entrants	Winner	Ref.
1st	19 May 2017	Nevada Shopping Mall, Granada	18	Paola Morales	
2nd	31 March 2018	Jardines La Clave, Granada	38	Angy Muñoz	
3rd	24 March 2019	Hotel Andalucía Center, Granada	25	María Jesús Delgado	
4th (Note: Representative of Andalucia was also named in the same event.)	20 September 2020	Parque de San Sebastián, Ogíjares	43	Luisa Victoria Malz	
5th	3 October 2021	Parque de San Sebastián, Ogíjares	51	Natalia Quirós	
6th	2 October 2022	Parque de San Sebastián, Ogíjares	44	Marta Guarnido	
7th	15 October 2023	Edgar Neville auditorium of the Diputación de Málaga	44	Ángela Ortega	
8th	6 October 2024	San Sebastian Park, Ogíjares	28	Cristina Melguizo	
9th	9 October 2025	San Sebastian Park, Ogíjares	23	Rocío Campos	

== National competition ==
The following is a list of Granada representatives who competed at the Miss Grand Spain national pageant.

Color keys

- : Declared as the winner
- : Ended as a runner-up
- : Ended as a finalist
- : Ended as a semifinalist
- : Ended as special awards winner

=== As Granada representatives ===
Year	Miss Grand Granada	Title	Placement	Special Awards
2026	Rocío Campos	Miss Grand Granada 2025	TBA	
2025	Cristina Melguizo	Miss Grand Granada 2024	Unplaced	
2024	Ángela Ortega	Miss Grand Granada 2023	Unplaced	
2022	Natalia Quirós	Miss Grand Granada 2021	4th runner-up	
2021	Luisa Victoria Malz	Miss Grand Granada 2020	2nd runner-up	
No national pageant in 2020 due to the COVID-19 pandemic
2019	María Jesús Delgado Rosales	Miss Grand Granada 2019	Top 14	
2018	Angy Muñoz González	Miss Grand Granada 2018	Unplaced	
2017	Paola Morales	Miss Grand Granada 2017	Top 5	
2016	Elena Maya	Miss Grand Granada 2016	Top 10	
