= Miss Grand Almería =

Provincial pageant in Spain

- Formation: 16 June 2018; 8 years ago
- Type: Beauty pageant
- Headquarters: Almería
- Location: Spain
- Members: Miss Grand Spain
- Official language: Spanish

Miss Grand Almería is a Spanish provincial female beauty pageant, founded in 2018 that aims to select representatives from the province of Almería for the Miss Grand Spain national competition.

Since the first competition in the Miss Grand Spain pageant, Almería's representatives have not won the main title yet. The highest placement they obtained was the third runner-up in 2023, won by a Romania-born model, Denisse Vivienne Andor, who later dominated herself as the Romanian representative for the Miss Grand International 2023 pageant in Vietnam.

== History ==
Since Vicente Gonzalez began franchising the provincial competitions to individual organizers in 2016, the province of Almería sent its representatives to compete five times, with three annual editions of the Miss Grand Almería pageant being held. The inaugural edition of the contest happened in 2018, and 24-year-old Lucía Peregrín was named the first Miss Grand Almería elected through the provincial pageant. Previously, Almería joined the Miss Grand Spain 2016 contest with the representation of the appointed candidate, Laura Funes.

== Editions ==
The following table details Miss Grand Almería's annual editions since 2018.

Edition	Date	Final venue	Entrants	Winner	Ref.
1st	16 June 2018	No data available		Lucía Peregrín	
2nd	27 March 2022	Terraza Urbana – HO. Puerta de Purchena, Almería	12	Gigi Mendes	
3rd	24 February 2023	Teatro Municipal de Macael, Macael	15	Denisse Vivienne	

== National competition ==
The following is a list of Almería representatives who competed at the Miss Grand Spain national pageant.

Color keys

- : Declared as the winner
- : Ended as a runner-up
- : Ended as a finalist
- : Ended as a semifinalist
- : Ended as special awards winner

Year	Miss Grand Almería	Title	Placement
Did not compete between 2024-2025
2023	Denisse Vivienne Andor	Miss Grand Almería 2023	3rd runner-up
2022	Gigi Mendes	Miss Grand Almería 2022	Top 15
2021	Janire de la Iglesia	Appointed	Unplaced
Did not compete in 2019 and no national pageant in 2020 due to the COVID-19 pandemic
2018	Lucía Peregrin Lopéz	Miss Grand Almería 2018	Unplaced
2017	Laura Funes	Appointed	Unplaced
