= Convento de Nuestra Señora de la Concepción (Pedroche) =

Building in Andalusia, Spain

Coordinates: 38.4280°N 4.7652°W

Convento de Nuestra Señora de la Concepción (Convent of Our Lady of Conception) is a ruined convent and heritage building in Pedroche, Córdoba Province, Andalusia, Spain. It was founded in 1524 by the nuns of Santa Clara de la Columna de Belalcazar. The building is located in the historic center, near the parish church and the Hermitage of Santa María del Castillo. It is designed in the mudéjar style. The bell-gable was added in the 18th century. A new altarpiece was added in 1942, after the restoration of the damage arising as a result of the Spanish Civil War.

== Architecture and fittings ==
The building was enlarged to meet the growing needs of the religious community. The original construction is mostly ruined and abandoned, although the refectory, kitchens, stairs, cloister of the cistern, yards, gardens and cemetery are identified.

The main entrance of the convent is opens directly onto the street Francisco Botello. It is made with blocks of granite and consists of a geminate inverted arch, with thread cutting molding and keystones; it is aligned with and supports arch panels on flat pilasters. A gallery features six arches on granite piers with tapered capitals. This gallery is open through two portals, also of granite, the first settled by a simple arch and the second through another arch. In front of this porch is the entrance to the temple.

The church and convent are joined by a large room divided longitudinally by a semicircular arch double banked on a column of granite. A lower level is reached by three steps. The staircase is two sections at right angles with a central plateau and paneled roof deck; the steps are of granite in one piece.

The refectory is rectangular and is punctuated by three elliptical arches of granite. It connects directly to the kitchen area, pantry, herb garden and cloister of the cistern.

The Cloister of the Cistern is a large irregular space landscaped with fruit trees; pomegranate and lemon are mentioned. There are trees and aromatic shrubs, including thickets and laurel and ornamental plants such as roses. It is bounded to the southwest by the cemetery, two small pens and a two-story gallery with arches, where the former cells were located. In this cloister there is a well curb dated 1956 Neo-Baroque style.

To the west, there is a large space before the old garden, currently segmented in two by a low wall that separates the modern building of the cloister, built in the 20th century by housing of the old convent.

The church, located transversely with respect to the outside, has a presbytery and a dome decorated with paintings alluding to Christ's Passion and Compassion Mary. At the foot is the choir. The ceiling is reinforced by a column of wrought iron. The choir loft connects directly with the body of the former living cells. The connection to the street is done via the front opening in the wall of the Epistle, containing granite block lintels.
