= Miss Grand Extremadura =

Regional pageant in Spain

- Formation: 22 April 2018; 8 years ago
- Type: Beauty pageant
- Headquarters: Almendralejo
- Location: Spain
- Members: Miss Grand Spain
- Official language: Spanish

Miss Grand Extremadura is a Spanish regional female beauty pageant, founded in 2018 to select representatives from the community of Extremadura for the Miss Grand Spain national competition.

Since first participating in the Miss Grand Spain pageant, Extremadura's representatives have not won the main title yet. The highest placement they obtained was the fourth runner-up, won by Jeannette Garcia in 2021.

== History ==
Extremadura debuted in the Miss Grand Spain pageant in 2016 under the appointed Miss Grand Cáceres and Miss Grand Badajoz. The first competition of Miss Grand Extremadura, consisting of contestants from 31 municipalities, later happened in 2018 at the Teatro Carolina Coronado, Almendralejo, where Sara Cisneros was named the winner. The pageant has been held annually since then. Due to the lack of separate pageants, the titleholders of Miss Grand Cáceres and Miss Grand Badajoz were also determined through the Miss Grand Extremadura pageant in some years.

== Editions ==
The following table details Miss Grand Extremadura's annual editions since 2017.

Edition	Date	Final venue	Entrants	Winner	Ref.
1st (Note: Miss Grand Badajoz 2018, who also qualified for the national contest, was also determined in the event.)	22 April 2018	Teatro Carolina Coronado, Almendralejo	31	Sara Cisneros	
2nd	24 March 2019	Teatro Carolina Coronado, Almendralejo	21	Paula Miralles	
3rd	26 July 2020	Teatro Carolina Coronado, Almendralejo	20	Jeannette Garcia	
4th	23 January 2022	Teatro Carolina Coronado, Almendralejo	12	Cristina Vaquerizo	
5th	18 September 2022	Teatro Carolina Coronado, Almendralejo	16	Jara Bonito Ortega	

== National competition ==
The following is a list of Extremadura representatives who competed at the Miss Grand Spain national pageant.

Year	As autonomy representative	As provincial representatives	
Year	Miss Grand Extremadura	Miss Grand Cáceres	Miss Grand Badajoz
2016	×	Osiris Maria Piñero (Unplaced)	Elena Navarro (Unplaced)
2017	Angela González (Top 11)	×	×
2018	Sara Cisneros (Top 10)	×	Naiara Gomez (Top 15)
2019	Paula Miralles (Unplaced)	Irene Simón (Unplaced)	×
2021	Jeannette Garcia (4th runner-up)	×	×
2022	Cristina Vaquerizo (Unplaced)	×	×
2023	Jara Bonito Ortega (Unplaced)	×	×
2024	Isabel Álvarez (Unplaced)	×	×
