= Miss Grand Navarra =

Provincial pageant in Spain

- Formation: 18 October 2020; 6 years ago
- Type: Beauty pageant
- Headquarters: Pamplona
- Location: Spain
- Members: Miss Grand Spain
- Official language: Spanish

Miss Grand Navarra is a Spanish provincial female beauty pageant founded in 2020, aiming to select representatives from the community of Navarra for the Miss Grand Spain national competition.

Since first participating in the Miss Grand Spain pageant, Navarra's representatives have not won the main title yet. The highest placement they obtained was the top 13 finalists, won by Dori Rodríguez in 2021.

== History ==
From 2018 to 2019, after the president of the Miss Grand Spain pageant, Vicente Gonzalez, began franchising the provincial competitions to individual organizers in 2016, the community of Navarra joined the competition with the representation of the appointed candidates. Later in 2020, the license for Miss Grand Navarra was granted to a local organizer who later held the first contest of the Miss Grand Navarra pageant consisting of candidates from 13 municipalities on 18 October 2020, in which a 21-year-old transgender representing Orcoyen, Dori Rodríguez, was named the winner, making her the first transgender to win a female beauty pageant in Navarra.

The organizer also held another edition of the pageant in the following years. However, the contract between them and the national organ was discontinued in 2024 resulting in no Navarra representative in the Miss Grand Spain 2024 pageant.

== Editions ==
The following table details Miss Grand Navarra's annual editions since 2020.

Edition	Date	Final venue	Entrants	Winner	Ref.
1st	18 October 2020	NH Iruña Park Hotel, Pamplona	13	Dori Rodríguez	
2nd	27 March 2022	NH Iruña Park Hotel, Pamplona	13	Iratxe Francés	

== National competition ==
The following is a list of Navarra representatives who competed at the Miss Grand Spain national pageant.

Year	Representative	Original provincial title	Placement at Miss Grand Spain	Ref.
2018	Flavia Medina	Appointed	Unplaced	
2019	Dana Vázquez	Miss Grand Euskadi 2019 finalist	Unplaced	
No national contest in 2020 due to the COVID-19 pandemic
2021	Dori Rodríguez Zubiri	Miss Grand Navarra 2020	Top 13	
2022	Iratxe Francés	Miss Grand Navarra 2021	Unplaced	
2023	Nerea Moreno	Appointed	Unplaced	
No representatives since 2024
