= Carretera Central =

A Carretera Central (English: Central Road) is a highway. It may refer to:

- Carretera Central (Cuba), a west–east highway spanning Cuba, begun in 1927
- Carretera Central (Peru), a west–east transandean highway from Lima, via La Oroya, to Pucallpa
- Carretera Central (Puerto Rico), a north–south highway crossing Puerto Rico, completed in 1898
