= Cardeña =

Municipality in Spain

Coordinates: 38°16′N 4°19′W

- Municipality
- Concello de Cardeña
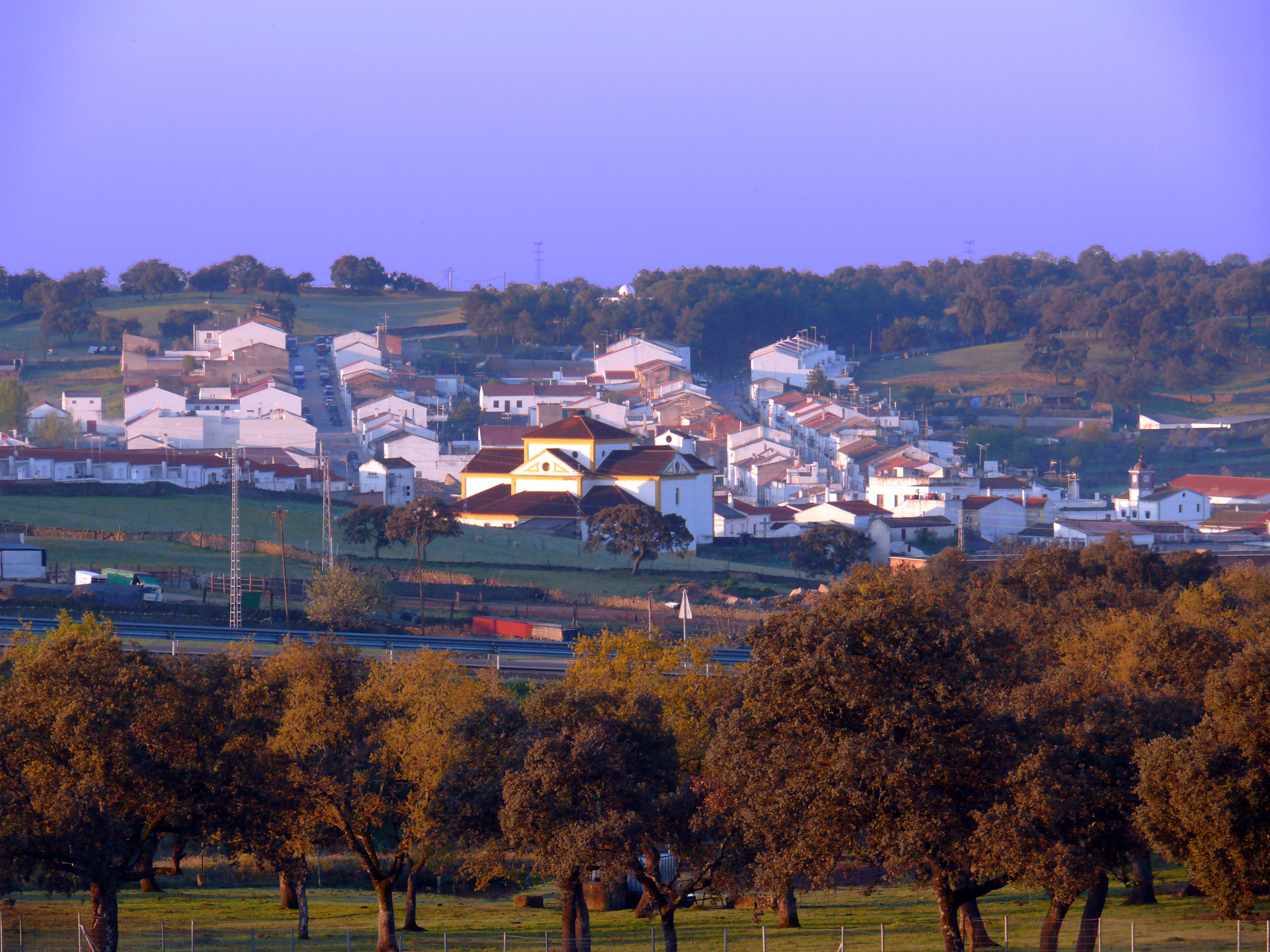
- Interactive map of Cardeña
- Country: Spain
- Autonomous community: Andalusia
- Province: Córdoba
- Comarca: Los Pedroches
- Demonym: Cardeñan
- Time zone: UTC+1 (CET)
  - Summer (DST): UTC+2 (CEST)

Cardeña is a municipality in the province of Córdoba, Spain.

== Climate ==
The climate of the municipality is continental.

== See also ==
- List of municipalities in Córdoba
