= Belalcázar, Spain =

Belalcázar
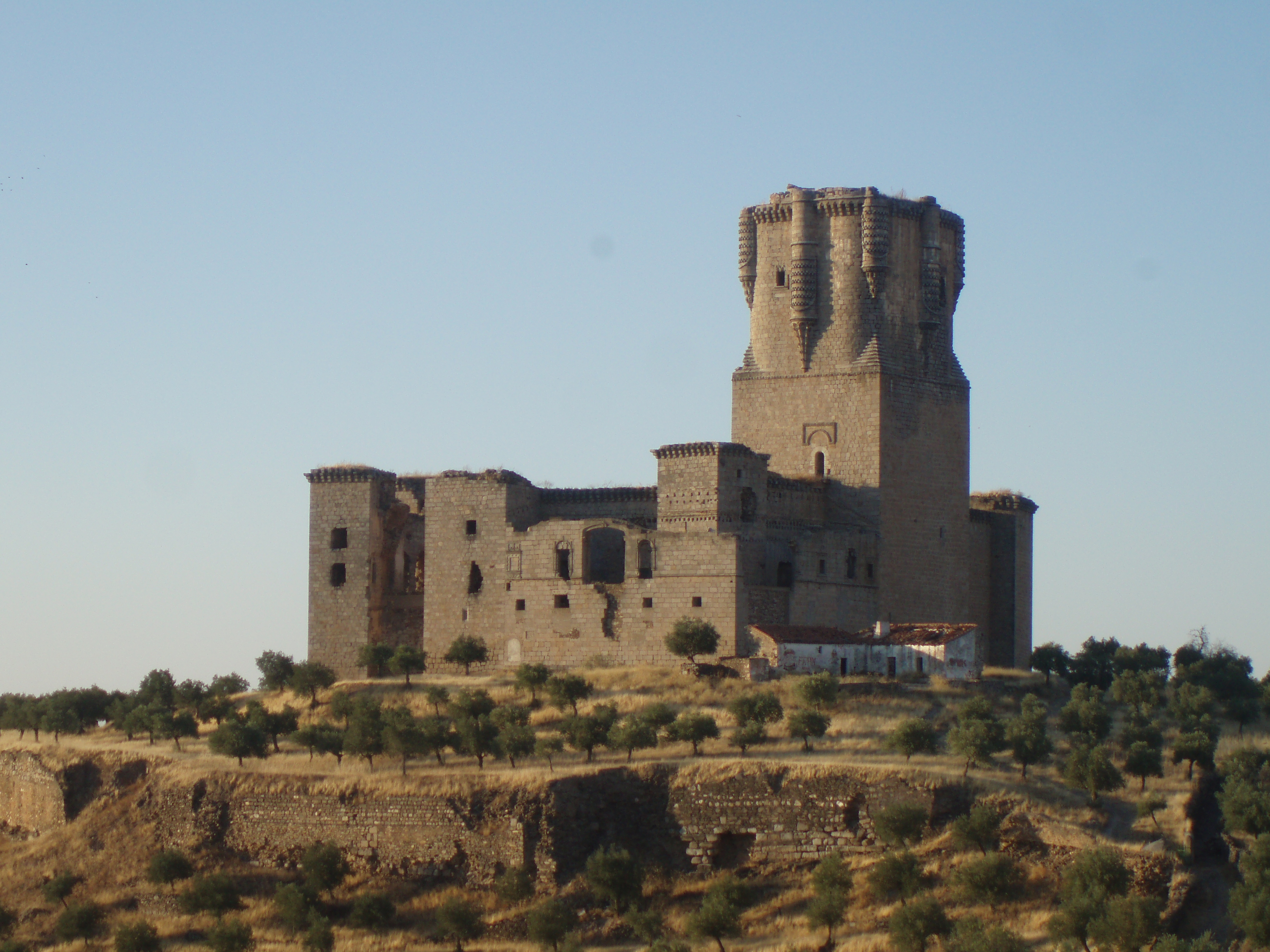
- Castle of the Sotomayor and Zuñiga.

- Flag Seal

- Location in Spain.
- Coordinates: 38°34′N 5°10′W
- Country: Spain
- Autonomous community: Andalusia
- Province: Córdoba
- Comarca: Los Pedroches

Government
  - Mayor: Antonio Vigara

Area
  - Total: 355.99 km^{2} (137.45 sq mi)
- Elevation: 488 m (1,601 ft)

Population (2025-01-01)
  - Total: 3,093
  - Density: 8.688/km^{2} (22.50/sq mi)
- Demonym: Belalcazareños
- Time zone: UTC+1 (CET)
  - Summer (DST): UTC+2 (CEST)
- Postal code: 14280
- Website: Official website

Belalcázar is a municipality and city in the province of Córdoba, Andalusia, southern Spain. Belalcázar s located approximately 100 km from Córdoba city.

Belalcázar is well-known by its cultural heritage: two castles, the convent of Santa Clara, the church of Santiago, the Roman bridge, or the city hall among others.

== History ==
Belalcázar hosted one of the Spanish Inquisition's tribunals, established in 1485 within Tomás de Torquemada's network, to investigate and prosecute conversos suspected of continuing to observe Jewish commandments.

== Main sights ==
- Castle of the Sotomayor Zúñiga y Madroñiz, in late Gothic style (15th century)
- Castle of Madroñiz
- Convent of Santa Clara de la Columna, founded in 1476
- Parish church of Santiago el Mayor, built from the late 16th century and finished in the 18th century.

== Gallery ==
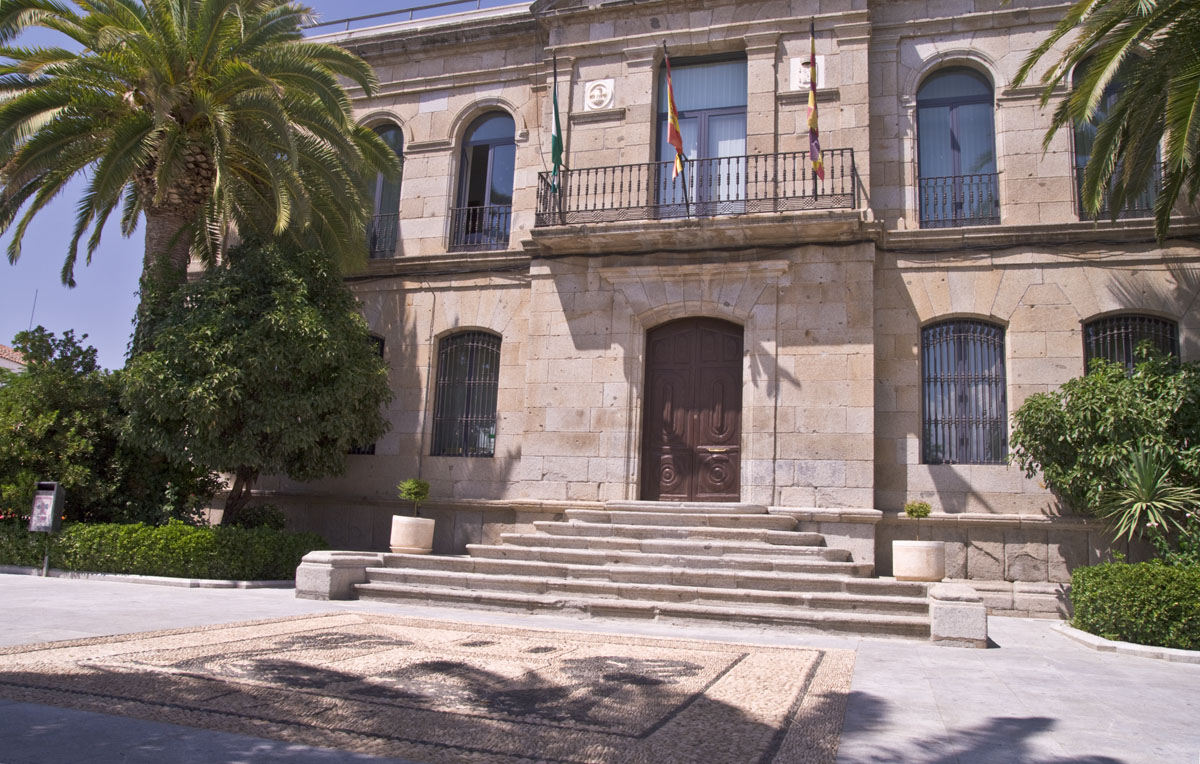
City hall

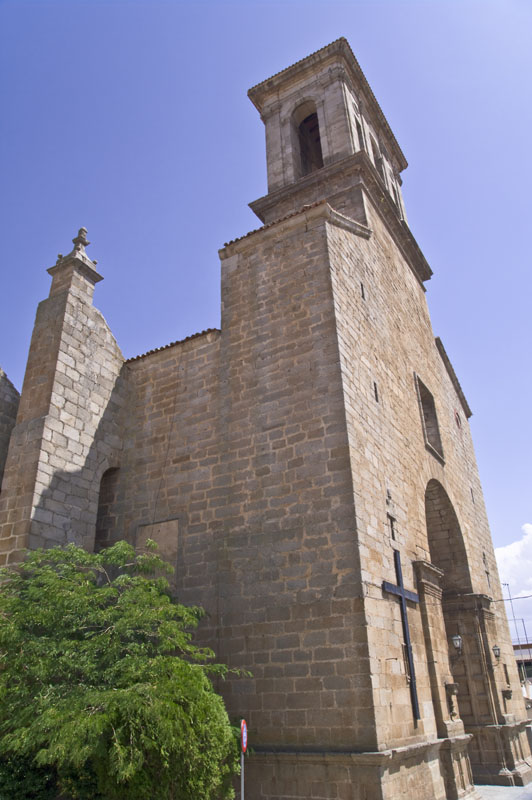
Santiago church

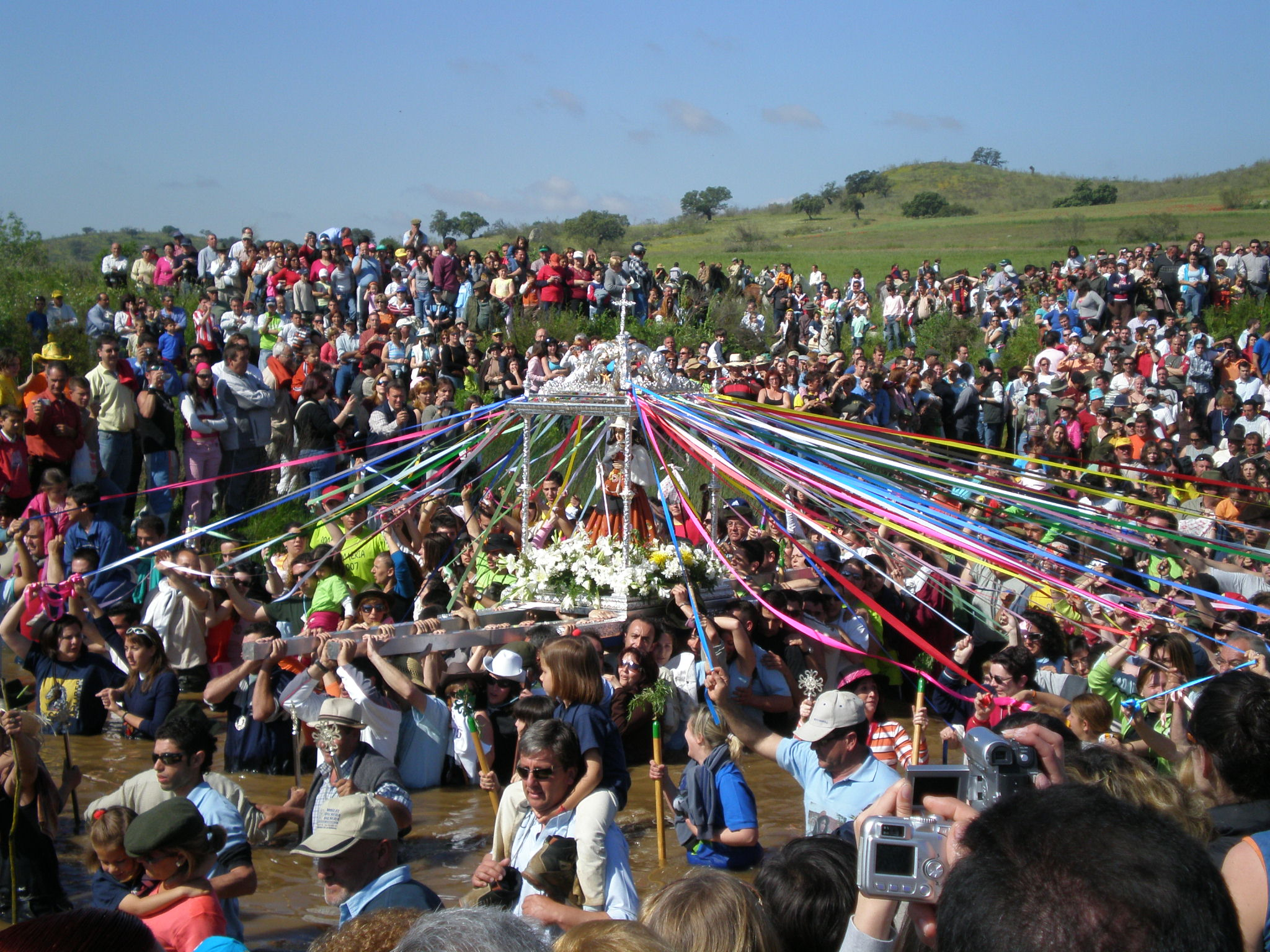
Virgen de la Alcantarilla celebration

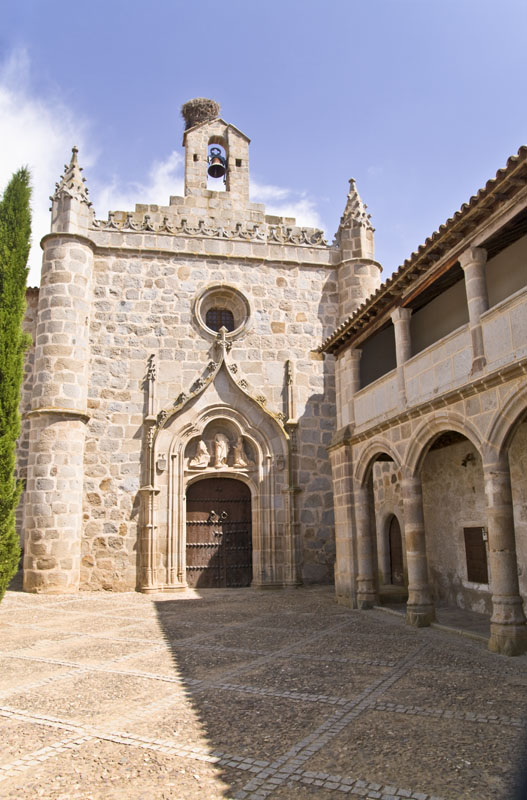
Canta Clara convent

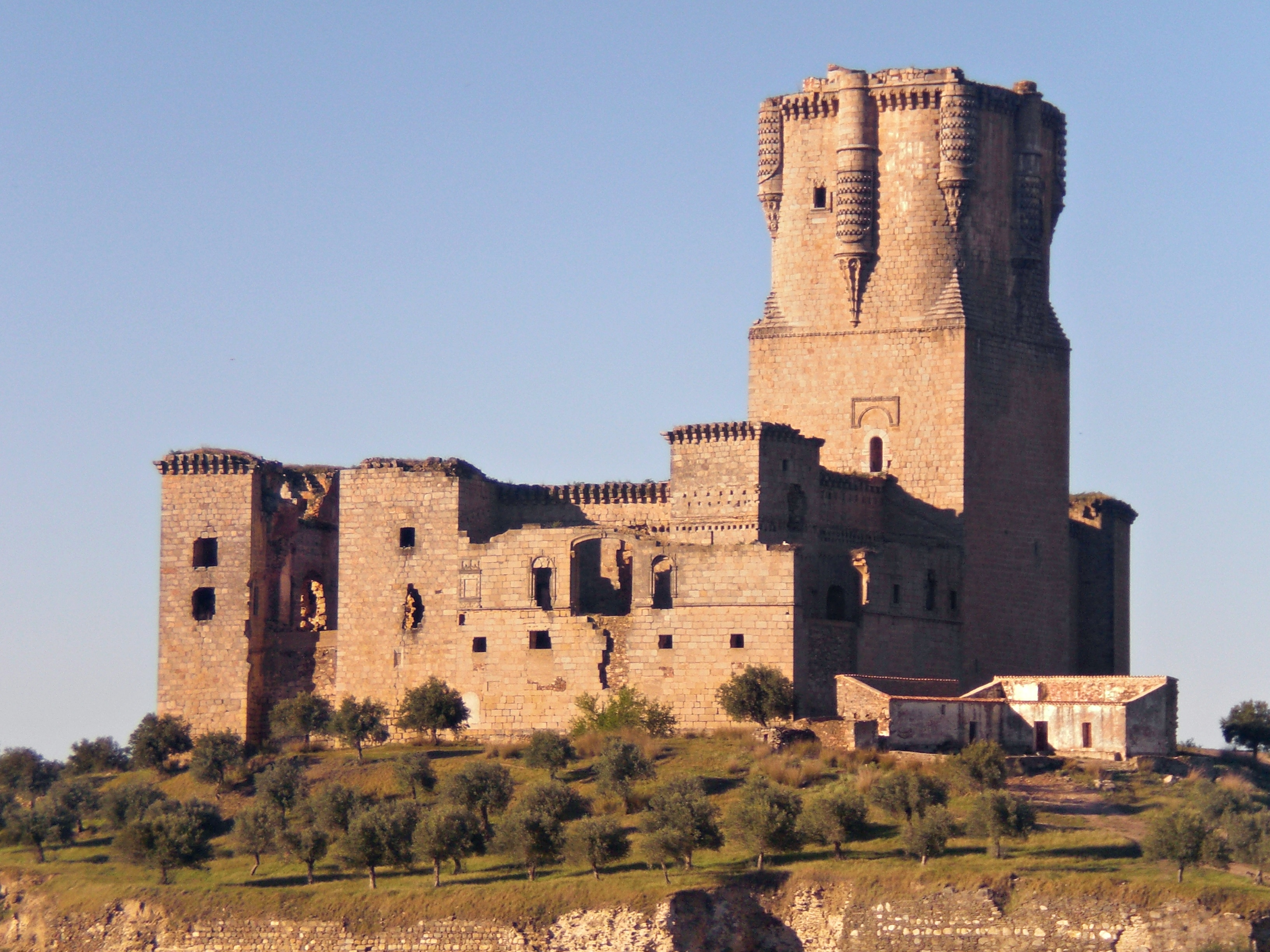
The castle

== Twin towns ==
- Belalcázar, Colombia

== See also ==
- List of municipalities in Córdoba
