= Santa Eufemia, Córdoba =

Santa Eufemia
- Municipality
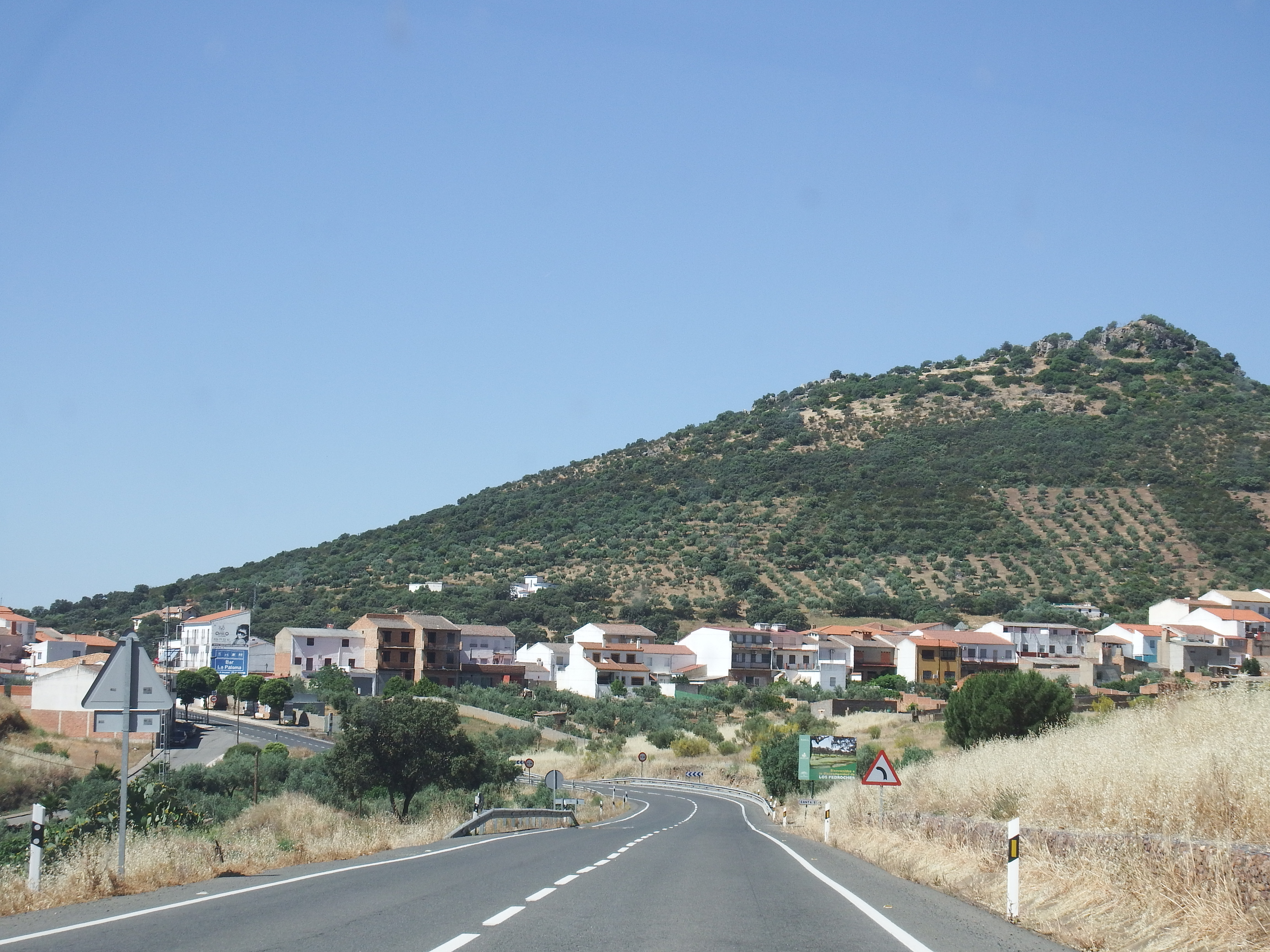

- Seal

- Location in Spain
- Coordinates: 38°35′45″N 4°54′15″W
- Country: Spain
- Autonomous community: Andalusia
- Province: Córdoba Province
- Comarca: Los Pedroches

Area
  - Total: 187.34 km^{2} (72.33 sq mi)
- Elevation: 561 m (1,841 ft)

Population (2025-01-01)
  - Total: 685
  - Density: 3.66/km^{2} (9.47/sq mi)
- Time zone: UTC+1 (CET)
  - Summer (DST): UTC+2 (CEST)
- Postal code: 14491
- Website: www.santaeufemia.es/

Santa Eufemia is a municipality in Córdoba Province, Spain. According to the 2014 census, the municipality has a population of 893 inhabitants.

The town is located in Los Pedroches, in the Sierra Morena.

== See also ==
- List of municipalities in Córdoba
