= Dos Torres =

Dos Torres, Spain
- city
- Flag Seal

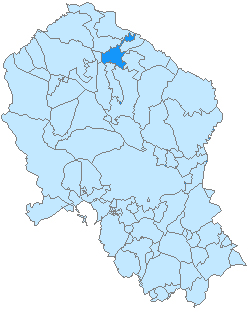
- Coordinates: 38°26′N 4°53′W
- Country: Spain
- Province: Córdoba
- Municipality: Dos Torres

Area
  - Total: 129 km^{2} (50 sq mi)
- Elevation: 587 m (1,926 ft)

Population (2025-01-01)
  - Total: 2,340
  - Density: 18.1/km^{2} (47.0/sq mi)
- Time zone: UTC+1 (CET)
  - Summer (DST): UTC+2 (CEST)

Dos Torres is a city located in the province of Córdoba, Spain. According to the 2006 census (INE), the city has a population of 2592 inhabitants.

== History ==
During the Middle Ages (and possibly before that), it used to be called Torremilano and was one of the seven villas of the Pedroches (Las Siete Villas de Los Pedroches). It was abandoned by its inhabitant fleeing the black plague around 1350 or shortly after.

== See also ==
- List of municipalities in Córdoba
