= Cruz de Humilladero =

- District of Málaga
- Country: Spain
- Aut. community: Andalusia
- Municipality: Málaga

Area
  - Total: 9.91 km^{2} (3.83 sq mi)

Population
  - Total: 93,955
  - Density: 9,480.83/km^{2} (24,555.2/sq mi)
- Málaga district number: 6
- Address of council: Calle Virgen de la Fuensanta 1, 29006

Cruz de Humilladero (Spanish for shrine's cross), also known as District 6, is one of the 11 districts of the city of Málaga, Spain.

It comprises the wards (barrios) of 4 de Diciembre, Arroyo del Cuarto, Camino de Antequera, Carranque, Cementerio San Rafael, Cortijo Alto, Cortijo de Torres, Cruz del Humilladero, El Duende, Estación de Los Prados, Hacienda Sáchez Blanca, Haza Cuevas, Industrial Alcalde Díaz Zafra, Industrial Siemens, Intelhorce, La Asunción, La Barriguilla, La Estación, La Unión, Las Chapas, Los Prados, Los Tilos, Mármoles, Nuestra Señora del Carmen, Núcleo General Franco, Polígono Carretera de Cártama, Polígono Industrial Alameda, Polígono Industrial Carretera de Cártama, Polígono Industrial El Viso, Polígono Industrial Huerta del Correo, Polígono Industrial La Estrella, Polígono Industrial Pérez Texeira, Polígono Industrial Ronda Exterior, Polígono Industrial San Luis, Portada Alta, Recinto Ferial Cortijo de Torres, San José del Viso, San Rafael, Sánchez Blanca, Santa Cristina, Santa Julia, Santa Marta, Teatinos, Tiro de Pichón.
