= Centro (Málaga) =

Coordinates: 36.72113°N 4.42155°W

- District of Málaga
- Country: Spain
- Aut. community: Andalusia
- Municipality: Málaga

Area
  - Total: 5.87 km^{2} (2.27 sq mi)

Population
  - Total: 84,988
  - Density: 14,478.36/km^{2} (37,498.8/sq mi)
- Postal code: 28032
- Málaga district number: 1
- Address of council: Calle La Merced 1, 29014

Centro (Spanish for Centre), also known as District 1 and Málaga-Centro, is one of the 11 districts of the city of Málaga, Spain.

It comprises de following wards (barrios): Barcenillas, Camino del Colmenar, Campos Elíseos, Cañada de los Ingleses, Capuchinos, Centro Histórico, Conde de Ureña, Cristo de la Epidemia, El Bulto, El Ejido, El Molinillo, Ensanche Centro, Explanada de la Estación, La Aurora, La Goleta, La Manía, La Merced, La Trinidad, La Victoria, Lagunillas, Los Antonios, Mármoles, Monte de Gibralfaro, Olletas, Parque Ayala, Perchel Norte, Perchel Sur, Pinares de Olletas, Plaza de Toros Vieja, Polígono Alameda, R.E.N.F.E., San Miguel, Santa Amalia, Segalerva, Seminario, Sierra Blanquilla y Ventaja Alta.

== Gallery ==
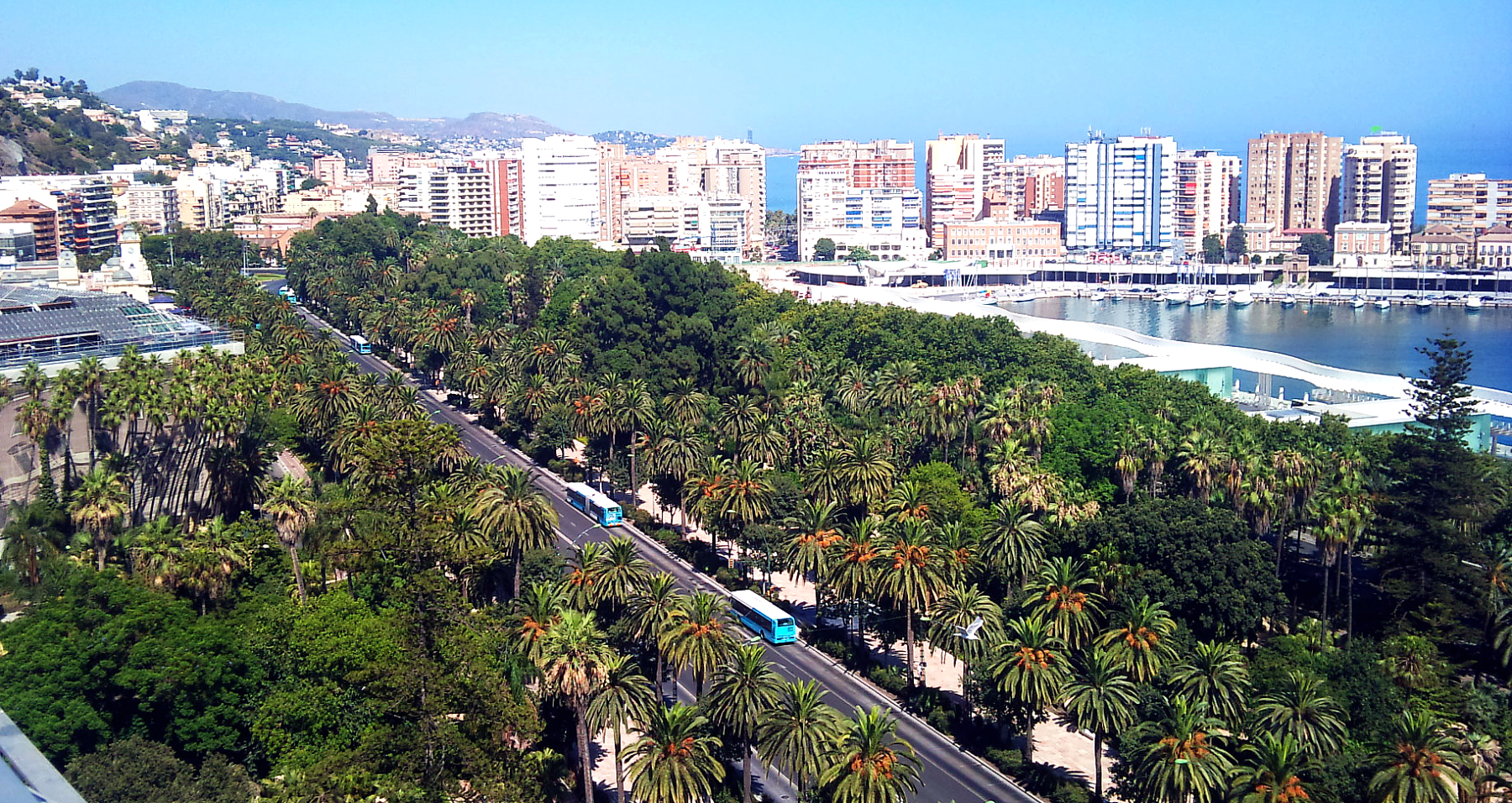
El Parque

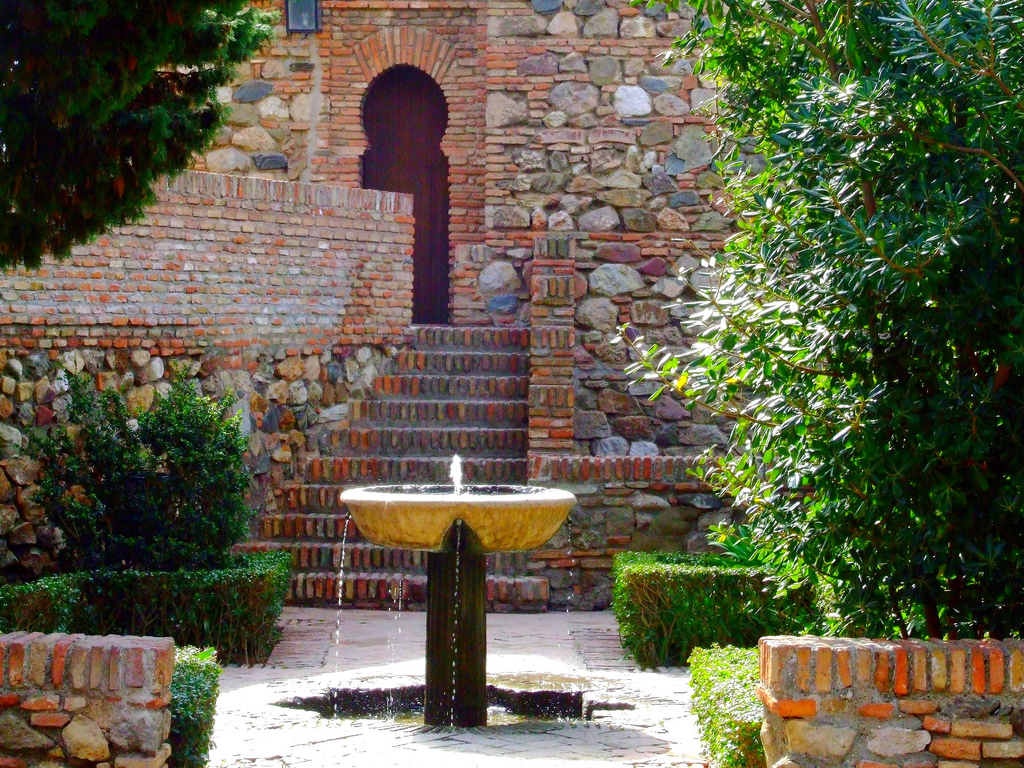
Alcazaba of Málaga

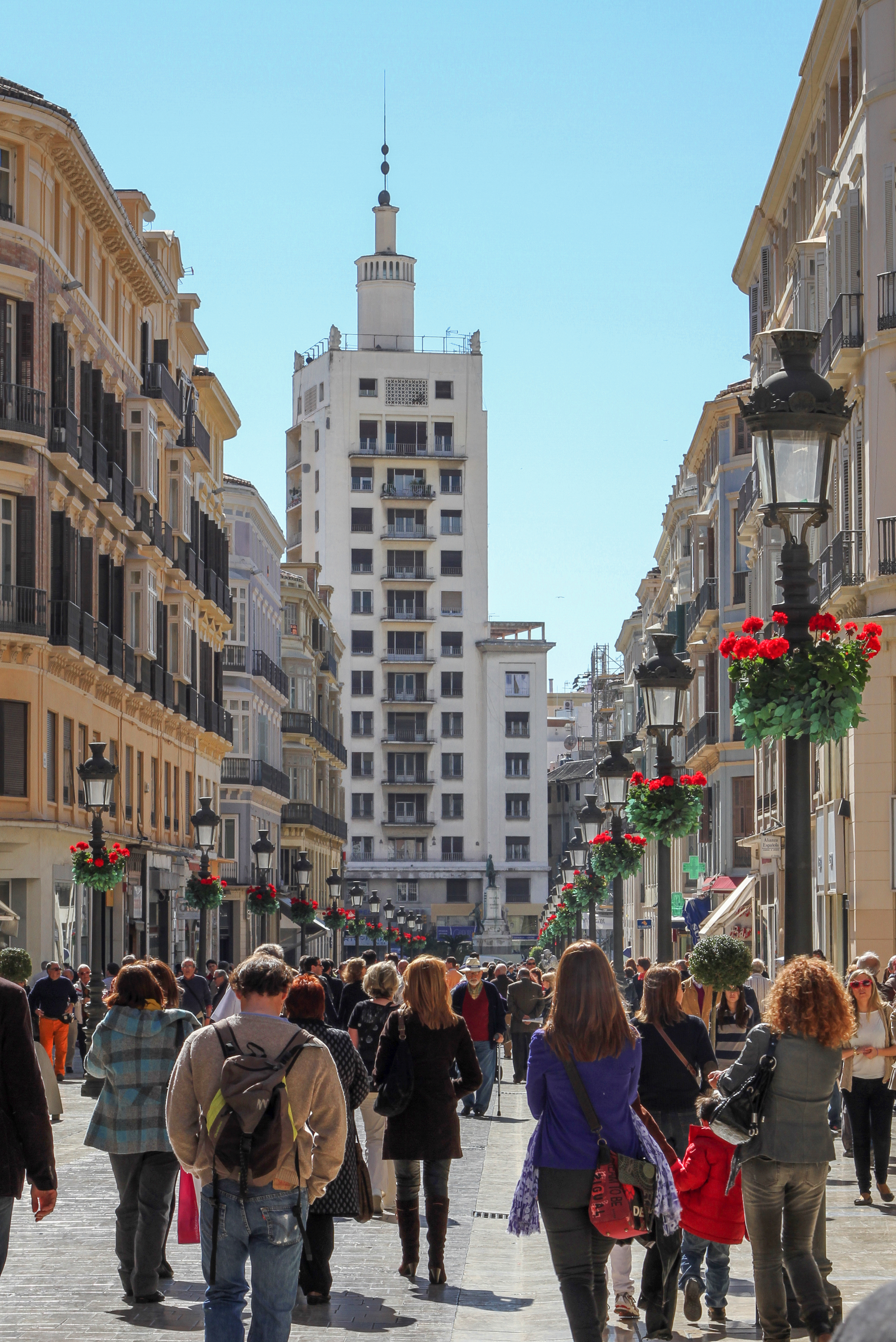
Larios Street

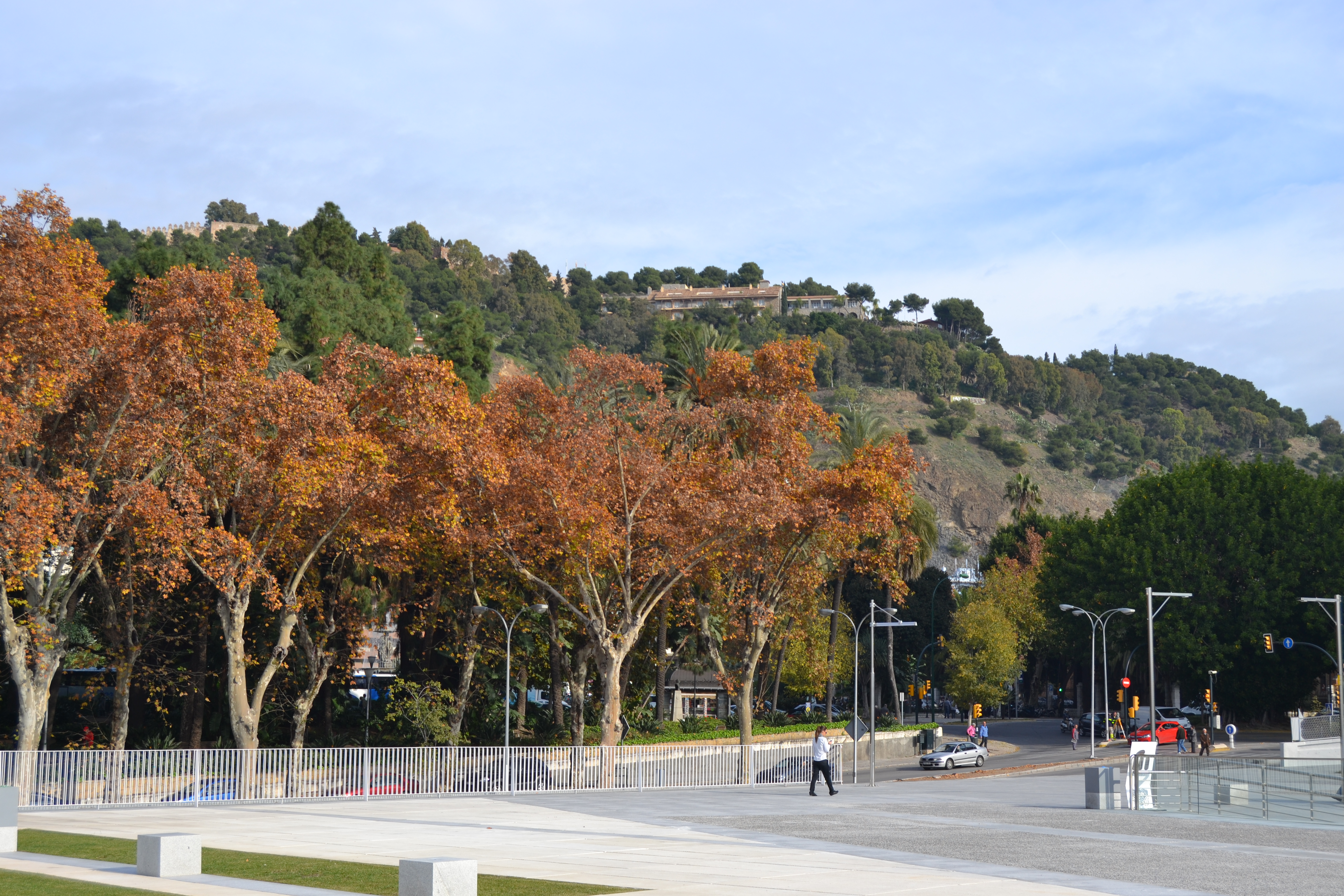
Paseo de los Curas

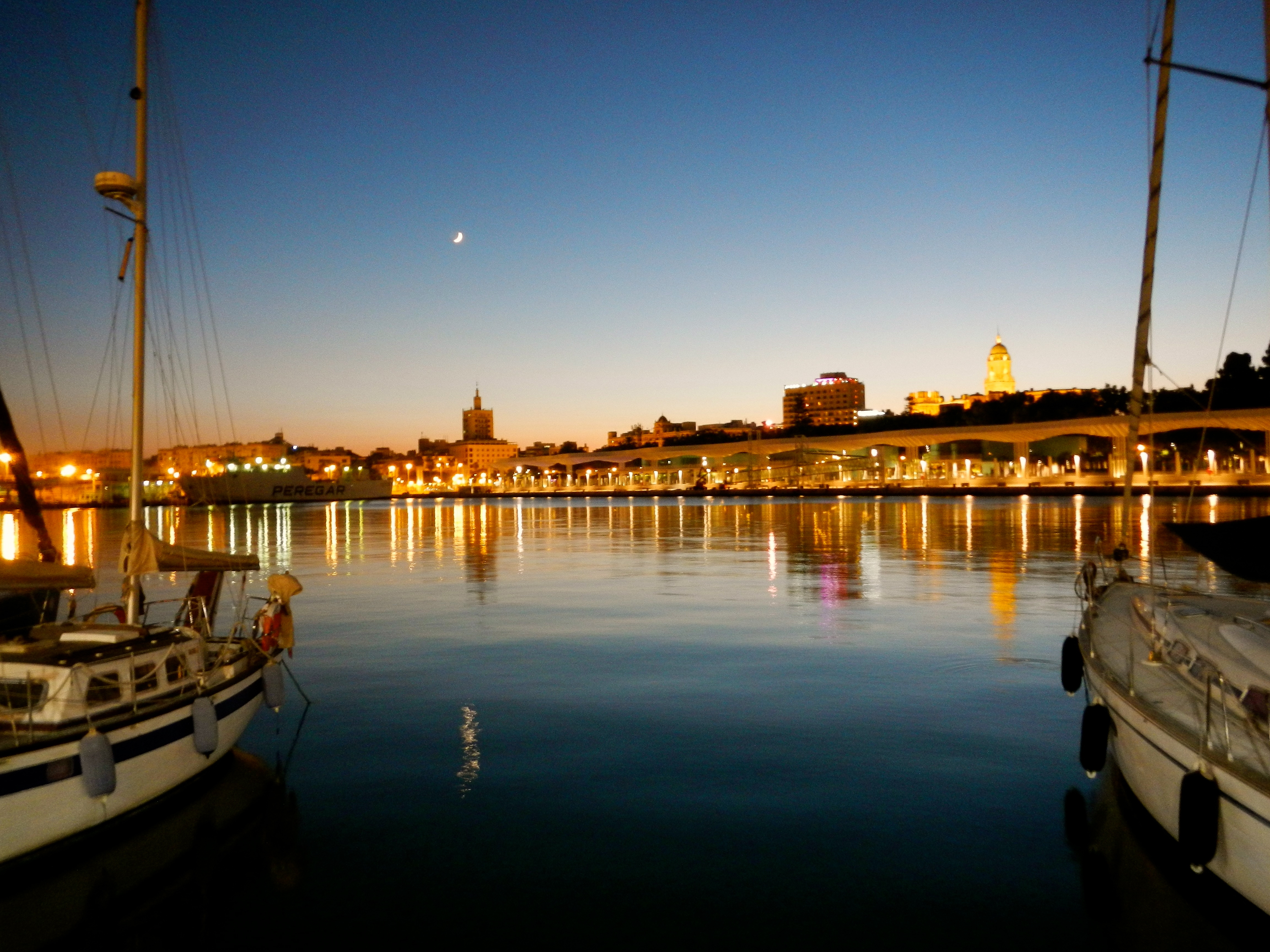
Port of Málaga

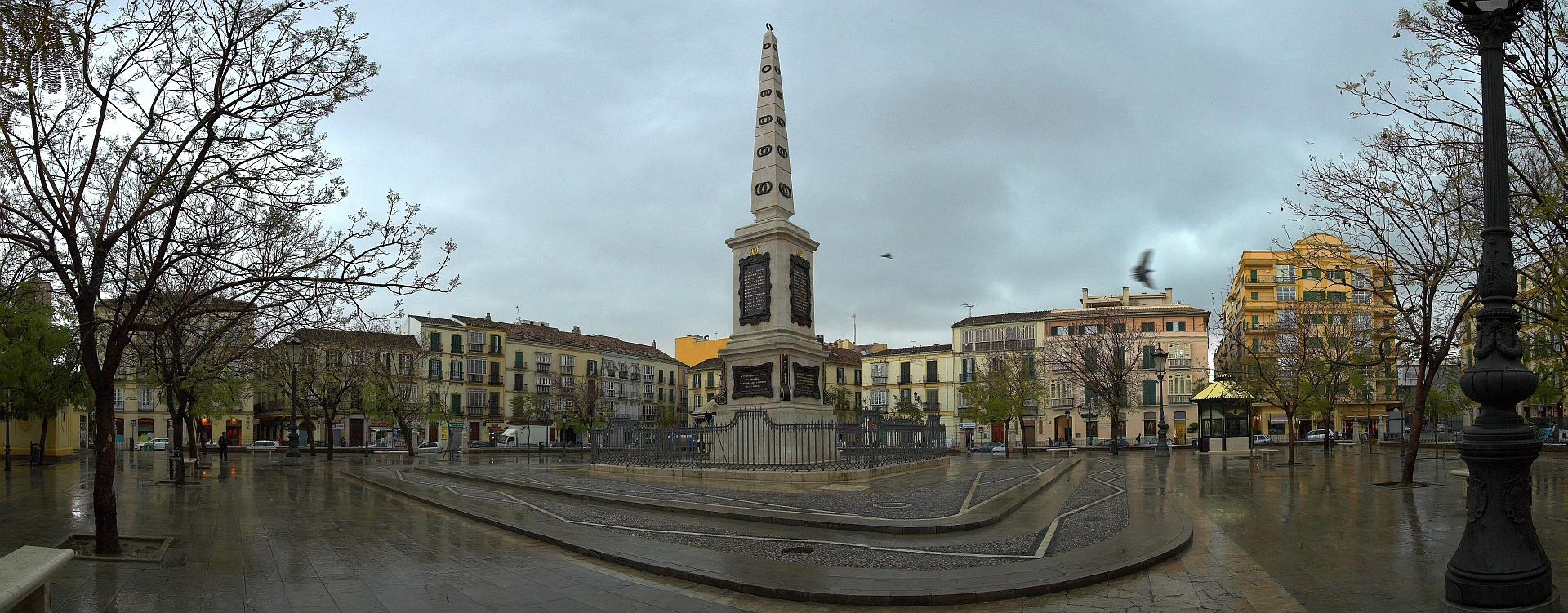
Plaza de la Merced

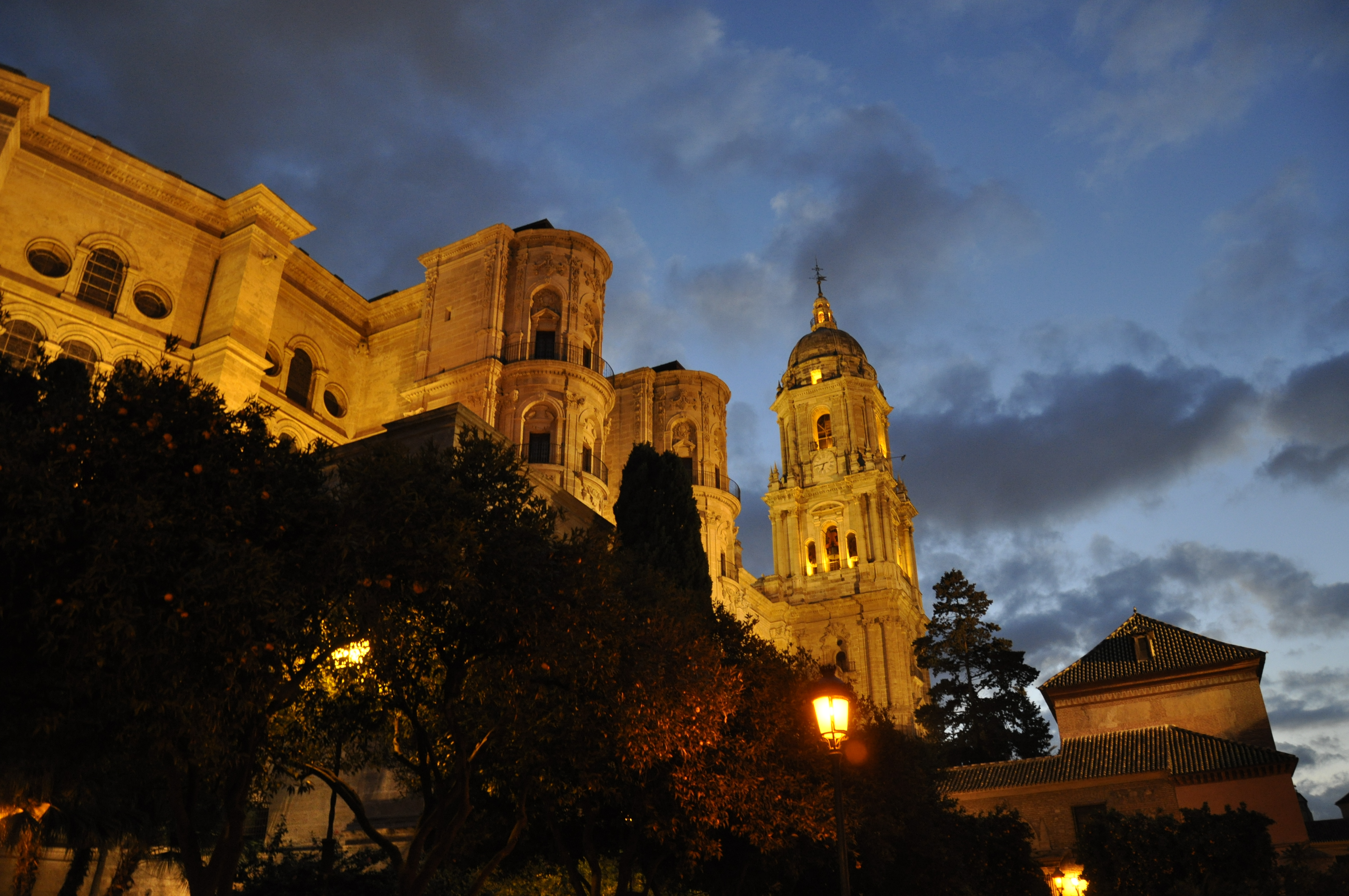
Cathedral of Málaga

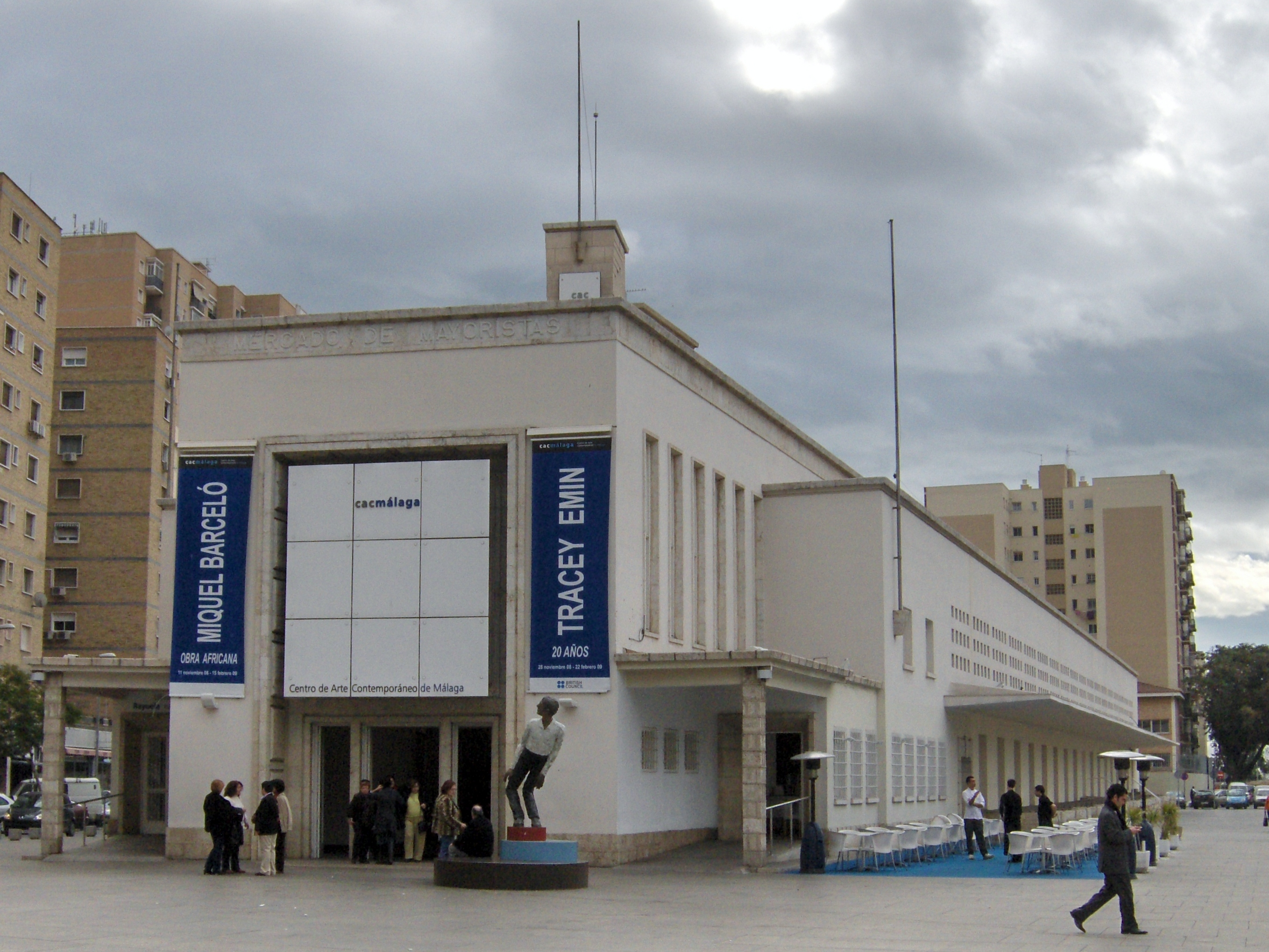
CAC Málaga

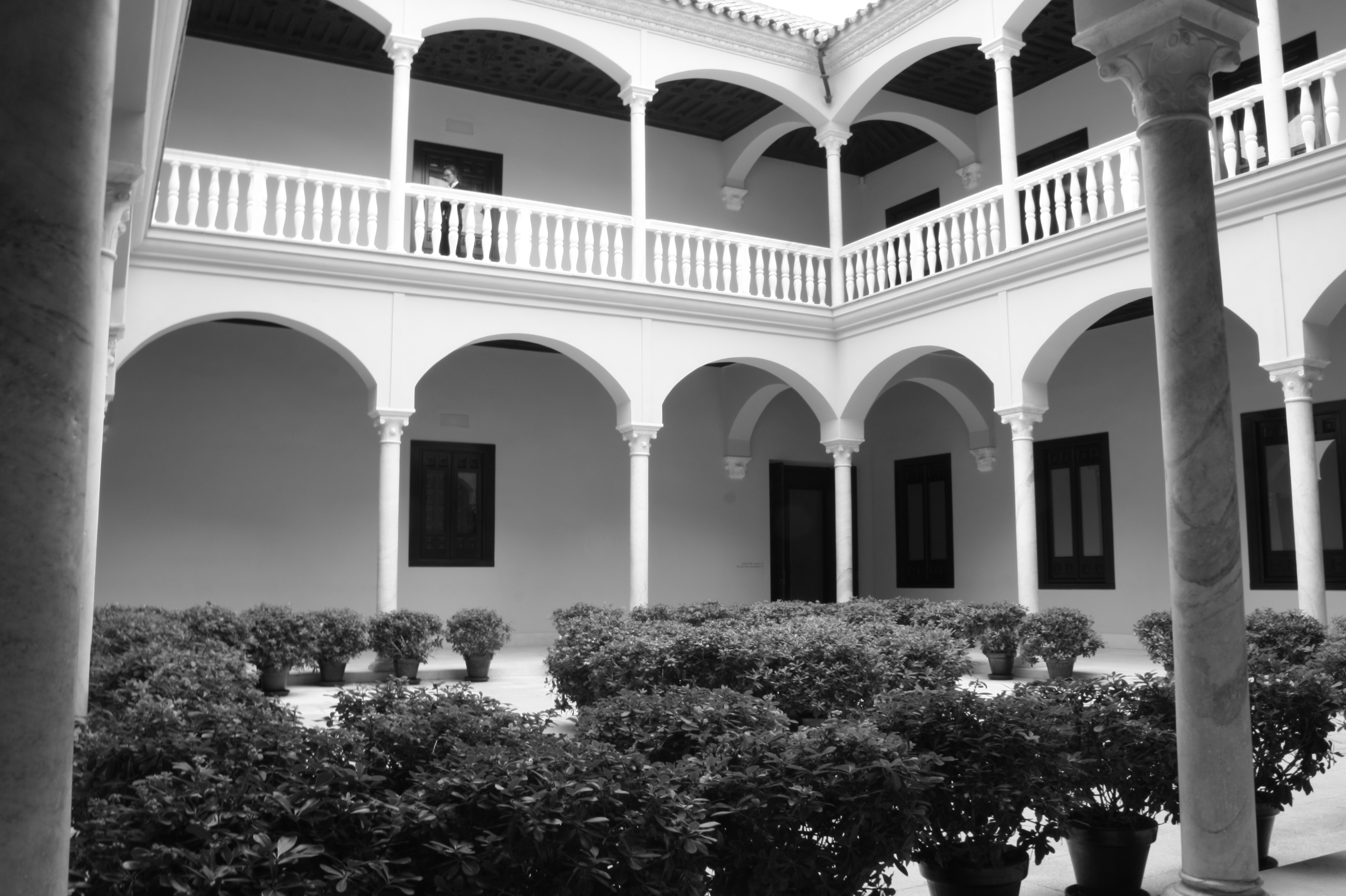
Museo Picasso Málaga

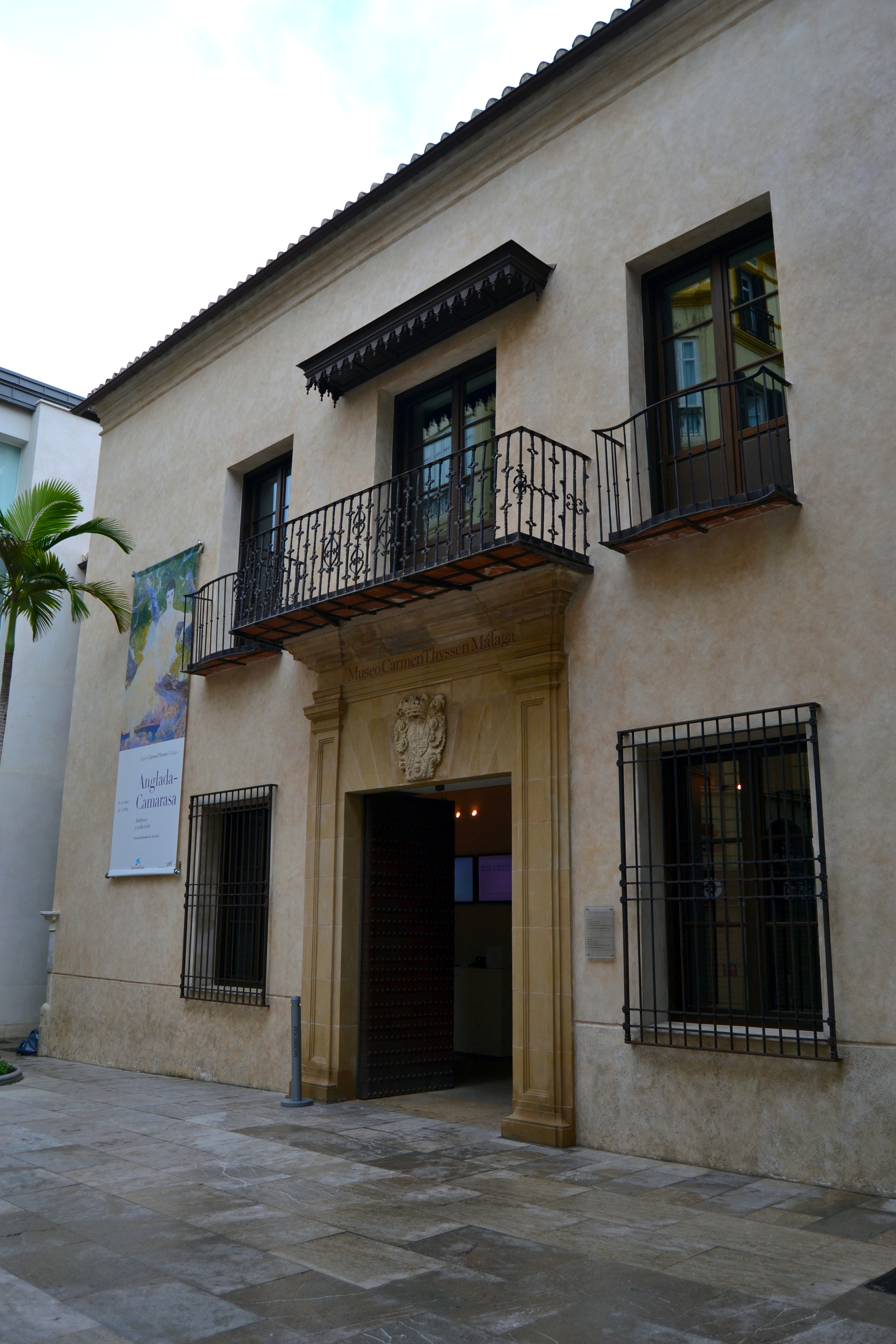
Carmen Thyssen Museum
