= Ogíjares =

- city
- View of Ogíjares

- Flag Coat of arms

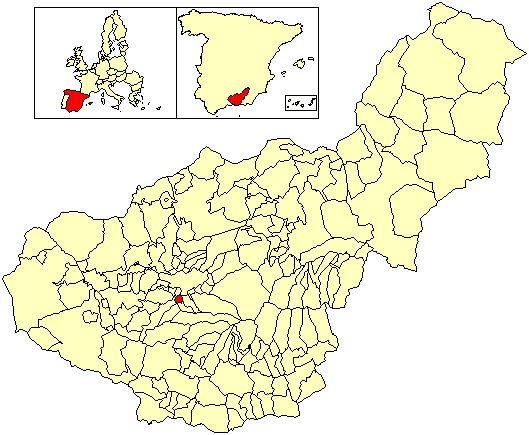
- Location of Ogíjares
- Coordinates: 37°07′N 3°36′W
- Country: Spain
- Province: Granada
- Municipality: Ogíjares

Area
  - Total: 6.91 km^{2} (2.67 sq mi)
- Elevation: 732 m (2,402 ft)

Population (2025-01-01)
  - Total: 15,239
  - Density: 2,210/km^{2} (5,710/sq mi)
- Time zone: UTC+1 (CET)
  - Summer (DST): UTC+2 (CEST)

Ogíjares is a municipality located in the central-southern part of the province of Granada, Spain. According to the 2005 census (INE), the city had a population of 11,877 inhabitants.

== Geography ==
Ogíjares is located in the center of a fertile plain, watered by irrigation from the Monachil and Dílar rivers.

== History ==
Ogíjares had its origins as two small Arab farming villages, although utensils and interments from the Visigoths and as far back as the Neolithic have been found locally. The name comes from the Latin phrase "Hortum Sacrum", which translated in Arabic became Ortexica, and then Oxijar. With the Christian conquest of Granada, the two villages became known as High Ogíjar and Low Ogíjar, finally united into what today is Ogíjares. Like many nearby municipalities, Ogíjares has become a suburb of nearby Granada.

== See also ==
- List of municipalities in Granada
