= Carretera de Cádiz =

- District of Málaga
- Country: Spain
- Aut. community: Andalusia
- Municipality: Málaga

Area
  - Total: 5.60 km^{2} (2.16 sq mi)

Population
  - Total: 113,424
  - Density: 20,254.29/km^{2} (52,458.4/sq mi)
- Postal code: 28032
- Málaga district number: 7
- Address of council: Calle Emilio de la Cerda 24, 29002

Carretera de Cádiz, also known as District 7, is one of the 11 districts of the city of Málaga, Spain.

== Wards ==
It comprises de following wards (barrios):

- 25 Años de Paz
- Alaska
- Almudena
- Ardira
- Ave María
- Barceló
- Cortijo Vallejo
- Dos Hermanas
- El Higueral
- El Torcal
- Finca El Pato
- Girón
- Guadaljaire
- Haza de la Pesebrera
- Haza Honda
- Huelin
- Industrial La Pelusa
- Industrial La Térmica
- Industrial Nuevo San Andrés
- Industrial Puerta Blanca
- Jardín de la Abadía
- La Luz
- La Paz
- La Princesa
- Las Delicias
- Los Girasoles
- Los Guindos
- Mainake
- Málaga 2000
- Minerva
- Nuevo San Andrés 1
- Nuevo San Andrés 2
- Pacífico
- Parque Ayala
- Parque Mediterráneo
- Polígono Comercial Guadalhorce
- Polígono Comercial Pacífico
- Polígono Comercial Valdicio
- Polígono Industrial Carranza
- Polígono Industrial Guadaljaire
- Polígono Industrial Los Guindos
- Puerta Blanca
- Regio
- Sacaba Beach
- San Andrés
- San Carlos
- San Carlos Condote
- Santa Isabel
- Santa Paula
- Sixto
- Tabacalera
- Torre del Río
- Torres de la Serna
- Virgen de Belén
- Vistafranca.
