= Alcaracejos =

Coordinates: 38°23′N 4°58′W

Alcaracejos, Spain
- city
- Flag Seal

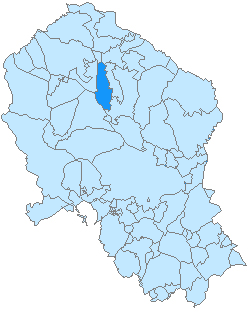
- Country: Spain
- Province: Córdoba
- Municipality: Alcaracejos

Area
  - Total: 177 km^{2} (68 sq mi)
- Elevation: 602 m (1,975 ft)

Population (2025-01-01)
  - Total: 1,512
  - Density: 8.54/km^{2} (22.1/sq mi)
- Time zone: UTC+1 (CET)
  - Summer (DST): UTC+2 (CEST)

Alcaracejos is a city located in Los Pedroches comarca, province of Córdoba, Spain. According to the 2006 census (INE), the city had a population of 1,485.

== See also ==
- Los Pedroches
- List of municipalities in Córdoba
