= Villanueva de Córdoba =

- Municipality
- Seal

- Location in Spain.
- Coordinates: 38°19′N 4°37′W
- Country: Spain
- Autonomous community: Andalusia
- Province: Córdoba
- Comarca: Los Pedroches
- Royal House: House of Silva

Government
  - Mayor: Dolores Sánchez Moreno

Area
  - Total: 427 km^{2} (165 sq mi)
- Elevation: 725 m (2,379 ft)

Population (2025-01-01)
  - Total: 8,328
  - Density: 19.5/km^{2} (50.5/sq mi)
- Demonym: Jarotes
- Time zone: UTC+1 (CET)
  - Summer (DST): UTC+2 (CEST)
- Website: Official website

Villanueva de Córdoba is a municipality located in the province of Córdoba, Spain. As of 2010, the city has a population of 9,599 inhabitants. The city is located in Andalusia, southern Spain, close to the capital of the province of Córdoba.

== History ==
Villanueva de Córdoba was founded in the mid-14th century, when people from the nearby town of Pedroche fled during the outbreak of the Black Death (1348–1350). The first settlement was called Encina Enana (“small holm oak”), and later Villanueva de la Jara. From this name comes the traditional demonym jarotes, used for the inhabitants of the town. In 1553, Emperor Charles I of Spain granted the settlement the title of villa, giving it independence from Pedroche. The town adopted the imperial coat of arms from this document, and it remains in use today as the municipal emblem.

Over time the name changed to Villanueva de Córdoba. In some old documents it also appears as Villanueva de Córdova, reflecting spelling variations in early modern Spanish, but today the standardized and official form is Villanueva de Córdoba.

== Geography ==
The municipality is located in the comarca of Los Pedroches, in northern Córdoba province. It lies at an elevation of about 725 metres above sea level, within the largest continuous dehesa (oak pasture) in Europe. The area is dominated by holm oaks and is used for grazing Iberian pigs and sheep.

The skies over Los Pedroches have been recognized with the international Starlight certification, making the area a popular destination for astrotourism.

== Monuments and Heritage ==
Villanueva de Córdoba preserves a number of historic buildings made of local granite:

- The Church of San Miguel Arcángel, built between 1777 and 1785, with a 35-metre-tall bell tower that is a local landmark.
- The Antigua Audiencia, a 17th-century civic building that now houses part of the local history museum.
- An underground air-raid shelter built in 1937 during the Spanish Civil War, located under the Plaza de España.

The Local History Museum exhibits archaeological finds from prehistoric, Roman, Visigothic, and Muslim times, and includes a reconstructed dolmen.

== Culture and Festivals ==
Villanueva de Córdoba has a calendar of traditional and modern festivals:

- San Sebastián (20 January), marked with bonfires, food, and games.
- Fiesta de la Matanza (February), which recreates traditional pig-slaughter practices.
- Semana Santa, with the distinctive Procesión de las Velas, held two Wednesdays before Good Friday.
- The Romería de la Virgen de Luna, declared a Festival of Tourist Interest in Andalusia.
- The Feria del Jamón Ibérico, a ham fair featuring contests and tastings.
- The Feria de San Miguel, a summer fair celebrated since at least the 16th century.

== Notable events ==
In 2024 the town placed commemorative Stolpersteine (stumbling stones) for nine local men, known as "Los Nueve de Villanueva", who were deported to Nazi concentration camps during World War II. Four of them died at Gusen, while five survived and returned home.

== See also ==
- List of municipalities in Córdoba
