= Torrecampo =

Torrecampo, Spain
- city
- Flag Seal
- Interactive map of Torrecampo, Spain
- Coordinates: 38°28′N 4°40′W
- Country: Spain
- Province: Córdoba
- Municipality: Torrecampo

Area
  - Total: 197 km^{2} (76 sq mi)
- Elevation: 575 m (1,886 ft)

Population (2025-01-01)
  - Total: 992
  - Density: 5.04/km^{2} (13.0/sq mi)
- Time zone: UTC+1 (CET)
  - Summer (DST): UTC+2 (CEST)

Torrecampo is a city located in the province of Córdoba, Spain. According to the 2006 census (INE), the city has a population of 1320 inhabitants.

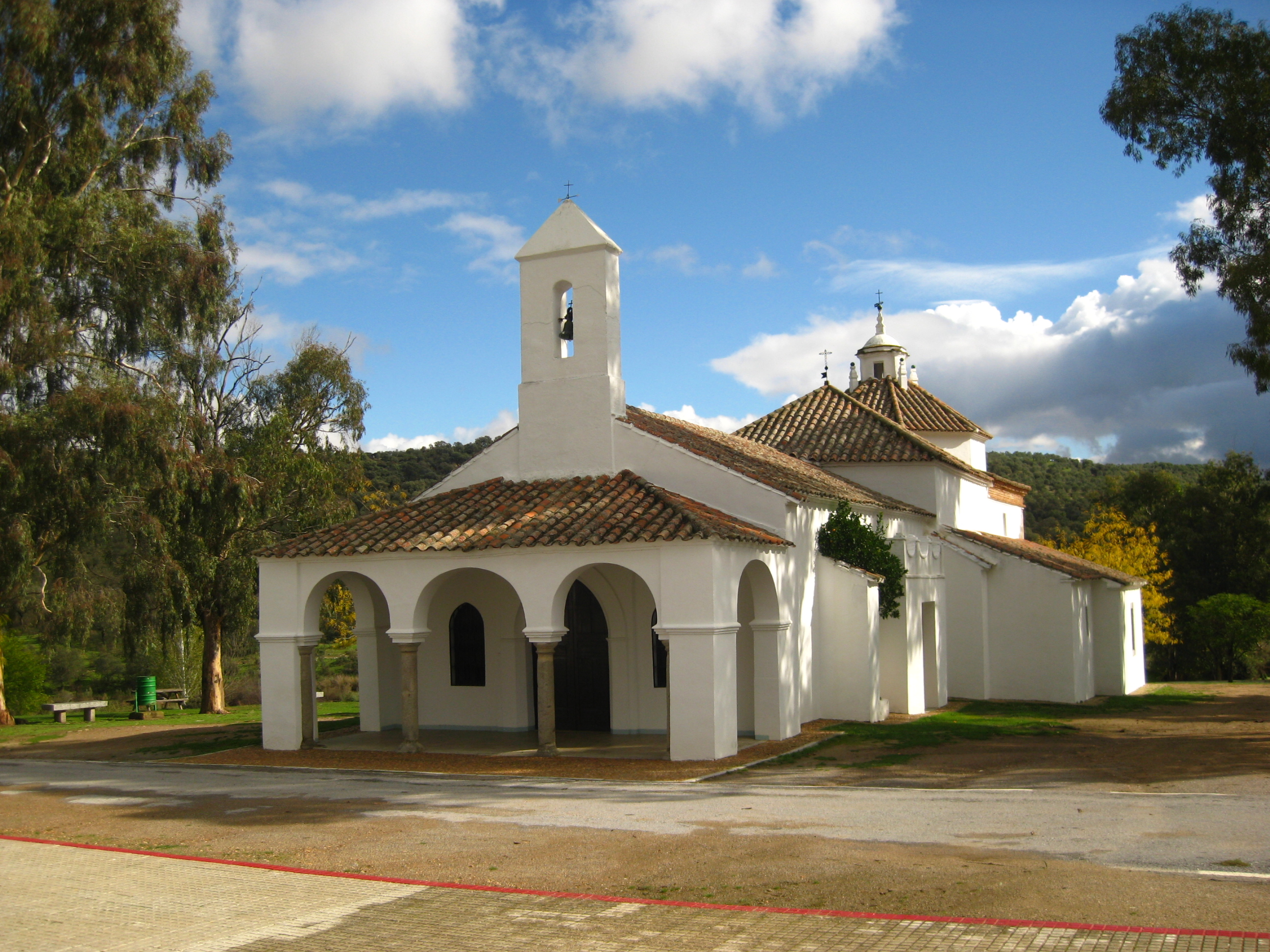
Hermitage Virgen de Veredas in Torrecampo

== See also ==
- List of municipalities in Córdoba
