= Kura (al-Andalus) =

Al-Ándalusian administrative division

Approximate map of the Kūra of the Emirate of Córdoba in 929.

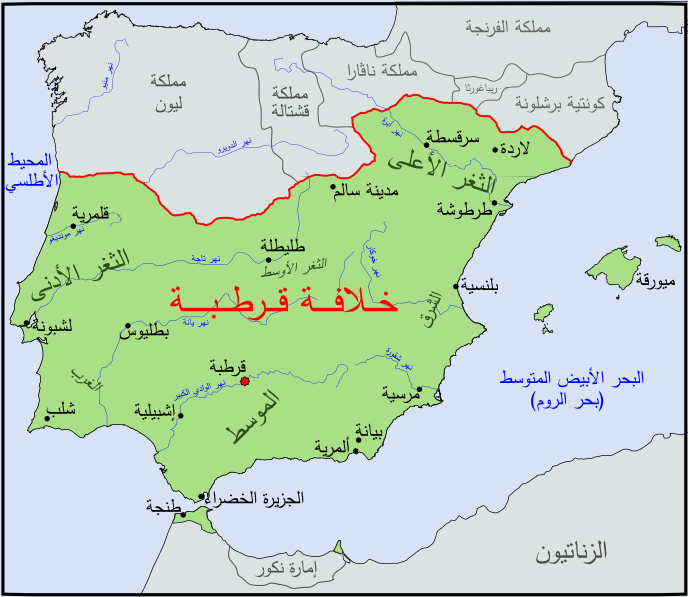
Territorial organization of the Caliphate of Cordoba around the year 1000.

The Kūra was one of the territorial demarcations into which al-Andalus, the ancient Islamic Iberian Peninsula, was divided during the Emirate and Caliphate of Córdoba. It coexisted with another territorial demarcation called March ("thagr"), which overlapped the Kūra in the areas bordering the Christian kingdoms. Both underpinned the al-Andalus territorial organization during the aforementioned periods.

According to the RAE dictionary, the word Kūra (Arabic: كورة, cora) comes from the Greek χῶρα, with the meaning of territory.

A similar territorial/administrative hierarchy existed in the eastern Mediterranean in Bilad al-Sham.

== Territorial organization of al-Andalus ==
The Andalusian Caliphate was organized into six large districts, three inland and three on the borders, all with their respective Kūra. The interior demarcations or regions (nabiya) were: al-Gharb, which covered the present-day province of Huelva and southern Portugal; al-Mawsat or central lands, which extended through the valleys of the Guadalquivir and the Genil, plus the mountainous areas of Andalusia, that is, the ancient Baetica; and al-Sharq or land of the east, which covered the Mediterranean arc, from the present-day province of Murcia to Tortosa. Between these demarcations and the border were the three March: al-Tagr al-Ala or Upper March (Zaragoza); al-Tagr al-Awsat or Middle March (Toledo); and al-Tagr al-Adna or Lower March (Mérida). These March were maintained until the appearance of the Taifa Kingdoms. In the Hispano-Muslim model, the frontier was conceived as a large disorganized strip of separation, outside the March, without forming part of the territorial structure and with very scarce settlement, limited to some specific points, as occurred in the Douro River valley after the abandonment, around 750, of the area by the Berbers initially settled there and the migration of Mozarabs towards the kingdom of Astur-Leon.

Each Kūra was attributed a territory with a capital, in which resided a walí or governor, who lived in the fortified part of the city, or alcazaba. In each Kūra there was also a Qadi or judge. The "March" or "thugur" (plural of thagr), on the other hand, had at their head a military chief called qa'id, whose authority was superimposed on the authorities of the Kūras included in the March.

The Kūras, in turn, were divided into smaller demarcations, called iqlim, which were units of an economic-administrative nature, each with a town or castle as its head. Some authors consider the Kūra to be heirs of the previous Betic demarcations. The demarcation involved the exercise of certain political, administrative, military, economic and judicial powers. The Kūra, as a base demarcation, was used practically throughout the existence of al-Andalus, although complete information is only available from the time of the Caliphate of Córdoba.

In the early days of the Islamic presence in the Iberian Peninsula, within each Kūra, towns were established around castles, called "ḥiṣn" ("ḥuṣûn", in plural), which acted as organizational centers and defenders of a certain territorial area, called "yûz" ("ayzâ", in plural). This administrative structure remained unchanged until the end of the 10th century, when the districts were modified, greatly increasing in size, becoming known as "aqâlîm" ("iqlîm", singular). From the time of the Emirate of Córdoba there is more fragmentary information, although the name and geographic location of a large number of Kūra existing in the 10th century is known (see map). Some authors put the total number of Kūras that existed in al-Ándalus at 40, and other sources establish that their number (excluding those belonging to some of the March) would be around 21-23 demarcations.

In other historical moments, the organization in Kūras was replaced by other types of demarcations, such as the taha, typical of the Nasrid Kingdom of Granada, which existed from the 13th century until 1492 and was the last Islamic state in the Iberian Peninsula.

== Emiral Kūras ==
In contrast to the Caliphate period, information on the territorial organization of the Emirate of Cordoba is scarce and, above all, very fragmentary. From the earliest times of the Emirate there existed the three March, Upper, Middle and Lower, with their corresponding Kūras, although with different denominations and delimitations, in some cases, from those they will have later. It is necessary to take into account that the frequent revolts of the peripheral lords against the Umayyad power, usual throughout the history of al-Andalus, frequently modified the spheres of power of the districts.

=== Kūras corresponding to the following March ===
The following Kūras are identified, within the March:

- Lower March. As will happen during the Caliphate, we have certainty of a single Kūra, called Kūra of Xenxir, with capital in Batalyaws (Badajoz), at least in a first period, and Mérida later. The possible Kūra of al-Lixbuna (Lisbon), could actually have been an iqlim, since also the structure of these had a Qadi at the head of its judicial administration, although there is evidence that it enjoyed autonomy in 808–809, after the Tumlus rebellion.
- Middle March. The capital of the March was in Tulaytulah (present-day Toledo) and its scope practically did not vary between the Emirate and the Caliphate. In it were located the Kūras of al-Belat, ax-Xerrat and al-Ulga. The first of these remained almost unchanged until the fall of the Caliphate. The second occupied territories that would later be attributed to the Kūra of Santaveria, so there is a clear continuity between them. As for al-Ulga, we have no reference to it beyond the year 929, its territory being attributed by the geographer Abu Yaqut to the Kūra of Toledo.
- Upper March. In the Upper March, the following Kūras have been identified during the emiral period: Harkal-Suli, which would later be integrated into the Kūra of Barbitaniya, which extended through the northern part of the current province of Huesca; Az-Zeitum, which comprised what was later the Kūra of Lleida; Arth, which extended through territories of the cities of Zaragoza and Calatayud; al-Shala, which included the northern part of Teruel and would later result in the taifa of Albarracín; and the Kūra of Turtusha, which extended to the border with the Carolingian Empire.

=== Inner Kūras ===
In total, about 16 Kūras are known located in the interior, i.e. not bordering, districts of al-Andalus. Most of them will remain until the end of the Caliphate: Ishbiliya (also called al-Xarraf), Xeduna or Saduna, al-Jazírat or Heira, Qurtuba, Rayya, Ilbira, Yayyán (sometimes called al-Busharrat), Beŷala or Pechina, Tudmir and Balansiya (called in some texts Amur).

Others would disappear with the arrival of the Caliphate, to be integrated into different circumscriptions: Oxuna, al-Fagar, Kunka (to be distributed between Tudmir and Santaveria), Bathr (integrated into Balansiya) and Marmaria (integrated into that of Turtusha). Finally, the Kūra of Kambania becomes Takoronna, and part of its territory passes to that of Rayya.

In any case, there is no certain information on the territorial limits of all of them.

== Caliphal Kūras ==
The information on the Kūra of the Caliphate, much more abundant, comes basically from the 11th century Cordovan historian al-Razi, although there are other sources of the period (al-Muqaddasi, al-Kalbi, Ibn al-Faradi, etc.). Although the different authors who have treated these sources coincide in general lines, some differences of dating and scope can be appreciated among them.

Following Arjona Castro's classification, these Kūras were:

=== Kūras of Gharb al-Ándalus ===
==== Kūra of Labla ====
It was a regular-sized Kūra, which occupied almost the entirety of what is now the province of Huelva. It was bordered by the Algarve, from which it was separated by the Guadiana River, and by the Kūra of Isbiliya, reaching the eastern limit to the Aljarafe and, to the north, to the Sierra. Between Labla and the Sierra was the territory of Andévalo, which at that time was totally uninhabited. The capital of this demarcation was the city of Niebla, and several iqlim have been identified whose heads were Awnaba (Huelva), Aljabal (Almonte), Takuna (Trigueros) and Qashtm (Cartaya), in addition to several cities such as Lapp (Lepe) and Ŷabal al-Uyum (Gibraleón). It was an economically developed Kūra, with tree and shrub crops, predominantly olive, Vitis and fruit trees.

After the fall of the Caliphate, it broke down into two kingdoms: The Taifa of Niebla and the Taifa of Huelva.

==== Kūra of Mārtulah ====
Small Kūra located on the banks of the Guadiana River, in mountainous terrain, which covered the territory that currently corresponds to the district of Beja, although some sources make it descend to the coast. Its capital was located in the city of Mértola. With the end of the Caliphate, it became the Taifa of Mértola.

==== Other possible Kūras ====
In some texts other possible Kūras are noted:

- The city of Huelva and its territory were incorporated into the Kūra of Labla, at least until the end of the Caliphate. Some authors point out its autonomous character, although this probably only occurred just before its conversion into a Taifa.
- Some authors point to the existence of a Kūra of al-Fagar, with capital in the city of Silb (Silves), which would later become the Taifa of Silves. This Kūra existed during the emirate, but it is probable that during the Caliphate it only had autonomy in very specific times of crisis, either at its beginning or at the dissolution of the Caliphate itself.
- The possible existence of the Kūra of Faro, with its head in the city of Faro, and which would later become the taifa of the Algarve, has also been pointed out. In principle, it seems that this region may have belonged, as an iqlim, to the Kūra of Mértola, so that its autonomy would be restricted, in any case, to the final stage of the Caliphate (1009-1031).

=== Kūras of Mawsat al-Ándalus ===
==== Kūra of Isbiliya ====
It was formerly part of the ancient Roman district of Seville. It covered the Sierra de Aracena, the countryside of Seville, the Aljarafe and the Guadalquivir Marshes. Thanks to its agricultural wealth and the craft power of its capital, it had a high population density, especially in the area surrounding it. Its most important cities were: Alcalá de Guadaíra, Talyata (Tejada), Al-Sharaf, Tushana (Tocina), Utrera, Curtugana (Cortegana), Almonaster, Aznalcázar, Lebrija and Puebla del Río.

==== Kūra of Firrish ====
It occupied the northern part of the current province of Seville and part of the province of Badajoz. Its capital was also called Firrish and its location is not completely clear, because while some authors place it in Constantina, for others it was in the municipality of Las Navas de la Concepción. It was a very sparsely populated district, although with mineral and forest resources.

==== Kūra of al-Jazírat ====
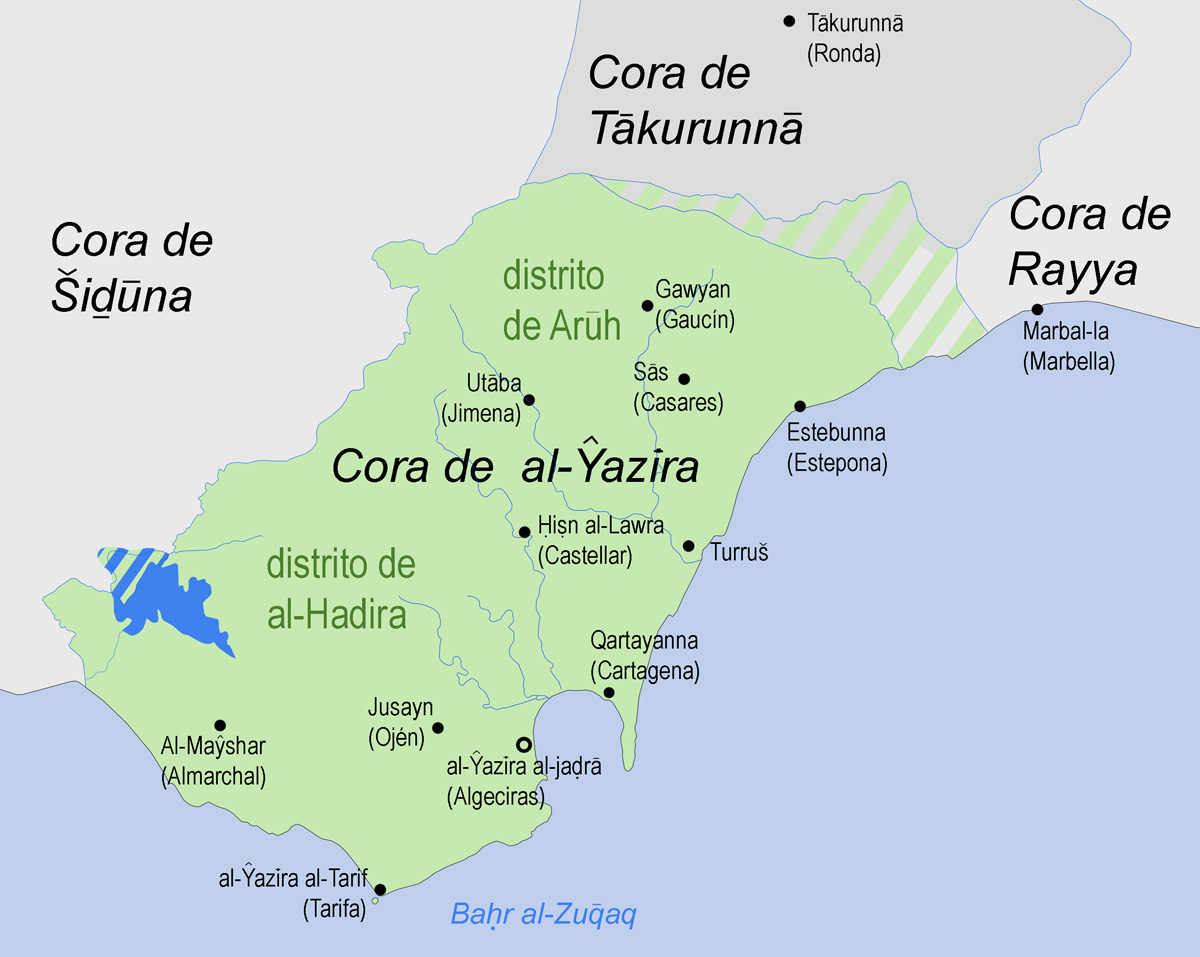
Location of the Kūra of al-Jazírat and bordering areas.

It covered what today is the Campo de Gibraltar and the coast up to Marbella. It was a mountainous area, therefore, with a livestock economy, basically. Its capital was Al-Jazírat al-Jadra (Algeciras), which was also its main commercial and transport port. It was very populated and consisted of several iqlim: Aruh (Castellar de la Frontera), al-Hadira, Olba and others, which included the cities of Gibraltar, Tarifa, Jimena de la Frontera, Gaucin, Ojen, Maysar and Turrush. It was bordered on the north by the Kūra of Takurunna, on the east by the Kūra of Rayya and on the west by the Kūra of Siduna.

==== Kūra of Takoronna ====
It covered the Serranía de Ronda and its capital was the city of Ronda. There are authors who do not cite this Kūra and others who join it to that of Ecija. (Note: Lopez de Coca, for example, together with Sanchez Martinez) In addition to the capital, it included the towns of Ateba (Teba) and Canit (Cañete), as well as possibly Setenil, Grazalema and Olvera, although some authors place these towns in the Kūra of Saduna. It was also a mountainous area, with a poor economy and sparsely populated.

==== Kūra of Rayya ====
This Kūra covered an extensive territory between the southern mountains of the current province of Cordoba, and almost the entire province of Malaga. Its capital, at first, was Medina Arxiduna (Archidona) and, after the fall of the Caliphate, Mālaqa (Málaga). Economically powerful and very populated demarcation, its main cities were Suhayl (Fuengirola), Ballix (Vélez-Málaga), Cártama and Ard-Allah (Ardales). It was a fertile area in agricultural terms, with large tracts of forests, pastures and fertile lowlands.

==== Kūra of Saduna ====
The Kūra of Saduna, Siduna or Sidonia, also known as Jerez, in the current province of Cadiz, comprised the Atlantic coast, between the Guadalquivir and the Barbate River, reaching inland to the countryside and the Sierra de Grazalema. Its capital was, at first, Medina Sidonia and later, after its ruin by the Normans, the disappeared city of Qalsana. It included among others the places of Arcus (Arcos de la Frontera), Qadis (Cádiz), Saluqa de Bahr al-Mada (Sanlúcar de Barrameda), Conil de la Frontera, Jerez de la Frontera and Rota. It was a powerful Kūra, with the valley of the Guadialakka (Guadalete) as an economic and agricultural axis and an important fishing and salting activity.

==== Kūra of Fahs al-Ballut ====
Heir to the ancient Beturia Turdula, it was located in the region of La Serena (southeast of the province of Badajoz), the region of Valle de Alcudia (southwest of the province of Ciudad Real) and the regions of Los Pedroches and Valle del Guadiato (north of the province of Córdoba), with its capital in Bitrawsh (believed to be Pedroche), included the town of Gafiq (believed to be Belalcázar). Even today, these four regions, which once belonged to the same demarcation and are now divided into three provinces and three different autonomous communities, maintain certain links and cultural, social or economic relations.

==== Kūra of Qurtuba ====
It was located along the Guadalquivir River, from the current border of the province of Jaén to Peñaflor, already in the lands of Seville. With its capital in Cordoba, which was a very populous city, it was divided into several iqlim: Wabo (Ovejo), Montemayor, Burŷ al-Hans (Bujalance), Peñaflor, Montoro and Qannit (Cañete de las Torres). It was, therefore, a particularly important Kūra, with centers of political, religious and military power, diverse crafts, industries (such as silk) and rich farmland.

==== Kūra of Istiyya ====
Located in the countryside, with the Genil river as economic and geographical axis, it was a small but very populated Kūra, with the capital in Ecija, an important walled city. It had in its territory populations such as Usuhuna (Osuna), Istapa (Estepa), Lawra (Lora) or Gilena.

==== Kūra of Carmuna ====
Together with the Kūra of Mawrur, it was one of the smallest in al-Andalus, with its capital in the city of Carmona, a city of Tartessian descent, strongly walled and an important commercial and military center. The Kūra was located in the countryside and, except for the capital, it hardly had populations of a certain size, with habitat dispersed in almunias, rich in wells and springs. The only notable nuclei, whose name has survived, were Marshana (Marchena) and Pardish (Paradas).

==== Kūra of Mawrur ====
The smallest of all the Andalusian Kūra, located in the foothills of the Subbetic system, was sustained by olive groves. Its capital was the current Morón de la Frontera and also included the territories of Arahal, Montellano, Puerto Serrano and Coripe.

==== Kūra of Qabra ====
Before the Muslim domination, the lands of this Kūra had belonged to the Betic convent of Ecija. During the Caliphate, it included the southern part of the current province of Córdoba, with the exceptions of Priego, which belonged to the Kūra of Elvira, and towns such as Benamejí, Rute or Iznájar, which were incorporated into the Kūra of Rayya. The capital of the same was the city of Cabra, although sometimes it moved to Baena. In addition, there were Lucena, Lukk (Luque), Aguilar, Monturque and Almodóvar del Río. Its economy was agricultural and livestock, with olive trees and fines herbes as central axes, although there were also orchards next to the large population centers.

==== Kūra of Ŷayyān. ====
It was one of the most extensive of al-Mawsat, extending over the current province of Jaén, plus the north of Granada and Almería and part of the provinces of Ciudad Real and Albacete, since its northeastern limit was located around El Bonillo, since the first population of the neighboring Kūra of Tudmir, according to the classic texts, was Balazote. It included the Guadalquivir Valley, the Almanzora Valley, Sierra Morena, the sierras of Cazorla, Segura, Mágina, Castril and La Sagra, as well as the highland of Huéscar and the southeastern Inner Plateau.

It was, therefore, a rich and powerful Kūra, with varied agricultural production, divided into several iqlim, among them Andújar, Baeza, Jódar, Segura, Huéscar, Baza and Purchena. Apart from the heads of these districts, there were other important towns, such as Arjona, Porcuna, Bedmar, Úbeda and Qayshata (Quesada), as well as castles such as Tixcar.

The capital of the Kūra was located from 711 in one of the oldest cities of the same, Mantïsa (La Guardia de Jaé), until the middle of the 9th century, although there are historians, such as Professor Joaquín Vallvé who point out that it would have been Jódar, the Muslim Šawdar, who acted as such for a time, with the final transfer to the city of Hadira, which later became known as the Kūra itself, Yayyán, which became Jaián and, finally, Jaén.

==== Kūra of Elvira ====
It was also a large Kūra, which covered the coast from Šat (Jete) and what is now La Herradura, west of al-Munacab (Almuñécar, Granada), to the present Guardias Viejas, in Almería. Inland, it reached north to Priego, al-Qibdat (Alcaudete), al-Uqbin (Castillo de Locubín) and Walma (Huelma). Its eastern border was the Guadiana Menor river, thus including the iqlim of Wadi-Aš (Guadix), and encompassing all of the Alpujarra and Sierra Nevada, with Canshayar (Canjáyar) as its head, and the Sierra de Gádor. To the west, the boundary was almost the same as that which currently separates the provinces of Granada and Málaga, although the city of Alhama de Granada belonged to the Kūra of Rayya.

Era una demarcación económicamente pujante, en el aspecto agrícola gracias a las fértiles vegas de su capital, las cuencas de Guadix y Baza y el valle del Almanzora. También contaba con una gran riqueza minera y ganadera communal. La capital estaba situada en Medina Elvira, y, tras la conversión en taifa, en Madinat Garnata, muy próxima an ella, y donde algunos autores sitúan la ciudad de Illiberri o Ilíberis.

==== Kūra of Pechina ====
It was located in the easternmost part of al-Andalus, comprising the current fields of Dalías-El Ejido, the lower valley of the river Andarax and the fields of Tabernas and Níjar. The capital was initially Pechina, although its peripheral situation (the valley of the Almanzora belonged to Yayyán) and interior made the capital move to al-Mariya (Almería), which already had an important port. In spite of this, it kept its name.

==== Other possible Kūras ====
Some sources, such as López de Coca cite some Kūra that are not included in the other studies. These are in all cases small partitions of Kūras already cited, possibly from the end of the Caliphate period. Specifically, he lists three new demarcations:

- The Kūra of Medina Gagha, in the municipality of Priego de Córdoba, which may have been separated from Elvira in the early period.
- The Kūra of Osuna, which would be a partition of the already small Kūra of Ecija.
- The Kūra of Baza, which would be a sedition of that of Yayyán, a reasonable option given its peripheral character and very distant from the capital.

=== Kūra of Sharq al-Andalus ===
==== Kūra of Tudmir ====
From the mid 8th century until 1031 it was a Kūra in the territory of al-Andalus, with its capital in Madinat al-Mursiya (Murcia), after its foundation in 825 by order of Abderramán II. The Kūra occupied the territory of the current Region of Murcia, the province of Alicante, Hellín and part of Albacete, territory that until then, and since 713, was known as the Kingdom of Tudmir. It was probably created after the administrative reforms promoted by Abderramán I, when he proclaimed the independent emirate. It continued to be so in the Umayyad Caliphate period and was definitively restructured by the withdrawal of the cities to the interior, due to the threats of the Vikings and other tribes from northern Europe in 844.

According to the abundant data collected in his work by the Andalusian historian al-Udri, Tudmir included numerous cities, among which are Uryula (Orihuela), Laqant (Alicante), Mula (Mula or La Mola {Novelda}), Bqsara (Begastri {Cehegín, Murcia} or Bogarra {Caudete, Albacete}), Blntla or Billana (Valentula {Elche} or Villena), Lawrka (Lorca), Iyya or Illa (Eio, which the authors identify with the ancient Roman Ilunum {Hellín}), with the Murcian district of Algezares where the remains of a Byzantine basilica and a great palace have appeared, or with Elda, and Ilsh (Elche). There is no unanimity among the different authors on the northern limit of this Kūra, as some extend it to the mountainous region near Dénia, while others consider that this area belonged to the Kūra of Valencia. Some authors also attribute to it the city of Huéscar, which is usually considered part of the Kūra of Yayyán or that of Elvira.

After the fall of the Caliphate, it was divided among several taifas: Murcia, Dénia (plus Balearic Islands) and Granada (910-1031).

==== Kūra of Balansya ====
The Kūra of Balansya occupied approximately what is today the province of Valencia and was bordered to the south by that of Tudmir, and to the north by that of Turtusha. It was a second-order Kūra, since in the 10th century the economic and demographic weight of the Valencia area was scarce. In its geographical area there were two relevant cities: Xàtiva and Dénia. There is evidence that, around 929, there was a governor in Xàtiva, different from that of Valencia, which may suggest that, at some point, it formed a separate Kūra. Towards the end of the Caliphate, given the small size of this Kūra, it was unified with that of Tortosa and the Balearic Islands were attached to it.

==== Kūra of Turtusha ====
It is a peripheral Kūra, with its capital in the city of Tortosa, very sparsely populated and economically not very active. It covered the north of the current province of Castellón, the lower course and the area of the Ebro delta, as well as some regions of the province of Tarragona, and it usually included the town of Morella, although not always. It was bordered by the Kūras of Lleida and Zaragoza, included in the Upper March. For some time, at the end of the Caliphate it was united with the Kūra of Balansya. Later, it became the Taifa of Tortosa.

=== Kūras of the Lower March ===
==== Kūra of Merida ====
Integrated in the Lower March, it extended through the current Extremadura and southern Portugal, to the Atlantic Ocean, with its capital in the city of Mérida, which gave it its name, or in Badajoz, depending on the time. Its demarcation came from the old late Roman Lusitanian division, which had been formed as a Kūra in the Emirate period under the name of Xenxir. It was one of the most extensive and economically thriving, although its proximity to the Christian border gave it a predominantly military character. After the dissolution of the Caliphate, it became the Taifa of Badajoz.

=== Kūras of the Central March ===
==== Kūra of Toledo ====
In addition to being the capital of the Central March, the city of Toledo was the head of a Kūra of the same name that, according to some authors, extended south to the Kūra of Yayyan. It included various iqlim, among which was that of Fahs al-Luyy, whose capital was Qasr 'Atiyya (Alcázar de San Juan). In addition to the other Kūras of the March, it also bordered, at its eastern end, with that of Tudmir.

==== Kūra of al-Belat ====
It was located in the north of the current provinces of Cáceres and Toledo, with its capital in Medina al-Belat (Albalá), a walled fortress next to the Tagus River, near the Almaraz bridge. It was a demarcation economically not very active and sparsely populated. Its existence dates back to the 10th and 11th centuries, and it was integrated into the Central March, which meant that it was militarily dependent on Toledo. With the disappearance of the Caliphate, it was integrated into the Taifa kingdom of Toledo.

==== Kūra of Santaveria ====
It occupied a territory somewhat larger than that which today integrates the provinces of Cuenca, part of the province of Guadalajara and Teruel. Its northeastern limit reached the source of the Tagus River, the valley of the Turia River, up to Tirwal (Teruel) and, continuing along the depression of the Jiloca River, it reached Qalamusa (Calamocha, Teruel). Towards the west, it reached Mulin (Molina de Aragón, Guadalajara), bordering the Tagus River up to a certain point between the castle of Welid and the Toledan mountain of Awkaniya (Ocaña, Toledo), in the south. From there it extended to Uclés and, along the Cabriel river, to the Turia, closing its demarcation. It seems to be heir to an old Visigoth division, the so-called Hitación de Wamba with the three bishoprics located in Cuenca: Valeria, Segóbriga and Ercávica plus other areas incorporated in the Muslim period.

It was a sparsely populated and economically weak Kūra, attached to the Central March. The capital of this Kūra will vary: initially located in Shantaberiya (Ercávica), then in Uklís (Uclés), later in Walma (Huélamo) and al-Qannit (Cañete), which was the capital in the Caliphate period and, finally, in Qunka (Cuenca), founded by al-Mansur in 999. With the disappearance of the Caliphate, it became part of the Taifa of Toledo.

=== Kūras of the Upper March ===
On the basis of the information transmitted by Al-Udri, we know that in the Upper March the territory was divided between the Kūras of:

- Barbitaniya, which extended through the northern part of the current province of Huesca, with its capital in Barbastro, and also included the cities of Boltaña and Alquézar.
- Washka, with head in the city of the same name, included the fortress of Bolea.
- Lleida, which was of very small size, including the cities of Mequinenza and Fraga.
- Zaragoza, was the main Kūra of the Upper March, both politically and economically. Its capital was in the city of Zaragoza, and it had several important population centers: Zuera, Ricla, Muel, Belchite, Alcañiz and Calanda. After the disappearance of the Caliphate, it became the head of the Taifa of Saragossa, which encompassed a large part of the March.
- Calatayud, which included, in addition to the capital, the towns of Maluenda and Daroca.
- Tudela, which included the towns of Tarazona and Borja, and extended into present-day La Rioja.
- Barusa, the smallest of the Kūra of the Caliphate, organized on the axis of the Piedra river, with capital in Molina de Aragón, and bordering with Santaveria, already in the Central March.

For some authors, the first two Kūras cited above formed a military subdivision of the Upper March, called Farthest March (al-Thagr al-Aqsa).

== Kūras after the fall of the Caliphate. ==
The prolonged crisis of the Caliphate of Córdoba, between 1009 and 1031, prompted the rulers of the Kūra, as well as some powerful families of important cities, to assume the political and military powers previously in the hands of the central power. Thus, most of the caliphal Kūras became Taifa kingdoms, maintaining in general terms their territorial scope. In fact, independence was achieved as a consolidation of the recognition of the caliphal rulers themselves, granting them the titles of vizier, honorary laqab and other distinctions.

Insufficient information is available to trace the territorial organization of these taifa kingdoms, although it seems that, as a general rule, they maintained the division into iqlim districts. Nevertheless, power tended to be highly centralized in the sultan.

After the fatwa that in 1090 put an end to the Taifa kingdoms, incorporating them into the Almoravid dynasty, governors were established in all the territorial circumscriptions, coinciding with the scope of the different Kūra, so that in a certain way the previous structure of Kūras was restored, although the figure of a qa'id or military commander was instituted in all of them and their dependence on the central power was quite strong.

After the second period of taifas, the Almohads established a highly centralized state, with absolute power, and in which the trace of the Kūra system was practically abolished.

== See also ==
- Ibn al-Khatib (1313-1374)
