= Seville metropolitan area =

- urban area
- Seville metropolitan area (in red) inside Seville Province
- Country: Spain
- Region: Andalusia
- Largest city: Seville; 684,164 inhabitants (2023)

Area
  - Metro: 4,962.06 km^{2} (1,915.86 sq mi)

Population (1 January 2023)
  - Density: 311.4/km^{2} (807/sq mi)
  - Metro: 1,555,875 ▲
- Time zone: UTC+1 (CET)

The Seville metropolitan area is an urban area in Andalusia (Spain) centered on the city of Seville. With a population of over 1.5 million people, it is the fourth largest urban area in Spain, after Madrid, Barcelona and Valencia. It is also the largest urban area in Andalusia and Southern Spain.

== Geography ==
The Seville metropolitan area is composed by 46 municipalities, in whose center lies the city of Seville (which represents about half of the population). The area can be divided further into 4 regions.

The western part coincides with the Aljarafe region. It is the most populated area after the Seville itself, with roughly 400,000 inhabitants. It lies on the western bank of the Guadalquivir river. The largest city is Mairena del Aljarafe, the fifth largest city in the Province of Seville

The southern part lies along the Autovía A-4 highway, connecting Seville and Cádiz. Over 220,000 people live in this area, of which 140,000 are in Dos Hermanas, the second largest city in the province.

The eastern area is made up of several municipalities in the Baetic Depression. More than 150,000 people live in this area, half of which live in Alcalá de Guadaira, the third largest city in the province.

The northern area contains several municipalities between the city of Seville and Sierra Morena. This area accounts over 100,000 people. Its largest municipality is La Rinconada, the sixth largest city in the province.

== Municipalities ==
Municipality	Area (km²)	Population (INE 2022)	Population (INE 2023)	Density (people per km²)	Average income (€) (IEA 2018)
Albaida del Aljarafe	10.93	3,236	3,259	294.7	18,198
Alcalá de Guadaíra	284.61	75,917	76,829	265.4	24,925
Alcalá del Río	81.97	12,315	12,304	149.6	20,883
La Algaba	17.68	16,491	16,688	932.3	21,636
Almensilla	14.31	6,415	6,565	439.3	23,048
Aznalcázar	449.84	4,664	4,853	10.3	19,645
Aznalcóllar	198.96	6,011	6,081	30.5	19,197
Benacazón	32.16	7,299	7,344	227.7	20,090
Bollullos de la Mitación	62.36	11,136	11,162	178.0	24,729
Bormujos	12.17	22,536	22,809	1,840.0	30,511
Brenes	21.45	12,652	12,815	586.5	18,926
Camas	11.65	27,443	28,181	2,359.7	23,179
Carmona	924.11	29,279	29,698	31.5	21,013
Carrión de los Céspedes	6.01	2,562	2,594	430.4	19,321
Castilleja de Guzmán	2.06	2,866	2,881	1,388.0	30,309
Castilleja de la Cuesta	2.23	17,230	17,196	7,787.4	23,619
Castilleja del Campo	16.22	624	625	39.0	16,550
Coria del Río	61.99	30,714	30,916	496.4	20,535
Dos Hermanas	160.52	137,561	138,991	848.8	25,379
Espartinas	22.74	16,401	16,548	705.7	33,322
Gelves	8.18	10,317	10,405	1,258.6	30,092
Gerena	129.90	7,774	7,835	59.6	22,066
Gines	2.90	13,507	13,516	4,665.2	29,699
Guillena	226.63	13,279	13,735	57.6	22,578
Huévar del Aljarafe	57.58	3,209	3,294	54.3	20,656
Isla Mayor	114.38	5,767	5,751	50.9	17,106
Mairena del Alcor	69.72	23,938	24,161	342.7	21,829
Mairena del Aljarafe	17.70	47,161	47,515	2,649.4	30,304
Olivares	102.53	9,444	9,458	92.2	19,437
Los Palacios y Villafranca	109.47	38,662	38,700	353.3	18,888
Palomares del Río	13.00	9,083	9,161	693.8	28,600
Pilas	45.94	13,964	14,108	301.6	17,432
La Puebla del Río	374.73	11,855	11,854	31.7	20,405
La Rinconada	139.48	39,509	40,176	281.1	21,409
Salteras	57.46	5,616	5,646	98.3	25,168
San Juan de Aznalfarache	4.11	22,138	22,685	5,374.2	23,028
Sanlúcar la Mayor	135.41	14,120	14,161	103.6	22,062
Santiponce	8.42	8,507	8,585	1,008.4	21,659
Sevilla	141.31	681,998	684,164	4,842.1	30,026
Tomares	5.17	25,341	25,492	4,907.2	34,187
Umbrete	11.90	9,253	9,371	763.5	21,535
Utrera	684.26	51,402	51,857	74.7	21,338
Valencina de la Concepción	25.14	7,988	8,042	314.0	31,601
Villamanrique de la Condesa	57.67	4,580	4,638	78.6	15,290
Villanueva del Ariscal	4.70	6,715	6,843	1,419.7	20,701
El Viso del Alcor	20.40	19,161	19,262	943.7	19,173
Total	4,962.06	1,547,640	1,555,875	311.4	26,604

== Transportation ==
Seville Metro line 1 western end is located in Mairena del Aljarafe. It also crosses San Juan de Aznalfarache before entering the city of Seville. The eastern end is located in Montequinto, a district of Dos Hermanas.

The area also has a commuter rail system: Cercanías Sevilla. Line C1 runs through the metropolitan area from north to south, while Line C3 only services the north. Line C5 connects Seville to the northwestern region of Aljarafe.

== See also ==
- Algeciras Bay Metropolitan Area, a nearby metropolitan area in Andalusia.
- List of metropolitan areas in Spain
