= Almadén de la Plata =

Coordinates: 37°52′N 6°04′W

- Coat of arms

- Location in Spain.
- Country: Spain
- Autonomous community: Andalusia

Area
  - Total: 256.02 km^{2} (98.85 sq mi)
- Elevation: 451 m (1,480 ft)

Population (2025-01-01)
  - Total: 1,328
  - Density: 5.187/km^{2} (13.43/sq mi)
- Time zone: UTC+1 (CET)
  - Summer (DST): UTC+2 (CEST)
- Website: www.almadendelaplata.es

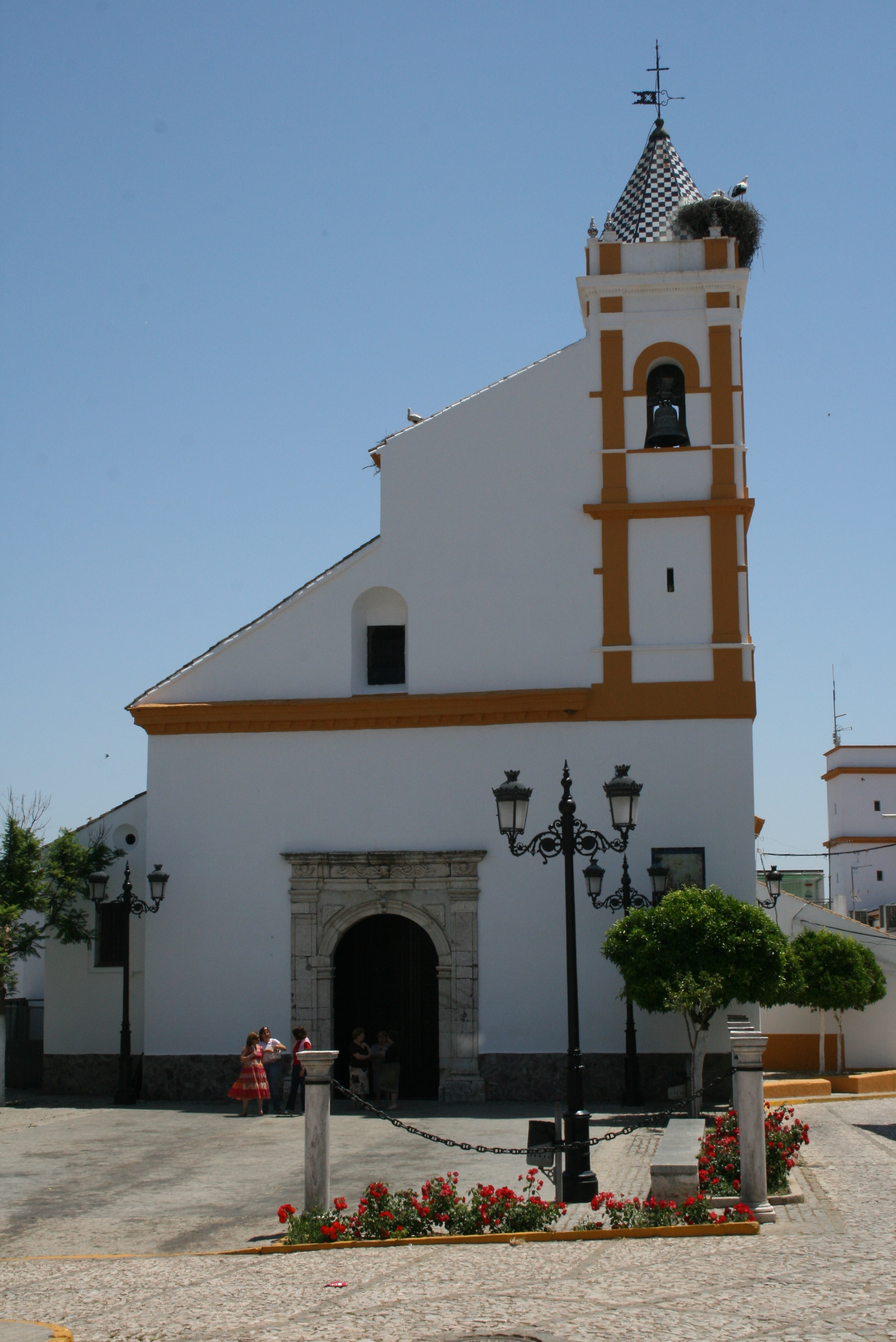
Almadén de la Plata

Almadén de la Plata is a municipality in Seville, Spain. It had a population of 1,696 in 2005 and has population density of 6.6 people per km^{2}, with a total area of about 256 km^{2}. It is located at an altitude of 450 meters and is 59 kilometers from Seville.

== See also ==
- List of municipalities in Seville
