= El Pedroso =

El Pedroso, Spain
- City
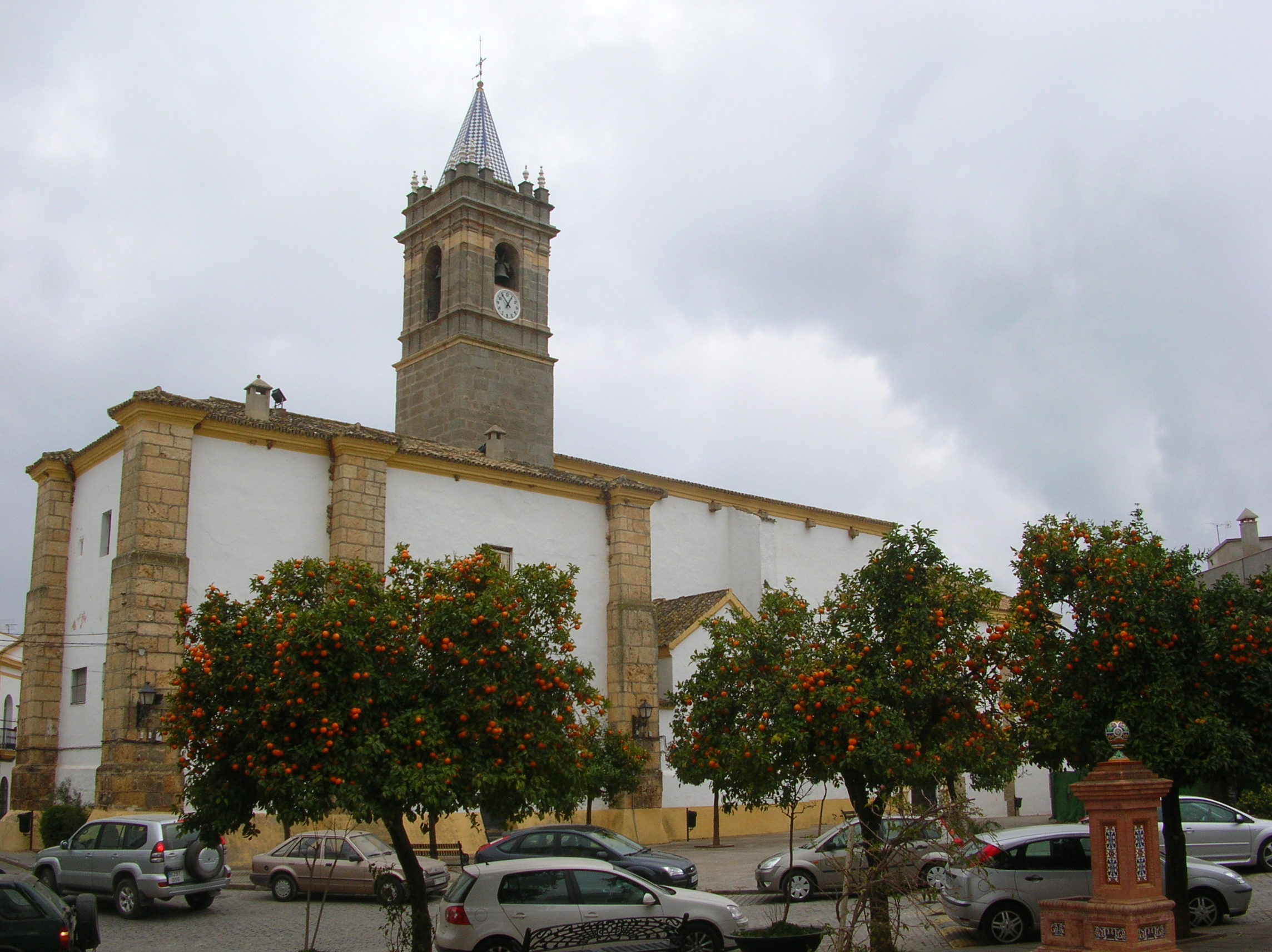
- View of El Pedroso

- Coat of arms

- Location within Spain
- Coordinates: 37°50′N 5°45′W
- Country: Spain
- Province: Seville
- Municipality: El Pedroso

Area
  - Total: 314 km^{2} (121 sq mi)
- Elevation: 414 m (1,358 ft)

Population (2025-01-01)
  - Total: 2,062
  - Density: 6.57/km^{2} (17.0/sq mi)
- Time zone: UTC+1 (CET)
  - Summer (DST): UTC+2 (CEST)

El Pedroso is a city located in the province of Seville, Spain. According to the 2005 census (INE), the city has a population of 2291 inhabitants.

== See also ==
- List of municipalities in Seville
