= Villanueva de San Juan =

Villanueva de San Juan, Spain
- city
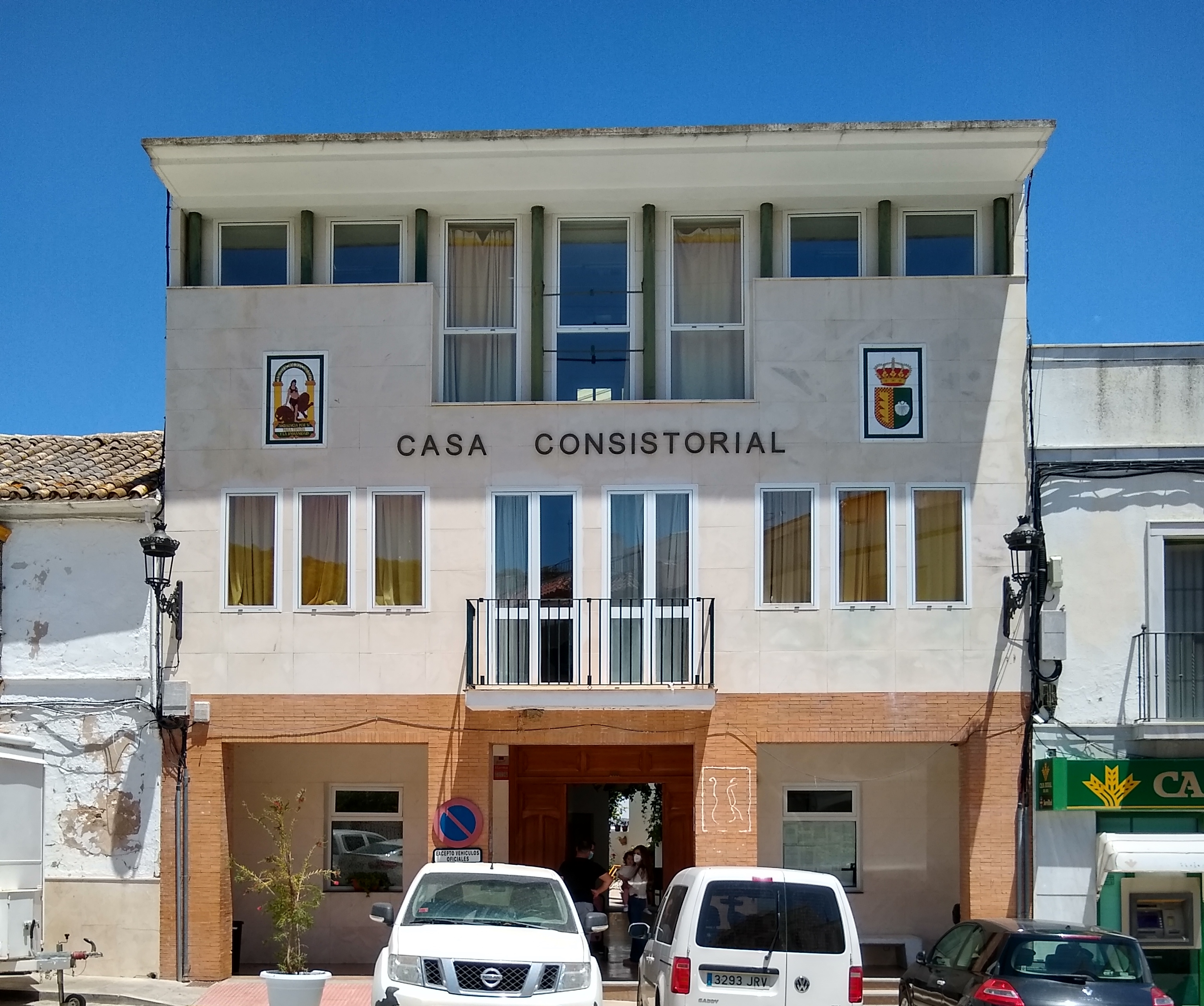
- Town hall

- Flag Coat of arms
- Interactive map of Villanueva de San Juan, Spain
- Coordinates: 37°03′N 5°10′W
- Country: Spain
- Province: Seville
- Municipality: Villanueva de San Juan

Area
  - Total: 34 km^{2} (13 sq mi)

Population (2025-01-01)
  - Total: 986
  - Density: 29/km^{2} (75/sq mi)
- Time zone: UTC+1 (CET)
  - Summer (DST): UTC+2 (CEST)

Villanueva de San Juan is a city located in the province of Seville, Spain. According to the 2005 census, the city has a population of 1440 inhabitants.

== See also ==
- List of municipalities in Seville
