= El Ronquillo =

El Ronquillo, Spain
- city
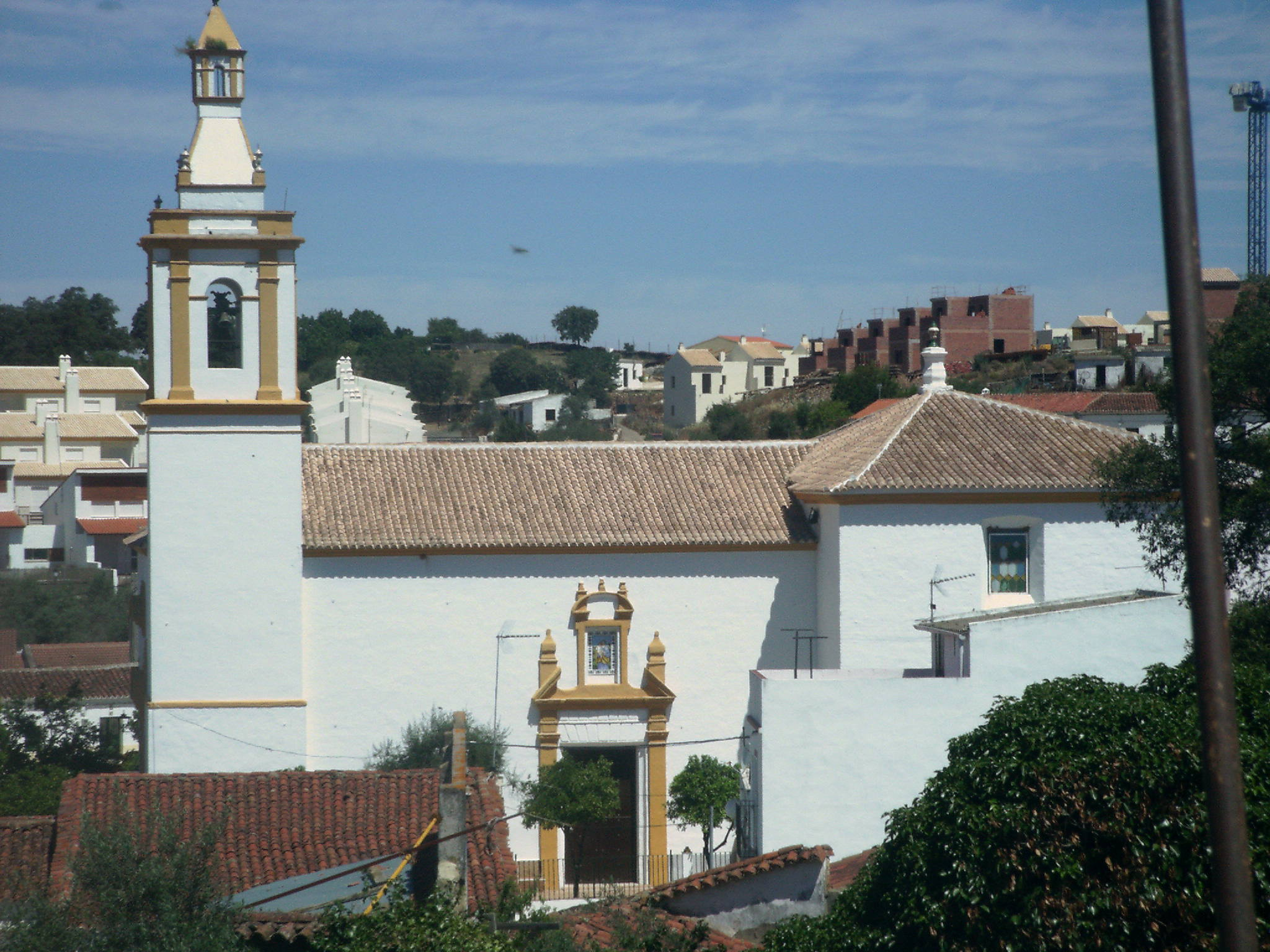

- Flag Coat of arms
- Interactive map of El Ronquillo, Spain
- Coordinates: 37°43′N 6°10′W
- Country: Spain
- Province: Seville
- Municipality: El Ronquillo

Area
  - Total: 76 km^{2} (29 sq mi)
- Elevation: 352 m (1,155 ft)

Population (2025-01-01)
  - Total: 1,453
  - Density: 19/km^{2} (50/sq mi)
- Time zone: UTC+1 (CET)
  - Summer (DST): UTC+2 (CEST)

El Ronquillo is a town in the province of Seville, Spain. According to the 2005 census (Instituto Nacional de Estadística), the city has a population of 1,381 inhabitants.

== See also ==
- List of municipalities in Seville
