= Badolatosa =

Coordinates: 37°18′N 4°40′W

Badolatosa, Spain
- Coat of arms
- Interactive map of Badolatosa, Spain
- Country: Spain
- Province: Seville
- Municipality: Badolatosa

Area
  - Total: 48 km^{2} (19 sq mi)
- Elevation: 236 m (774 ft)

Population (2025-01-01)
  - Total: 3,058
  - Density: 64/km^{2} (170/sq mi)
- Time zone: UTC+1 (CET)
  - Summer (DST): UTC+2 (CEST)

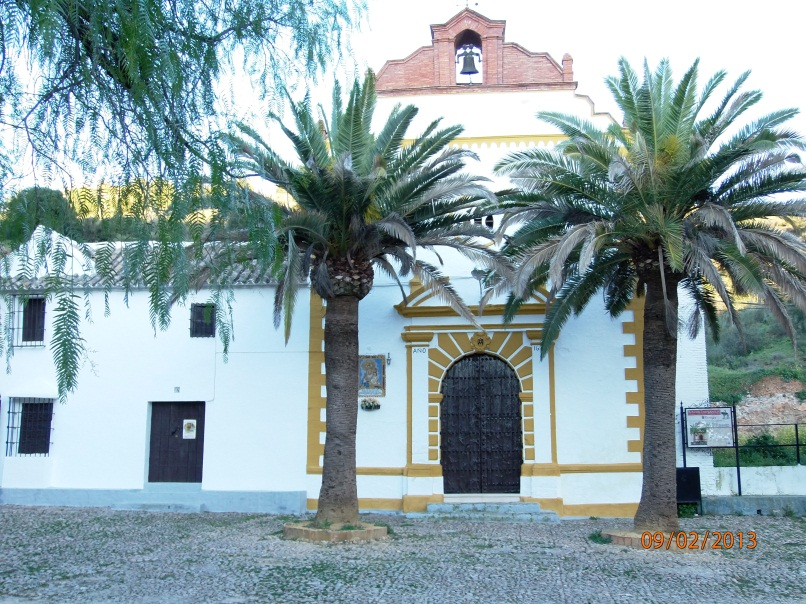
Badolatosa

Badolatosa is a city located in the province of Seville, Spain. According to the 2005 census (INE), the city has a population of 3198 inhabitants.

== See also ==
- List of municipalities in Seville
