= El Castillo de las Guardas =

El Castillo de las Guardas, Spain
- Municipality
- Flag Coat of arms
- Interactive map of El Castillo de las Guardas, Spain
- Coordinates: 37°41′N 6°18′W
- Country: Spain
- Province: Seville
- Comarca: Sierra Norte de Sevilla

Area
  - Total: 260 km^{2} (100 sq mi)
- Elevation: 347 m (1,138 ft)

Population (2025-01-01)
  - Total: 1,501
  - Density: 5.8/km^{2} (15/sq mi)
- Time zone: UTC+1 (CET)
  - Summer (DST): UTC+2 (CEST)

El Castillo de las Guardas is a city located in the province of Seville, Spain. According to the 2005 census (INE), the city has a population of 1619 inhabitants.

== See also ==
- List of municipalities in Seville
