= List of municipalities in Seville =

Map of Spain with the province of Seville highlighted

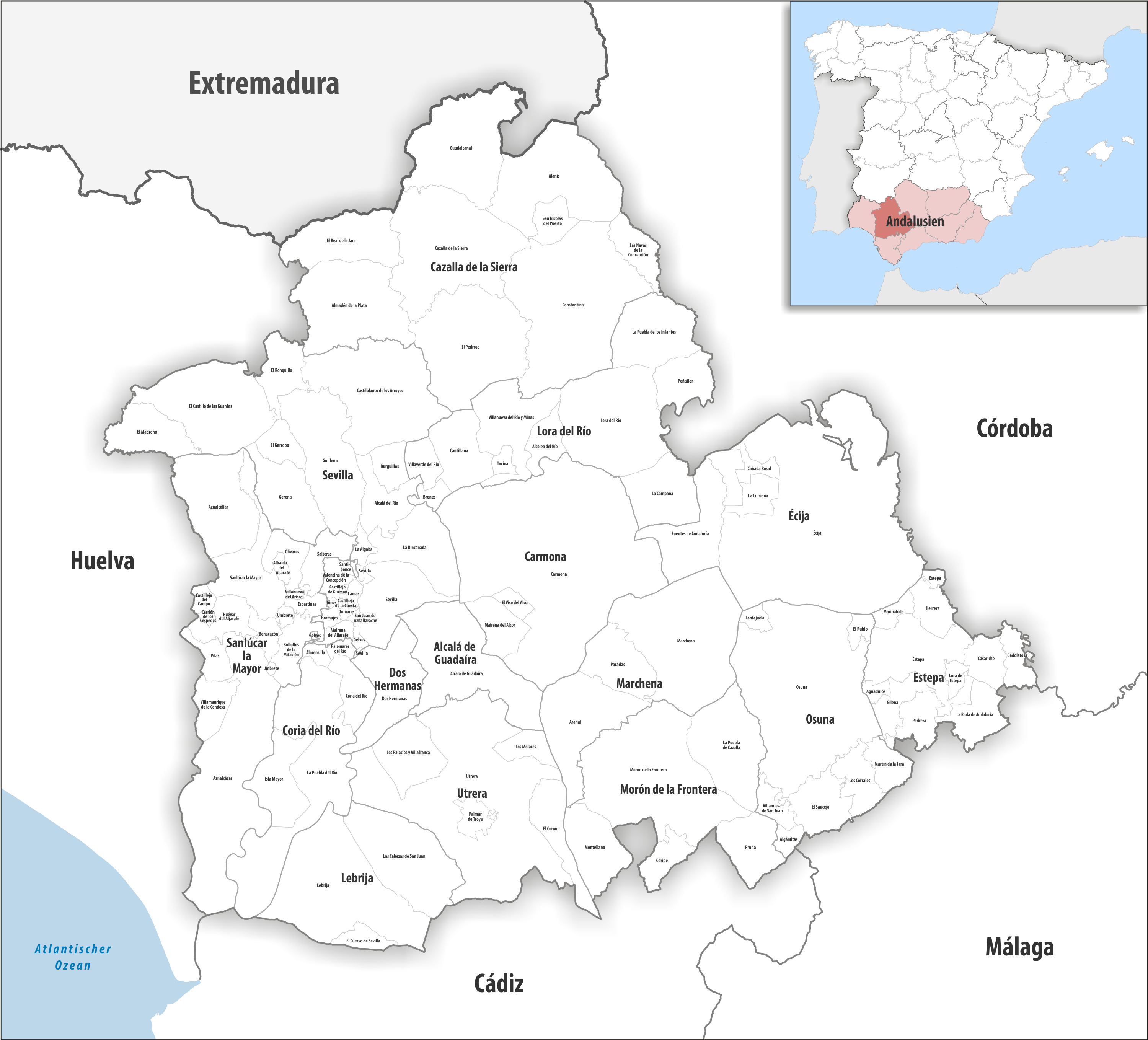
Map of the municipalities in the province of Seville

Seville is a province in the autonomous community of Andalusia, Spain. The province is divided into 106 municipalities. As of the 2024 Spanish census, Seville is the 5th most populous of Spain's 50 provinces, with 1,968,624 inhabitants, and the 12th largest by land area, spanning 14,036.15 square kilometres (5,419.39 sq mi). Municipalities are the most basic local political division in Spain and can only belong to one province. They enjoy a large degree of autonomy in their local administration, being in charge of tasks such as urban planning, water supply, lighting, roads, local police, and firefighting.

The organisation of municipalities in Spain is outlined by the local government law Ley 7/1985, de 2 de abril, Reguladora de las Bases del Régimen Local (transl. Law 7/1985, of 2 April, Regulating the Bases of the Local Administration), which was passed by the Cortes Generales—Spain's national parliament—on 2 April 1985 and finalised by royal decree on 18 April 1986. Municipalities in Seville are also governed by the Statute of Autonomy of Andalusia, which includes provisions concerning their relations with Andalusia's autonomous government. All citizens of Spain are required to register in the municipality in which they reside. Each municipality is a corporation (Note: Within the context of local government in Spain, a corporation is a legal entity representing a municipality. Each municipality is empowered to govern over a specific piece of land and its population.) with independent legal personhood: its governing body is called the ayuntamiento (municipal council or corporation), a term often also used to refer to the municipal offices (city and town halls). The ayuntamiento is composed of the mayor (Spanish: alcalde), the deputy mayors (tenientes de alcalde) and the councillors (concejales), who form the plenary (pleno), the deliberative body. Municipalities are categorised by population for determining the number of councillors: three when the population is up to 100 inhabitants, five for 101–250, seven for 251–1,000, nine for 1,001–2,000, eleven for 2,001–5,000, thirteen for 5,001–10,000, seventeen for 10,001–20,000, twenty-one for 20,001–50,000, and twenty-five for 50,001–100,000. One councillor is added for every additional 100,000 inhabitants, with a further one included if the total would otherwise be even, to avoid tied votes.

The mayor and the deputy mayors are elected by the plenary assembly, which is itself elected by universal suffrage. Elections in municipalities with more than 250 inhabitants are carried out following a proportional representation system with closed lists, whilst those with a population lower than 250 use a block plurality voting system with open lists. The plenary assembly must meet periodically, with meetings occurring more or less frequently depending on the population of the municipality: monthly for those whose population is larger than 20,000, once every two months if it ranges between 5,001 and 20,000, and once every three months if it does not exceed 5,000. Many ayuntamientos also have a local governing board (Spanish: junta de gobierno local), which is appointed by the mayor from amongst the councillors and is required for municipalities of over 5,000 inhabitants. The board, whose role is to assist the mayor between meetings of the plenary assembly, may not include more than one third of the councillors.

The largest municipality by population in the province as of the 2024 Spanish census is Seville, its capital, with 686,741 residents, while the smallest is El Madroño, with 305 residents. The largest municipality by area is Écija, which spans 978.47 square kilometres (377.79 sq mi), while Castilleja de Guzmán is the smallest at 2.04 square kilometres (0.79 sq mi).

== Municipalities ==
Largest municipalities in the province of Seville by population

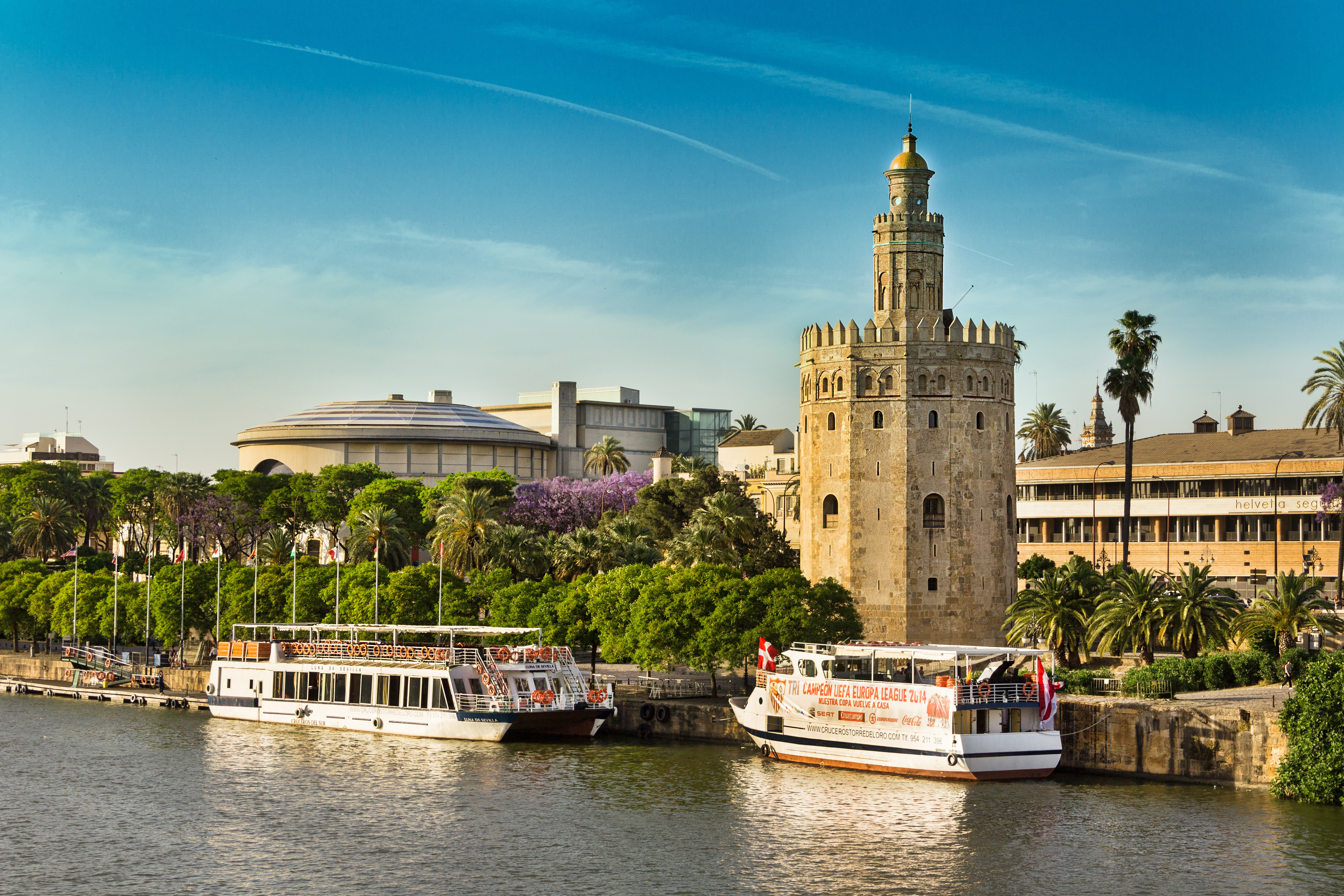
Seville is the province's capital and largest municipality by population.

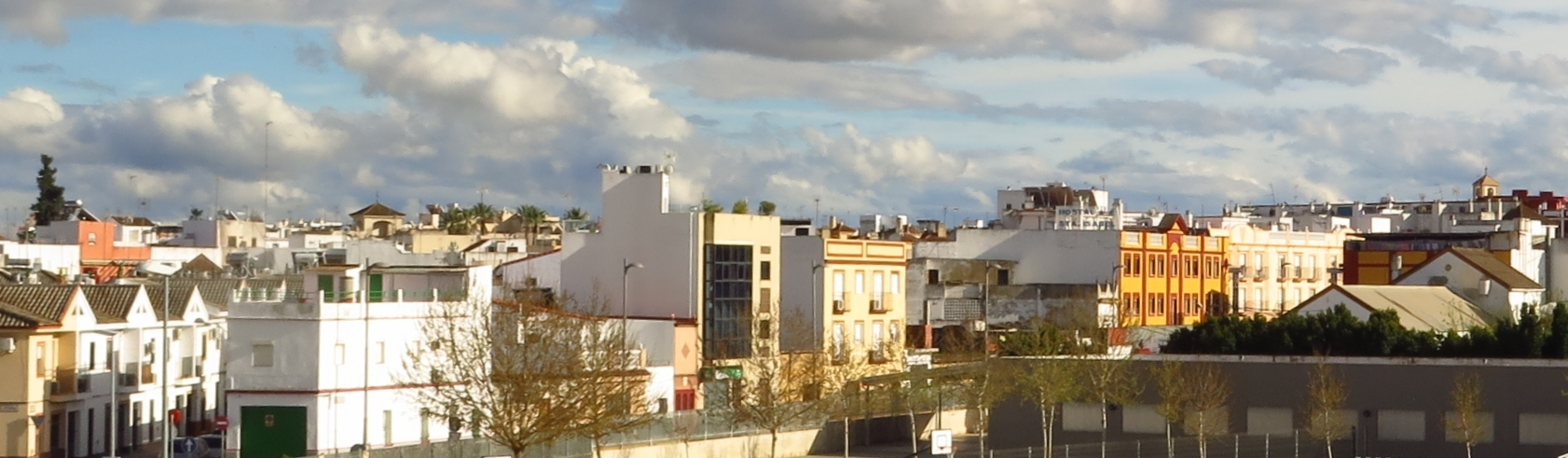
Dos Hermanas, the second largest municipality by population in the province of Seville

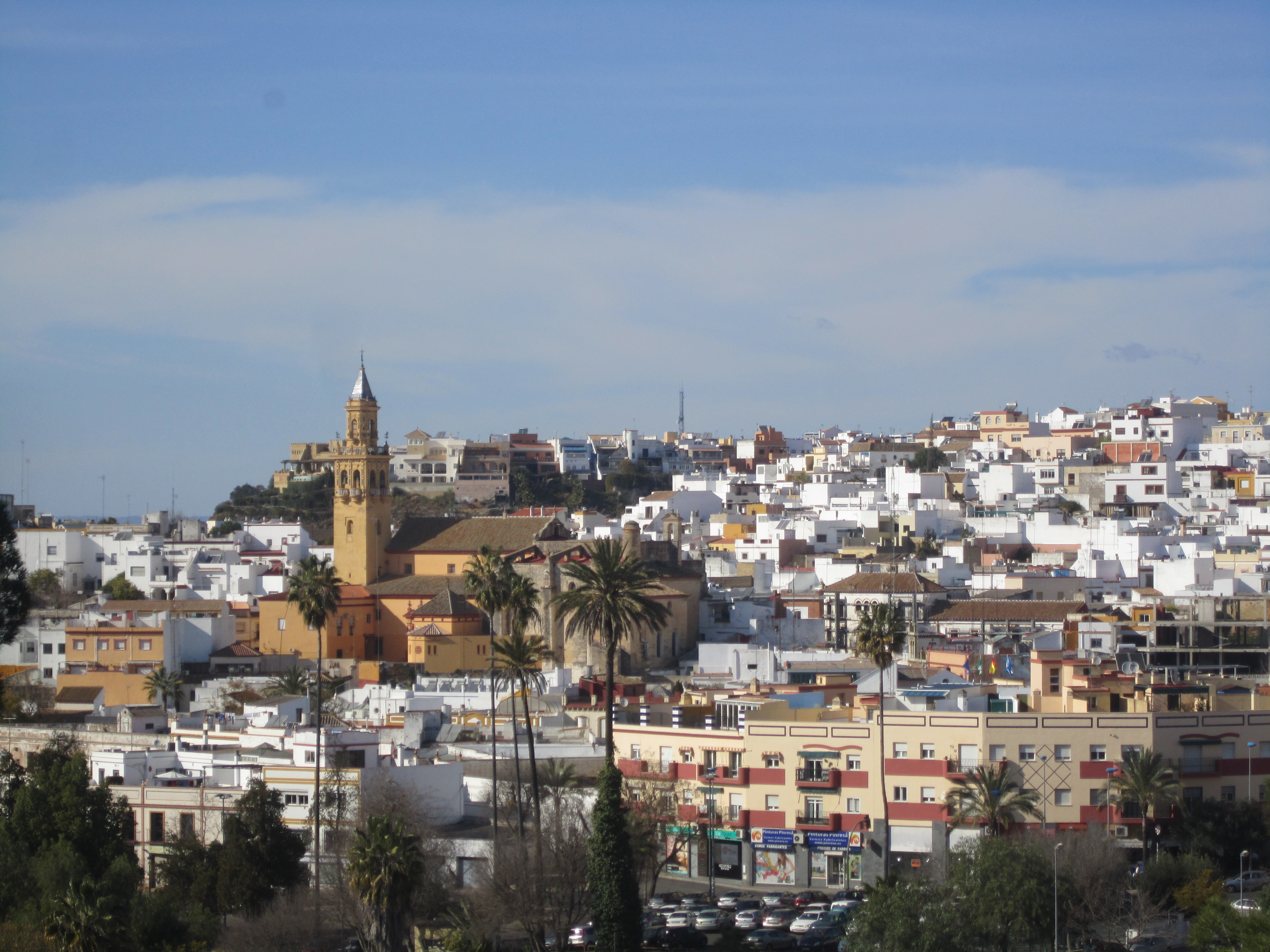
Alcalá de Guadaíra is the province of Seville's third largest municipality by population.

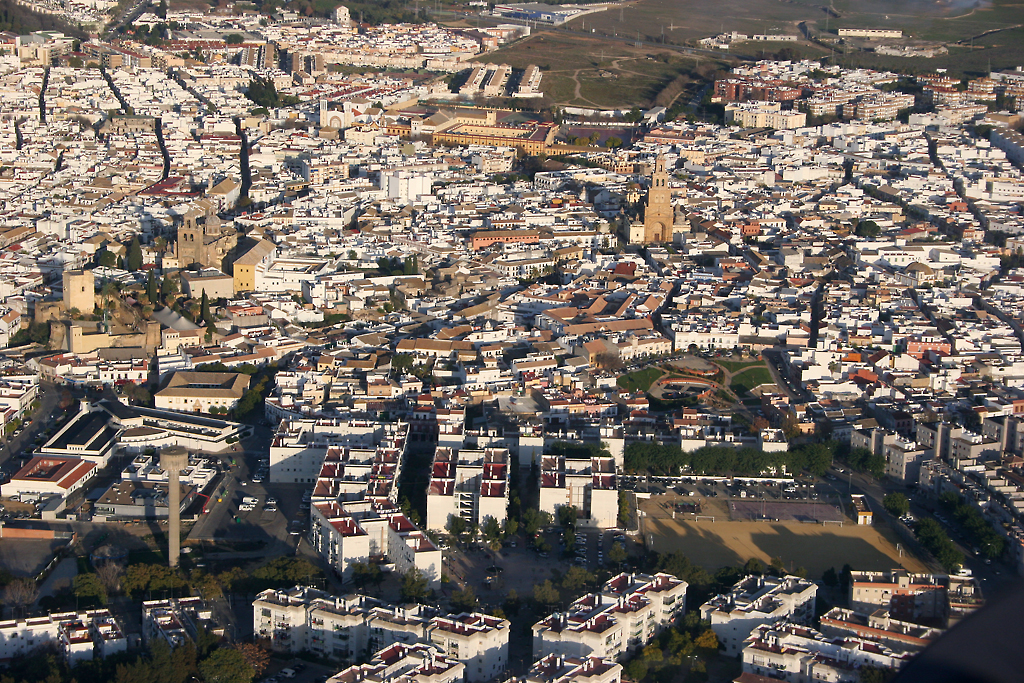
Utrera, the province of Seville's fourth largest municipality by population

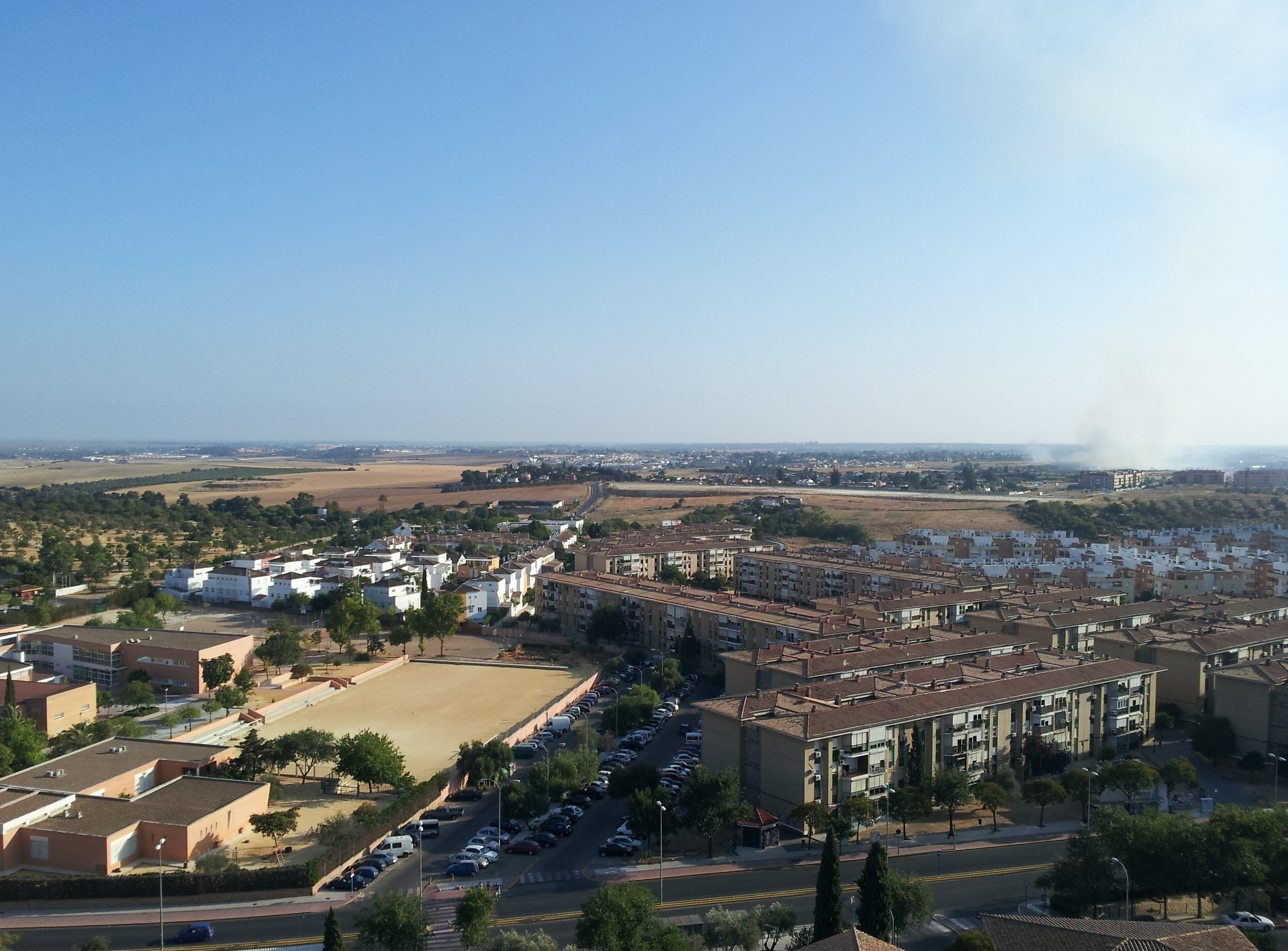
Mairena del Aljarafe, the fifth largest municipality by population in the province of Seville

† Provincial capital

Municipalities in the province of Seville
Name	Population (2024 census)	Population (2011 census)	Population change	Land area (km²)	Population density (2024)
Aguadulce	2,064	2,141	−3.6%	13.69	150.8/km^{2}
Alanís	1,669	1,859	−10.2%	281.11	5.9/km^{2}
Albaida del Aljarafe	3,227	2,995	+7.7%	10.92	295.5/km^{2}
Alcalá de Guadaíra	77,112	73,317	+5.2%	284.93	270.6/km^{2}
Alcalá del Río	12,293	11,484	+7.0%	82.57	148.9/km^{2}
Alcolea del Río	3,283	3,410	−3.7%	50.17	65.4/km^{2}
La Algaba	16,755	15,786	+6.1%	18.11	925.2/km^{2}
Algámitas	1,246	1,312	−5.0%	20.42	61.0/km^{2}
Almadén de la Plata	1,336	1,548	−13.7%	255.79	5.2/km^{2}
Almensilla	6,667	5,756	+15.8%	14.08	473.5/km^{2}
Arahal	19,437	19,490	−0.3%	200.86	96.8/km^{2}
Aznalcázar	4,923	4,234	+16.3%	449.62	10.9/km^{2}
Aznalcóllar	6,098	6,118	−0.3%	199.21	30.6/km^{2}
Badolatosa	3,076	3,204	−4.0%	47.79	64.4/km^{2}
Benacazón	7,383	6,962	+6.0%	32.15	229.6/km^{2}
Bollullos de la Mitación	11,255	9,709	+15.9%	62.56	179.9/km^{2}
Bormujos	22,983	20,200	+13.8%	12.32	1,865.5/km^{2}
Brenes	12,845	12,773	+0.6%	21.69	592.2/km^{2}
Burguillos	7,348	6,413	+14.6%	43.14	170.3/km^{2}
Las Cabezas de San Juan	16,400	16,598	−1.2%	229.70	71.4/km^{2}
Camas	28,737	26,433	+8.7%	11.59	2,479.5/km^{2}
La Campana	5,132	5,496	−6.6%	125.77	40.8/km^{2}
Cantillana	10,717	10,800	−0.8%	107.03	100.1/km^{2}
Cañada Rosal	3,418	3,270	+4.5%	25.83	132.3/km^{2}
Carmona	30,004	28,817	+4.1%	922.07	32.5/km^{2}
Carrión de los Céspedes	2,613	2,540	+2.9%	6.11	427.7/km^{2}
Casariche	5,303	5,627	−5.8%	52.90	100.2/km^{2}
Castilblanco de los Arroyos	5,171	5,080	+1.8%	323.55	16.0/km^{2}
Castilleja de Guzmán	2,873	2,810	+2.2%	2.04	1,408.3/km^{2}
Castilleja de la Cuesta	17,176	17,398	−1.3%	2.17	7,915.2/km^{2}
Castilleja del Campo	607	642	−5.5%	16.22	37.4/km^{2}
El Castillo de las Guardas	1,514	1,566	−3.3%	258.74	5.9/km^{2}
Cazalla de la Sierra	4,646	5,069	−8.3%	356.15	13.0/km^{2}
Constantina	5,736	6,400	−10.4%	481.32	11.9/km^{2}
Coria del Río	31,136	29,880	+4.2%	62.67	496.8/km^{2}
Coripe	1,198	1,396	−14.2%	51.45	23.3/km^{2}
El Coronil	4,691	5,024	−6.6%	91.67	51.2/km^{2}
Los Corrales	3,968	4,080	−2.7%	67.53	58.8/km^{2}
El Cuervo de Sevilla	8,711	8,694	+0.2%	30.44	286.2/km^{2}
Dos Hermanas	140,463	128,433	+9.4%	159.80	879.0/km^{2}
Écija	39,679	40,630	−2.3%	978.47	40.6/km^{2}
Espartinas	16,554	14,098	+17.4%	22.68	729.9/km^{2}
Estepa	12,410	12,685	−2.2%	189.97	65.3/km^{2}
Fuentes de Andalucía	7,254	7,299	−0.6%	150.52	48.2/km^{2}
El Garrobo	809	773	+4.7%	44.31	18.3/km^{2}
Gelves	10,491	9,450	+11.0%	8.06	1,301.6/km^{2}
Gerena	7,923	7,155	+10.7%	129.08	61.4/km^{2}
Gilena	3,668	3,918	−6.4%	50.97	72.0/km^{2}
Gines	13,558	13,254	+2.3%	2.92	4,643.2/km^{2}
Guadalcanal	2,523	2,883	−12.5%	274.97	9.2/km^{2}
Guillena	14,110	12,079	+16.8%	226.90	62.2/km^{2}
Herrera	6,573	6,488	+1.3%	53.48	122.9/km^{2}
Huévar del Aljarafe	3,364	2,702	+24.5%	57.53	58.5/km^{2}
Isla Mayor	5,785	5,919	−2.3%	114.38	50.6/km^{2}
Lantejuela	3,860	3,921	−1.6%	17.75	217.5/km^{2}
Lebrija	27,729	27,241	+1.8%	375.20	73.9/km^{2}
Lora de Estepa	891	872	+2.2%	18.09	49.3/km^{2}
Lora del Río	18,285	19,339	−5.5%	294.25	62.1/km^{2}
La Luisiana	4,631	4,648	−0.4%	42.97	107.8/km^{2}
El Madroño	305	322	−5.3%	102.92	3.0/km^{2}
Mairena del Alcor	24,288	21,895	+10.9%	69.92	347.4/km^{2}
Mairena del Aljarafe	47,906	42,570	+12.5%	17.50	2,737.5/km^{2}
Marchena	19,399	19,942	−2.7%	379.04	51.2/km^{2}
Marinaleda	2,570	2,783	−7.7%	24.82	103.5/km^{2}
Martín de la Jara	2,645	2,802	−5.6%	49.23	53.7/km^{2}
Los Molares	3,646	3,448	+5.7%	42.85	85.1/km^{2}
Montellano	7,039	7,153	−1.6%	116.83	60.2/km^{2}
Morón de la Frontera	27,218	28,389	−4.1%	431.94	63.0/km^{2}
Las Navas de la Concepción	1,521	1,713	−11.2%	63.35	24.0/km^{2}
Olivares	9,504	9,538	−0.4%	45.49	208.9/km^{2}
Osuna	17,364	17,958	−3.3%	592.24	29.3/km^{2}
Los Palacios y Villafranca	38,764	37,720	+2.8%	109.47	354.1/km^{2}
El Palmar de Troya	2,306	No data (Note: El Palmar de Troya was partitioned from Utrera and became an independent municipality in 2018 and is thus not included in the 2011 census.)		33.02	69.8/km^{2}
Palomares del Río	9,276	7,666	+21.0%	13.10	708.1/km^{2}
Paradas	6,811	7,060	−3.5%	109.78	62.0/km^{2}
Pedrera	5,122	5,378	−4.8%	60.64	84.5/km^{2}
El Pedroso	2,075	2,193	−5.4%	314.11	6.6/km^{2}
Peñaflor	3,662	3,788	−3.3%	82.89	44.2/km^{2}
Pilas	14,147	13,720	+3.1%	45.93	308.0/km^{2}
Pruna	2,531	2,797	−9.5%	100.64	25.1/km^{2}
La Puebla de Cazalla	10,817	11,497	−5.9%	189.31	57.1/km^{2}
La Puebla de los Infantes	2,917	3,169	−8.0%	154.23	18.9/km^{2}
La Puebla del Río	11,860	12,242	−3.1%	374.65	31.7/km^{2}
El Real de la Jara	1,528	1,614	−5.3%	157.35	9.7/km^{2}
La Rinconada	40,332	37,436	+7.7%	138.46	291.3/km^{2}
La Roda de Andalucía	4,186	4,386	−4.6%	76.74	54.5/km^{2}
El Ronquillo	1,440	1,425	+1.1%	76.49	18.8/km^{2}
El Rubio	3,313	3,547	−6.6%	20.80	159.3/km^{2}
Salteras	5,602	5,380	+4.1%	57.45	97.5/km^{2}
San Juan de Aznalfarache	23,112	21,484	+7.6%	4.07	5,678.6/km^{2}
Sanlúcar la Mayor	14,366	13,207	+8.8%	136.16	105.5/km^{2}
San Nicolás del Puerto	599	631	−5.1%	44.94	13.3/km^{2}
Santiponce	8,649	8,398	+3.0%	8.35	1,035.8/km^{2}
El Saucejo	4,222	4,447	−5.1%	92.20	45.8/km^{2}
Seville†	686,741	698,042	−1.6%	142.00	4,836.2/km^{2}
Tocina	9,380	9,582	−2.1%	15.62	600.5/km^{2}
Tomares	25,595	23,938	+6.9%	5.22	4,903.3/km^{2}
Umbrete	9,395	8,377	+12.2%	12.42	756.4/km^{2}
Utrera	52,279	51,722	+1.1%	651.29	80.3/km^{2}
Valencina de la Concepción	8,085	8,052	+0.4%	25.09	322.2/km^{2}
Villamanrique de la Condesa	4,655	4,246	+9.6%	57.67	80.7/km^{2}
Villanueva del Ariscal	6,974	6,153	+13.3%	4.72	1,477.5/km^{2}
Villanueva del Río y Minas	5,057	5,170	−2.2%	150.71	33.6/km^{2}
Villanueva de San Juan	1,002	1,328	−24.5%	34.74	28.8/km^{2}
Villaverde del Río	7,790	7,561	+3.0%	41.14	189.4/km^{2}
El Viso del Alcor	19,318	18,952	+1.9%	20.22	955.4/km^{2}
Province of Seville	1,968,624	1,930,941	+2.0%	14,036.15	140.3/km^{2}
Andalusia	8,631,862	8,371,270	+3.1%	87,587.59	98.6/km^{2}
Spain	48,619,695	46,815,916	+3.9%	504,755.17	96.3/km^{2}

== See also ==
- Geography of Spain
- List of municipalities of Spain
