= Martín de la Jara =

Martín de la Jara, Spain
- city
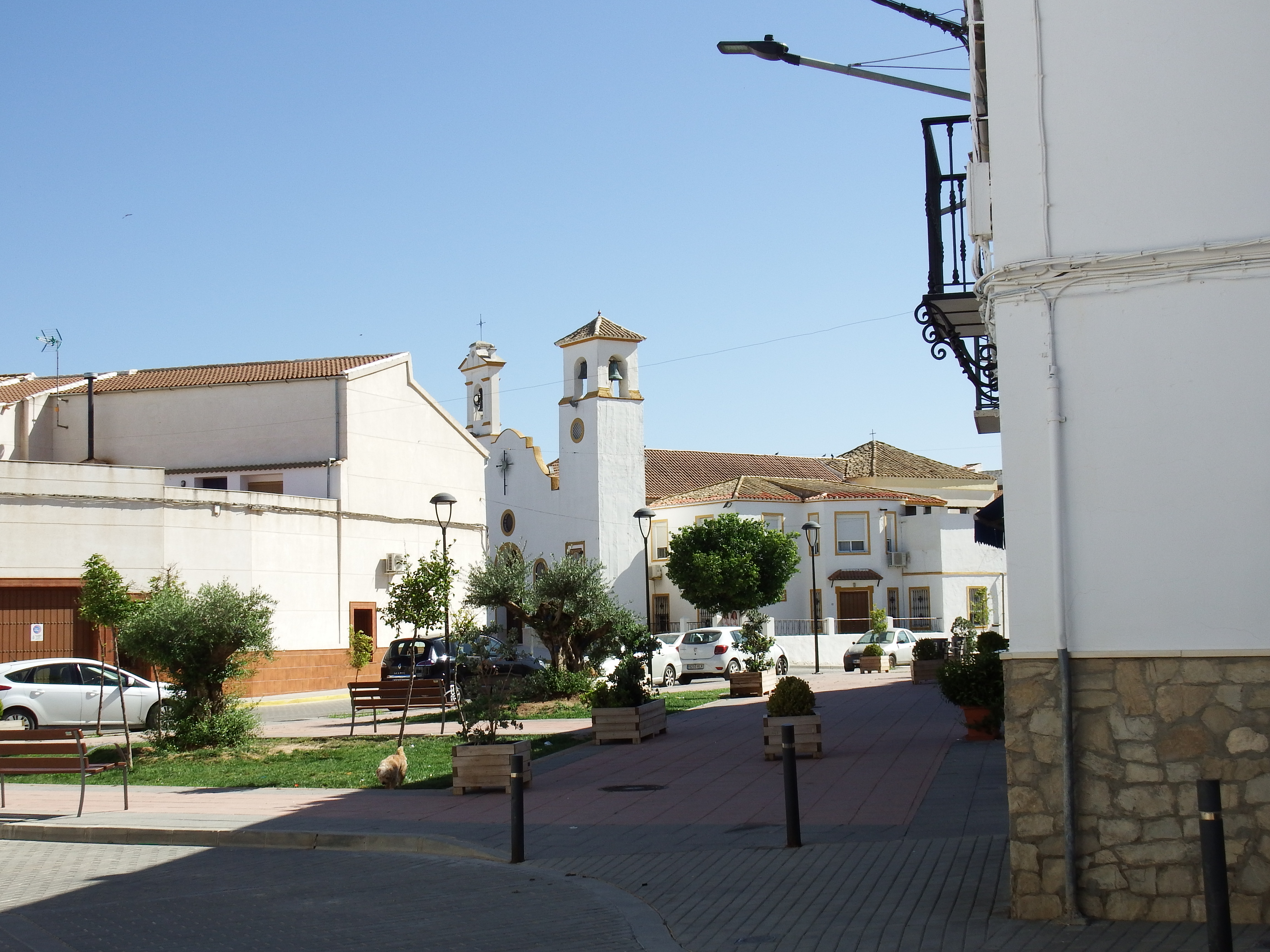

- Flag Coat of arms
- Interactive map of Martín de la Jara, Spain
- Coordinates: 37°06′N 4°57′W
- Country: Spain
- Province: Seville
- Municipality: Martín de la Jara

Area
  - Total: 50 km^{2} (19 sq mi)
- Elevation: 405 m (1,329 ft)

Population (2025-01-01)
  - Total: 2,627
  - Density: 53/km^{2} (140/sq mi)
- Time zone: UTC+1 (CET)
  - Summer (DST): UTC+2 (CEST)

Martín de la Jara is a city located in the province of Seville, Spain. According to the 2005 census (INE), the city has a population of 2,748.

== See also ==
- List of municipalities in Seville
