= Los Corrales =

- city
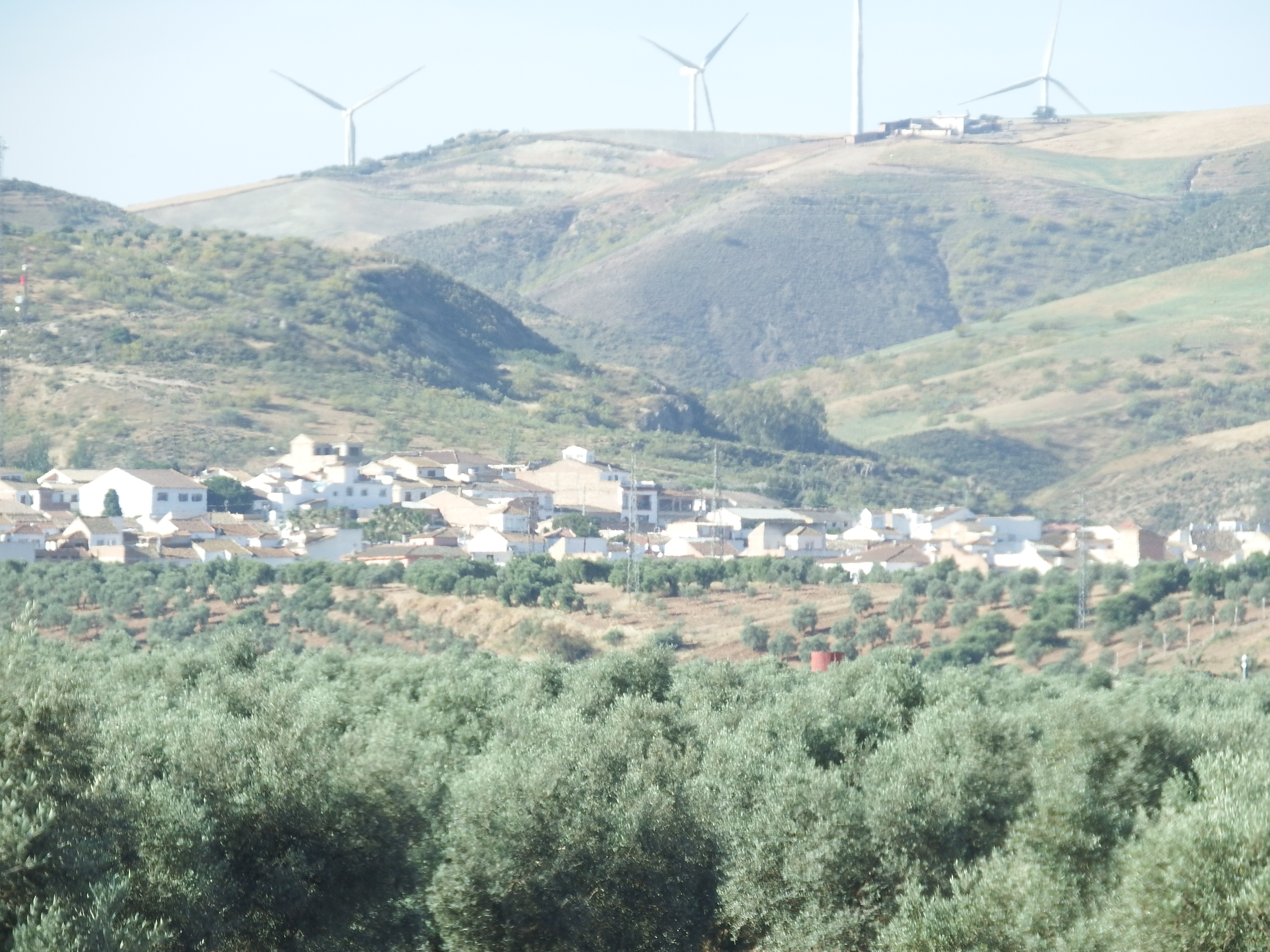

- Flag Coat of arms
- Interactive map of Los Corrales
- Coordinates: 37°06′N 4°59′W
- Country: Spain
- Province: Seville
- Municipality: Los Corrales

Area
  - Total: 66 km^{2} (25 sq mi)
- Elevation: 385 m (1,263 ft)

Population (2025-01-01)
  - Total: 4,021
  - Density: 61/km^{2} (160/sq mi)
- Time zone: UTC+1 (CET)
  - Summer (DST): UTC+2 (CEST)

Los Corrales is a city located in the province of Seville, Spain. According to the 2005 census (INE), the city has a population of 4,095 inhabitants.

== See also ==
- List of municipalities in Seville
