= Gelves =

- city
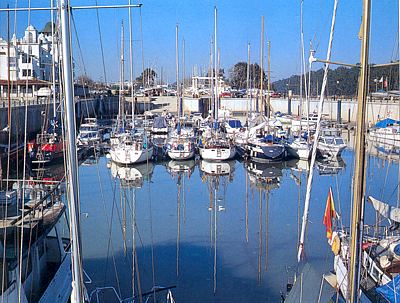
- Gelves Marina, Seville, Spain

- Flag Coat of arms
- Interactive map of Gelves
- Coordinates: 37°20′N 6°01′W
- Country: Spain
- Autonomous community: Andalusia
- Province: Seville

Area
  - Total: 8 km^{2} (3.1 sq mi)
- Elevation: 26 m (85 ft)

Population (2025-01-01)
  - Total: 10,548
  - Density: 1,300/km^{2} (3,400/sq mi)
- Time zone: UTC+1 (CET)
  - Summer (DST): UTC+2 (CEST)

Gelves is a city located in the province of Seville, in Andalusia, Spain. According to the 2006 census (INE), the city has a population of 8,325 inhabitants. It lies on the west bank of the Guadalquivir river.

The city of Gelves is not to be confused with Los Gelves, the Spanish name for the island of Djerba off the coast of Tunisia, where the Spanish fought important battles in 1510 and 1520.

Gelves is in the metropolitan agglomeration of the regional capital, Seville, but is a separate municipality, bordering to the north with San Juan de Aznalfarache, west with Mairena del Aljarafe and southwest with Palomares del Río, which are also in the conurbation. Gelves also borders the municipality of the city of Dos Hermanas to the southwest. Across the river, Gelves faces the Sevillian district of Los Remedios on the Isla de La Cartuja.

== See also ==
- List of municipalities in Seville
