= Lower March =

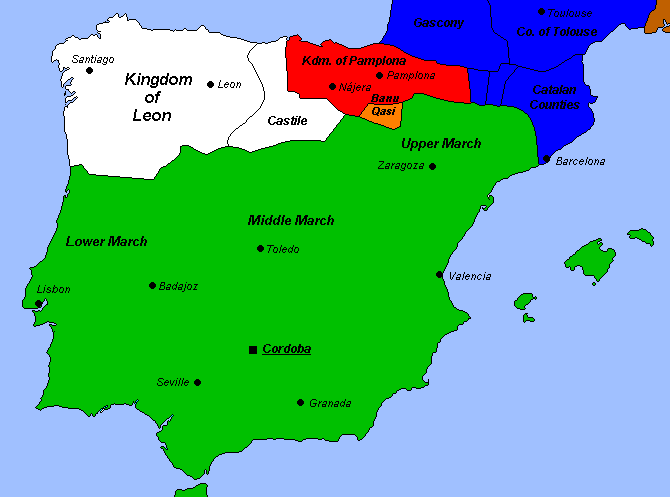
Al-Thagr al-Adna (Lower March) was in the western portion of the overall Caliphate of Córdoba (area in green) in the early 10th century.

The Lower March (Arabic: الثغر الأدنى, al-Thaghr al-Adnā; Portuguese: Marca Inferior) was a march of al-Andalus. It included territory that is now in Portugal.

As a borderland territory, it was home to the so-called muwalladun or indigenous converts and their descendants, some of whom eventually established dynastic lordships. This was the case of Ibn Marwan al-Jilliqi who ruled the Cora of Mérida during the early part of the ninth century, a region with its capital in modern Mérida, including the area of modern Badajoz. Several rebellions occurred in the territory, most notably caused by Umar ibn Hafsun and two of his sons refusing to recognize the Emir of Cordoba's sovereignty; even after Ibn Hafsun's death, small pockets of independent resistance persisted. It was not until a decade after Ibn Hafsun’s demise that the Emir of Cordoba was able to completely quell the rebellion in the Lower March.

In the reign of ʿAbd al-Raḥmān III (912–961), the Lower March was combined with the Central March to form an enlarged march with its capital at Medinaceli in the former Central March. It retained the name of the Lower March.

== See also ==
- Portugal in the Middle Ages
- Portugal in the Reconquista
- Taifa of Badajoz
