= El Madroño =

El Madroño, Spain
- municipality
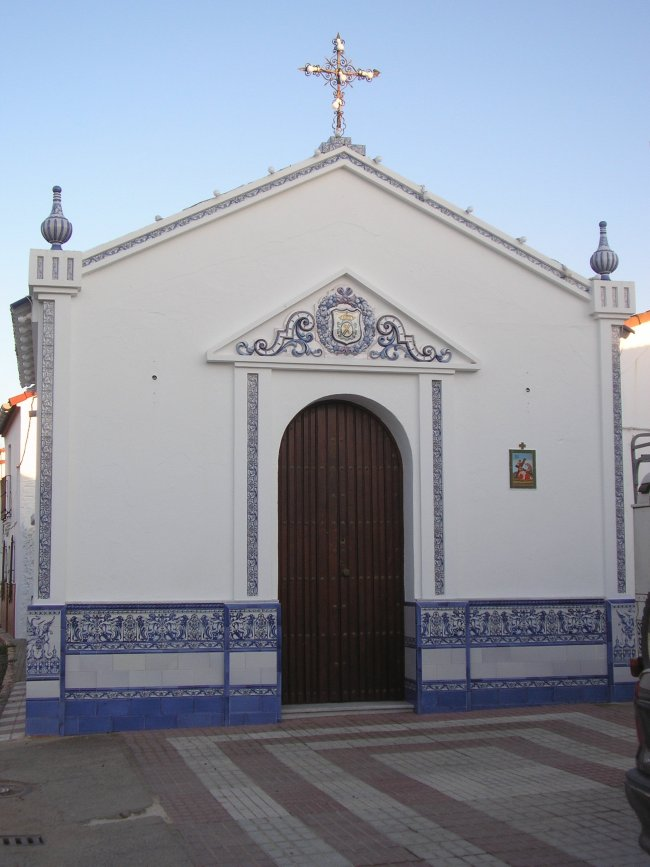

- Coat of arms
- Interactive map of El Madroño, Spain
- Coordinates: 37°38′43″N 6°30′37″W
- Country: Spain
- Province: Seville
- Municipality: El Madroño

Area
  - Total: 103 km^{2} (40 sq mi)
- Elevation: 350 m (1,150 ft)

Population (2025-01-01)
  - Total: 286
  - Density: 2.78/km^{2} (7.19/sq mi)
- Time zone: UTC+1 (CET)
  - Summer (DST): UTC+2 (CEST)

El Madroño is a municipality located in the province of Seville, Spain. According to the 2005 census (INE), the town has a population of 367 inhabitants.

== See also ==
- List of municipalities in Seville
