= Castilblanco de los Arroyos =

- city
- Coat of arms

- Location within Province of Seville Location within Andalusia Location within Spain
- Coordinates: 37°40′30″N 5°59′20″W
- Country: Spain
- Region: Andalusia
- Province: Seville
- Municipality: Castilblanco de los Arroyos

Area
  - Total: 325 km^{2} (125 sq mi)
- Elevation: 313 m (1,027 ft)

Population (2025-01-01)
  - Total: 5,145
  - Density: 15.8/km^{2} (41.0/sq mi)
- Time zone: UTC+1 (CET)
  - Summer (DST): UTC+2 (CEST)

Castilblanco de los Arroyos is a city located in the province of Seville, Spain. According to the 2006 census (INE), the city has a population of 4870 inhabitants.

== See also ==
- List of municipalities in Seville
