= Gilena =

Gilena, Spain
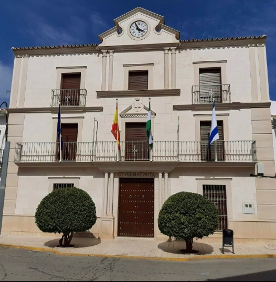
- Town hall of Gilena

- Flag Coat of arms
- Interactive map of Gilena, Spain
- Country: Spain
- Province: Seville
- Municipality: Gilena

Area
  - Total: 52 km^{2} (20 sq mi)
- Elevation: 465 m (1,526 ft)

Population (2025-01-01)
  - Total: 3,647
  - Density: 70/km^{2} (180/sq mi)
- Time zone: UTC+1 (CET)
  - Summer (DST): UTC+2 (CEST)

Gilena is a city located in the province of Seville, Spain. As of 2025, the city has a population of 3,647 inhabitants.

== Historic events in Gilena ==
In 1931, Gilena had over four thousand inhabitants and almost all of them worked in the agriculture. The work conditions were very hard; therefore the life standards were very difficult. The workers did not earn much money; they were unemployed most of the days. The poverty and even the famine were present in most of the Gilena families.

On 12 April 1931 the local elections were celebrated in Spain. It was the first time for nearly sixty years that a free election had been allowed in Spain. The republican parties and left-wing parties won the elections in the cities. The Alfonso XIII's, monarchy and Primo de Rivera's dictatorship –before- were both a failure. Spanish people wanted a change in the government which could sort out their problems. On 14 April the Second Spanish Republic was announced; most Spaniards thought that their life would improve.

The historians have always said that the change was required in the cities; the rural areas did not have freedom to choose their representatives because the “caciques” (or local political bosses) controlled the whole system. For example, in Gilena there was not any election; the law of 1907 allowed that the election was not needed if the number the vacancies were equal to the number of candidates. But the news told us that in Gilena, before the election, the socialists already were well organized; however, the system did not allow them to take part in the aforementioned election. On the other hand, on 14 April all of them went out to the streets to demonstrate their support to the Republic.

During the Republic, in Spain, there were a lot of parties, however in Gilena there were only two: PSOE, the left-wing party, and IR, the centre party. Actually, this party, IR, was led by a landowner, a farmer “cacique”. The workers could choose either of them, but if you chose the Socialist Party, you did not work. The two parties had union headquarters in the same street. This location caused many tensions.

On 9 October a committee, composed by public authorities, went to Seville to ask the civil governor for help. The same day, the socialist workers summoned a general strike to push in the meeting. In the dawn, the pickets went out to the fields to verify that anybody was working.

The most complicated situation was given in the farmhouse called “Marqués”, the most important finca in the whole area, only 3 kilometres away from Gilena; its lands are included between Gilena and Aguadulce. Some pickets tried to convince the workers that they gave up their works, but they did not stop and they began to insult each other.

The pickets returned to the union headquarters to ask for help. Meanwhile, from the farmhouse Marqués, they called the Aguadulce civil guards. When a hundred of workers returned, they found the civil guards aimed their guns at them. They were registered and led back to Gilena, to the civil guard's barracks. In the search, they did not find firearms. On the contrary, sticks, stones and other objects were found.

The civil guard corporal, who did not know Gilena, led the prisoners' row to the town centre, which was a mistake. Along the way, others civil guards, who were patrolling the streets, joined up to a total of 10. When they came to the village, many people were gathering. The tension was growing.

When the prisoners' chains passed in front of the socialist headquarters, the shouts grew. Then, several workers surrounded the corporal, took his gun off and put it into their headquarters.

At that moment, when the other civil guards saw the corporal fallen on the floor, they began to shoot. Everybody run and hid everywhere. Many people hid away in the union headquarters; inside, some of them climbed up the courtyards wall to the next houses. Some hours later, the reinforcements of civil guards came from Osuna and Estepa.

The corporal Pablo Garcia Albano and five workers died, one of them in the hospital in Seville. Many people were injured, sixty were arrested and many people remained inside their houses. The politics and military authorities visited the village; the journalists wrote about the events in their newspapers. For most of the papers, the victim was the corporal.

Years later, the judgment was celebrated. The murderer was not identified and only three workers were found guilty by insults to the authorities. The legend told that a worker stuck a needle in the corporal's stomach, but the reality was that his head was shattered and the gun, stolen by the workers, was not ever shot.

== See also ==
- List of municipalities in Seville
