= Tocina =

Tocina, Spain
- city
- Flag Coat of arms
- Interactive map of Tocina, Spain
- Coordinates: 37°36′N 5°44′W
- Country: Spain
- Province: Seville
- Municipality: Tocina

Area
  - Total: 14 km^{2} (5.4 sq mi)
- Elevation: 27 m (89 ft)

Population (2025-01-01)
  - Total: 9,431
  - Density: 670/km^{2} (1,700/sq mi)
- Time zone: UTC+1 (CET)
  - Summer (DST): UTC+2 (CEST)

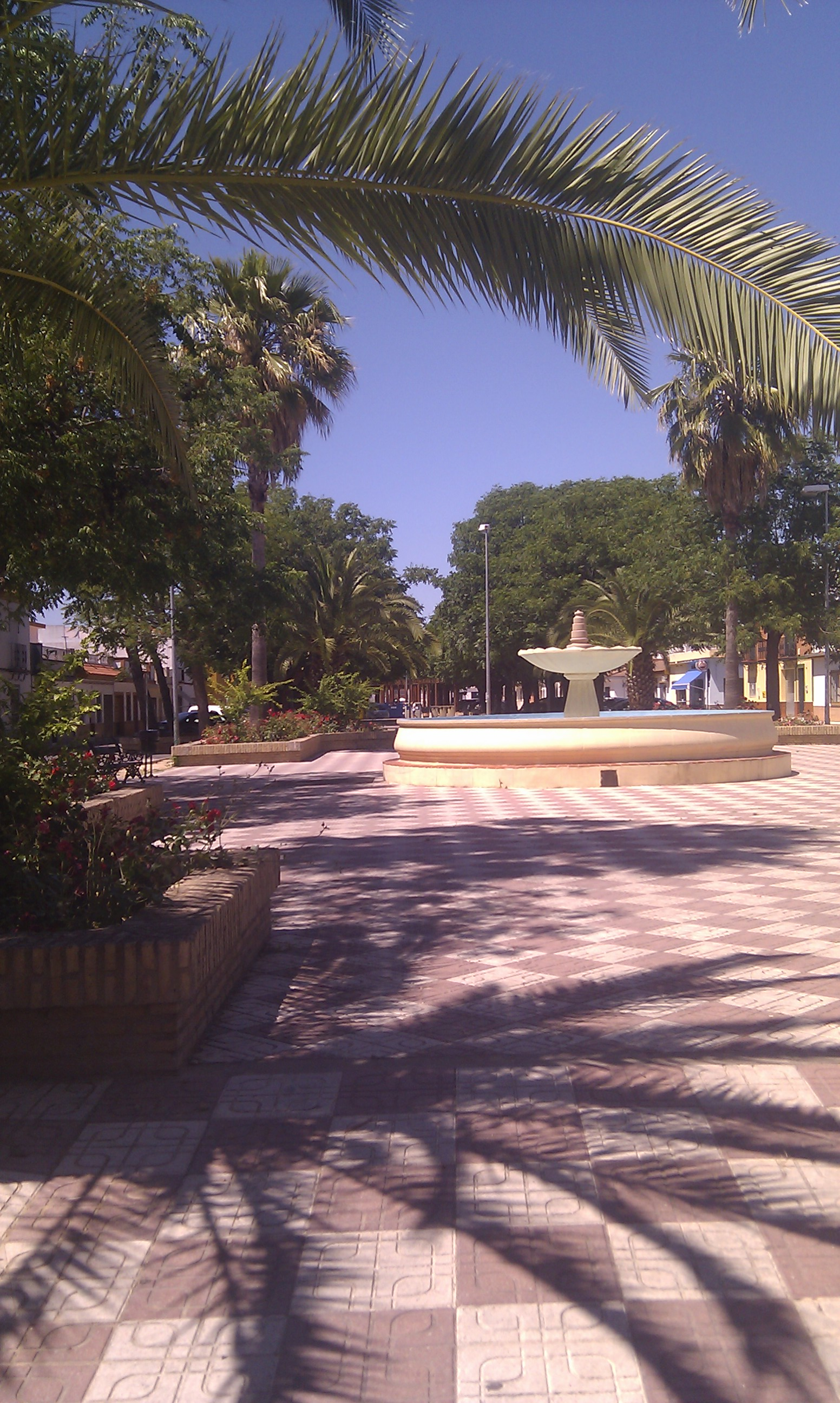
Well-known square in Reina Sofía street, Tocina

Tocina is a city located in the province of Seville, Spain. According to the 2005 census (INE), the city has a population of 9114 inhabitants. Its name in Moorish times was Tushēna (Arabic: طُشَانَة).

Tocina is twin city with Żejtun in Malta.

== See also ==
- List of municipalities in Seville
