= Las Navas de la Concepción =

- village
- Flag Coat of arms

- Location within Spain
- Coordinates: 37°56′N 5°27′W
- Country: Spain
- Province: Seville

Area
  - Total: 63 km^{2} (24 sq mi)
- Elevation: 436 m (1,430 ft)

Population (2025-01-01)
  - Total: 1,501
  - Density: 24/km^{2} (62/sq mi)
- Time zone: UTC+1 (CET)
  - Summer (DST): UTC+2 (CEST)

Las Navas de la Concepción is a village located in the province of Seville, Spain. According to the 2005 census (INE), the city has a population of 1831 inhabitants.

== See also ==
- List of municipalities in Seville
