= Coripe =

Coripe, Spain
- city
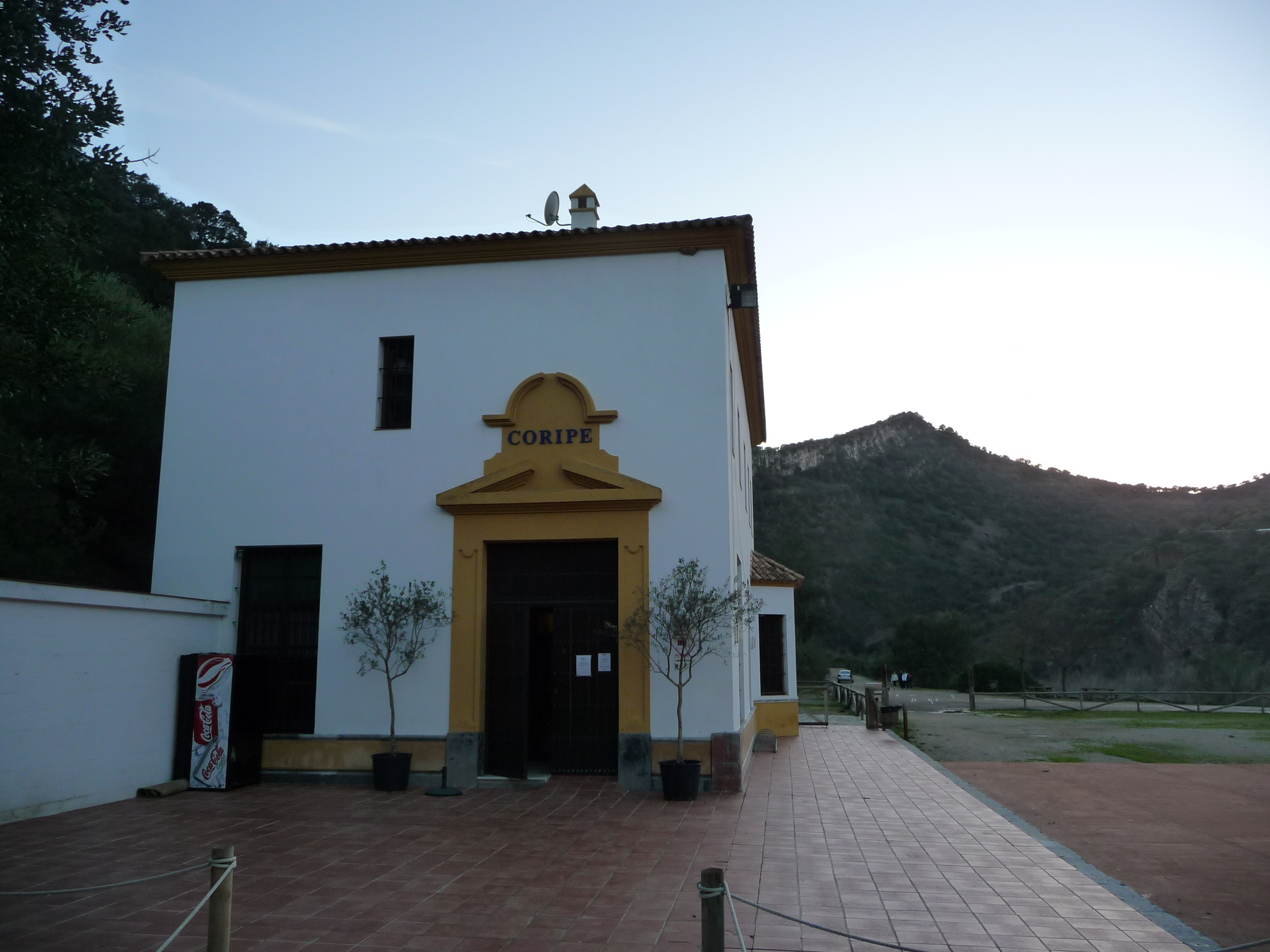

- Flag Coat of arms
- Interactive map of Coripe, Spain
- Coordinates: 36°58′N 5°26′W
- Country: Spain
- Province: Seville
- Municipality: Coripe

Area
  - Total: 52 km^{2} (20 sq mi)
- Elevation: 325 m (1,066 ft)

Population (2025-01-01)
  - Total: 1,218
  - Density: 23/km^{2} (61/sq mi)
- Time zone: UTC+1 (CET)
  - Summer (DST): UTC+2 (CEST)

Coripe is a city located in the province of Seville, Spain. According to the 2006 census (INE), the city has a population of 1,436.

== Demography ==
Historical population
Year	2004	2007	2010	2013
Pop.	1,424	1,446	1,446	1,359
±%	—	+1.5%	+0.0%	−6.0%
Source: INE-es

== Culture ==
The village is known for the local Quema de Judas (Burning of Judas in English) holiday taking place on Sunday of Resurrection. Every year, the town denizens parade, shoot and burn a rag doll representing a figure deemed "despicable" by the locals.

Past examples include convicted and incarcerated embezzlers Rodrigo Rato and Iñaki Urdangarín, celebrities romantically linked to the Royal House such as Bárbara Rey and Eva Sannum, and murderers such as Ana Julia Quezada or Miguel Carcaño.

The April 2019 Judas burning ritual featured a dummy representing former Catalan President Carles Puigdemont; this choice, in the current volatile political climate and in the wake of the 2017–18 Spanish constitutional crisis, brought the town to the spotlight in a highly controversial manner. This controversy compounded earlier ones, particularly after complaints from several organizations such as Movimiento contra la Intolerancia (Movement against Intolerance) which claimed that these holidays could be considered as "hate crimes".

== See also ==
- List of municipalities in Seville
