= Montellano =

- city
- Flag Coat of arms
- Interactive map of Montellano
- Coordinates: 36°59′N 5°34′W
- Country: Spain
- Province: Seville
- Municipality: Montellano

Area
  - Total: 117 km^{2} (45 sq mi)
- Elevation: 250 m (820 ft)

Population (2025-01-01)
  - Total: 7,032
  - Density: 60.1/km^{2} (156/sq mi)
- Time zone: UTC+1 (CET)
  - Summer (DST): UTC+2 (CEST)

Montellano is a city located in the province of Seville, Spain. According to the 2011 census (INE), the city has a population of 7,179 inhabitants.

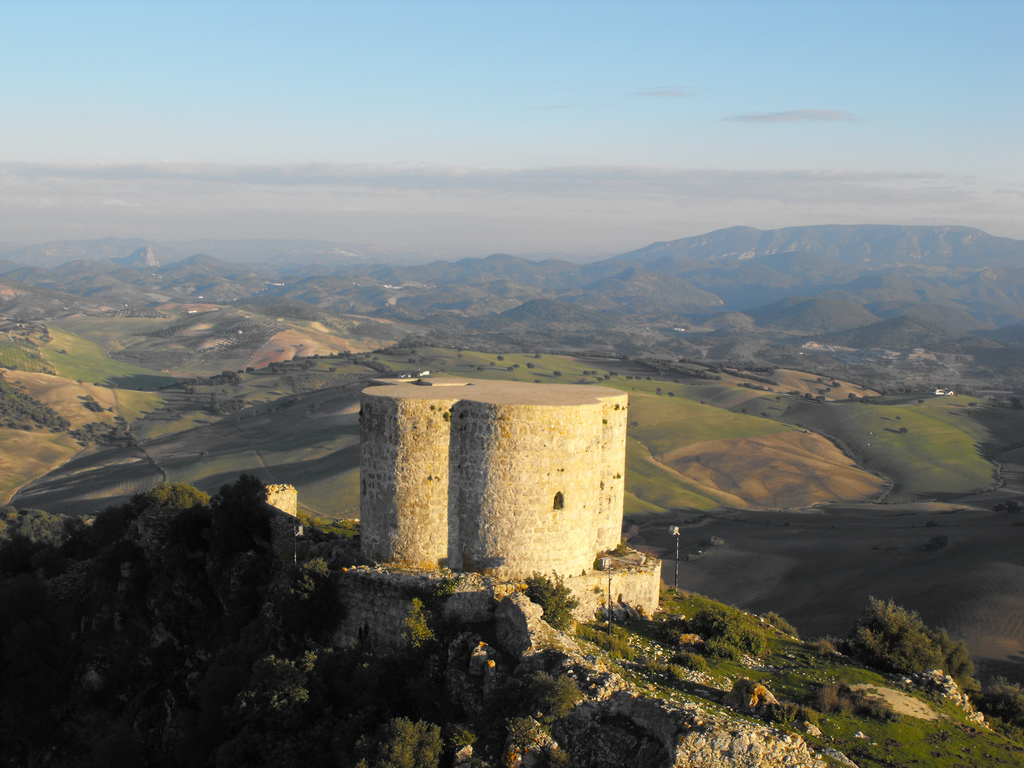
The Castle at Montellano

== See also ==
- List of municipalities in Seville
