= Paradas, Spain =

Coordinates: 37°17′25″N 5°29′48″W

Paradas
- Coat of arms

- Location in Spain.
- Country: Spain
- Autonomous community: Andalusia

Area
  - Total: 109.43 km^{2} (42.25 sq mi)
- Elevation: 123 m (404 ft)

Population (2025-01-01)
  - Total: 6,762
  - Density: 61.79/km^{2} (160.0/sq mi)
- Time zone: UTC+1 (CET)
  - Summer (DST): UTC+2 (CEST)
- Website: www.paradas.es

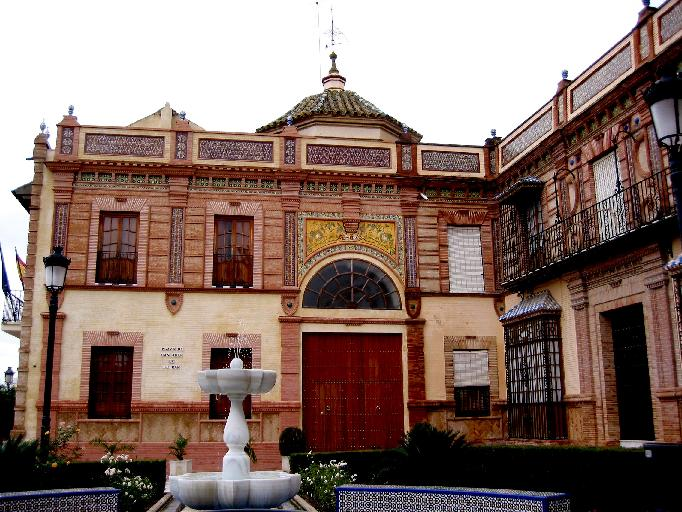
Place of Saint John Lateran, Paradas, Seville

Paradas is a municipality in the province of Seville, Spain.

== See also ==
- List of municipalities in Seville
