= Castilleja de Guzmán =

Castilleja de Guzmán, Spain
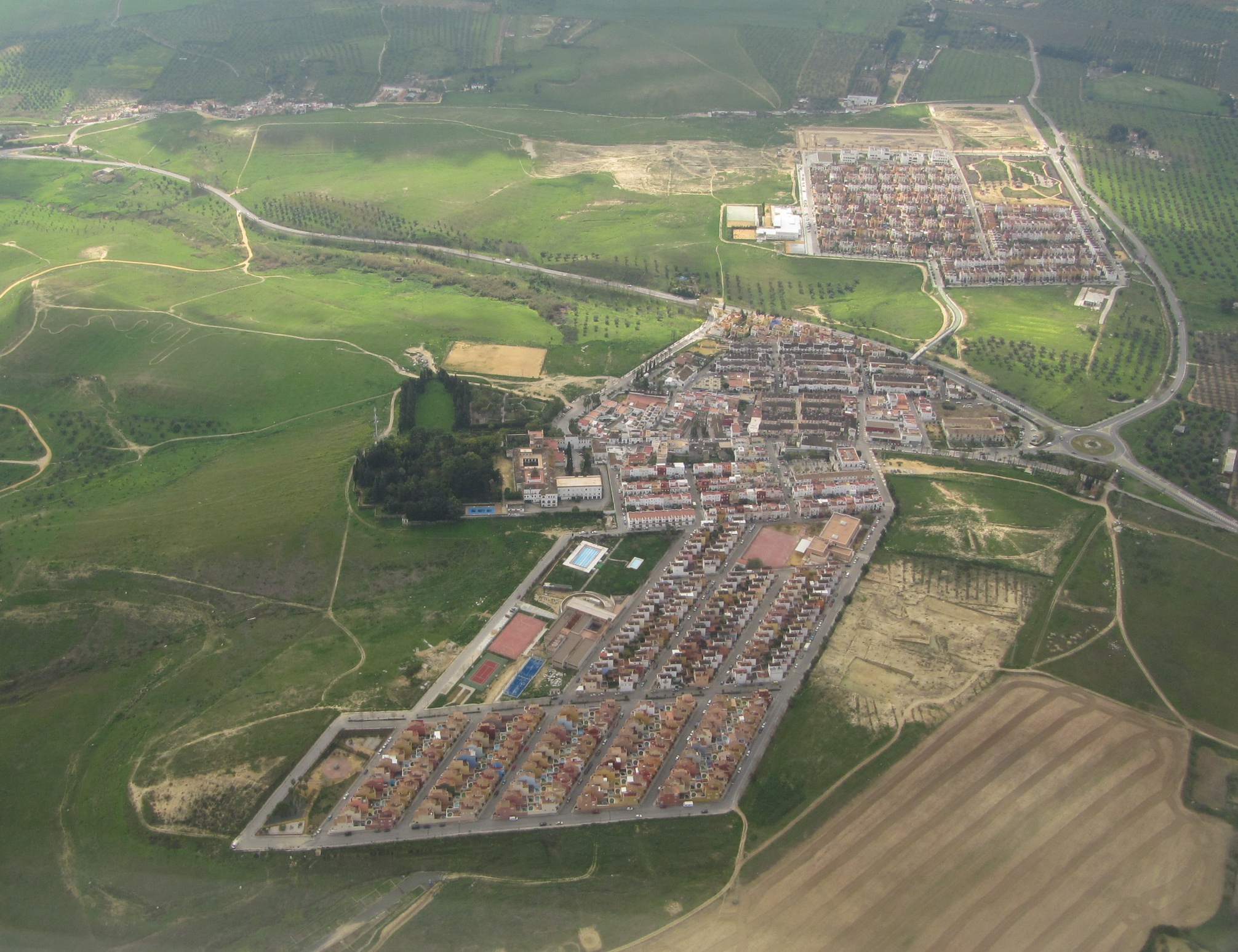

- Flag Coat of arms
- Interactive map of Castilleja de Guzmán, Spain
- Coordinates: 37°24′32″N 6°3′27″W
- Country: Spain
- Province: Seville
- Municipality: Castilleja de Guzmán

Area
  - Total: 2 km^{2} (0.77 sq mi)
- Elevation: 131 m (430 ft)

Population (2025-01-01)
  - Total: 2,843
  - Density: 1,400/km^{2} (3,700/sq mi)
- Time zone: UTC+1 (CET)
  - Summer (DST): UTC+2 (CEST)

Castilleja de Guzmán is a city located in the province of Seville, Spain. According to the 2005 census (INE), the city has a population of 2409 inhabitants.

== See also ==
- List of municipalities in Seville
