= Almensilla =

Coordinates: 37°19′N 6°07′W

- Flag Coat of arms

- Location in Spain.
- Country: Spain
- Autonomous community: Andalusia

Area
  - Total: 14.31 km^{2} (5.53 sq mi)
- Elevation: 45 m (148 ft)

Population (2025-01-01)
  - Total: 6,646
  - Density: 464.4/km^{2} (1,203/sq mi)
- Time zone: UTC+1 (CET)
  - Summer (DST): UTC+2 (CEST)
- Website: www.almensilla.es

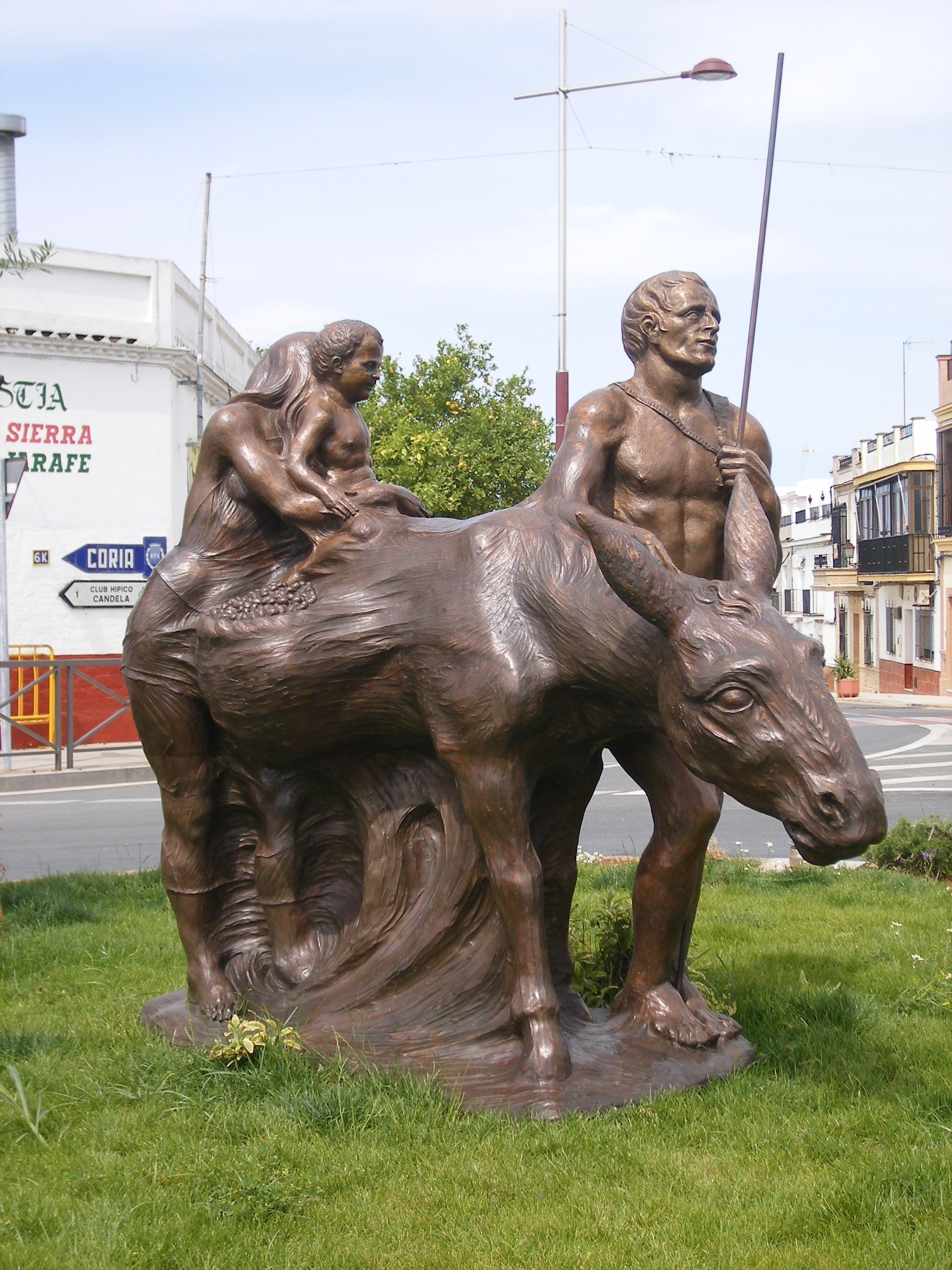
Bronze work sculpture in Almensilla, Seville, Spain

Almensilla is a municipality in Seville, Spain. In 2005 it had a population of 4,534. It has an area of 14 km^{2} and a population density of 324. It is at an altitude of 45 meters and is located 15 kilometers from Seville.

In 2010 the municipality of Almensilla held the highest debt of all municipalities in Spain, reaching more than 800% of the declared yearly income.

== See also ==
- List of municipalities in Seville
