= Peñaflor, Spain =

Coordinates: 37°42′N 5°20′W

Peñaflor
- Coat of arms

- Location in Spain.
- Country: Spain
- Autonomous community: Andalusia

Area
  - Land: 82.89 km^{2} (32.00 sq mi)
- Elevation: 52 m (171 ft)

Population (2025-01-01)
  - Total: 3,628
  - Density: 43.77/km^{2} (113.4/sq mi)
- Time zone: UTC+1 (CET)
  - Summer (DST): UTC+2 (CEST)
- Website: www.penaflor.es

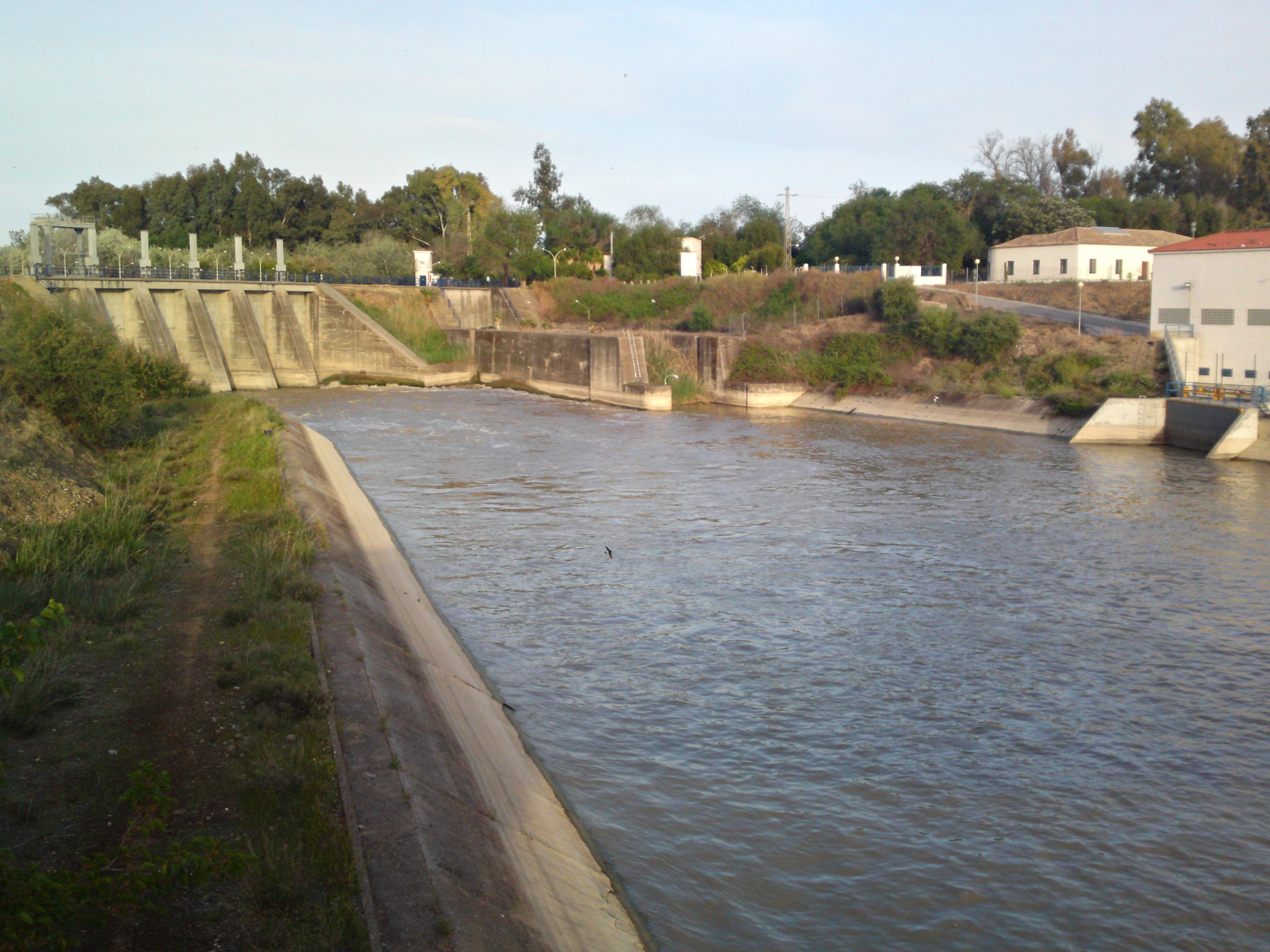
Peñaflor, Spain

Peñaflor is a municipality in the province of Seville, Spain.

== See also ==
- List of municipalities in Seville
