= Castilleja del Campo =

- city
- Flag Coat of arms
- Interactive map of Castilleja del Campo
- Coordinates: 37°23′N 6°20′W
- Country: Spain
- Province: Seville
- Municipality: Castilleja del Campo

Area
  - Total: 16 km^{2} (6.2 sq mi)
- Elevation: 121 m (397 ft)

Population (2025-01-01)
  - Total: 611
  - Density: 38/km^{2} (99/sq mi)
- Time zone: UTC+1 (CET)
  - Summer (DST): UTC+2 (CEST)

Castilleja del Campo is a city located in the province of Seville, Spain. According to the 2006 census (INE), the city has a population of 651 inhabitants.

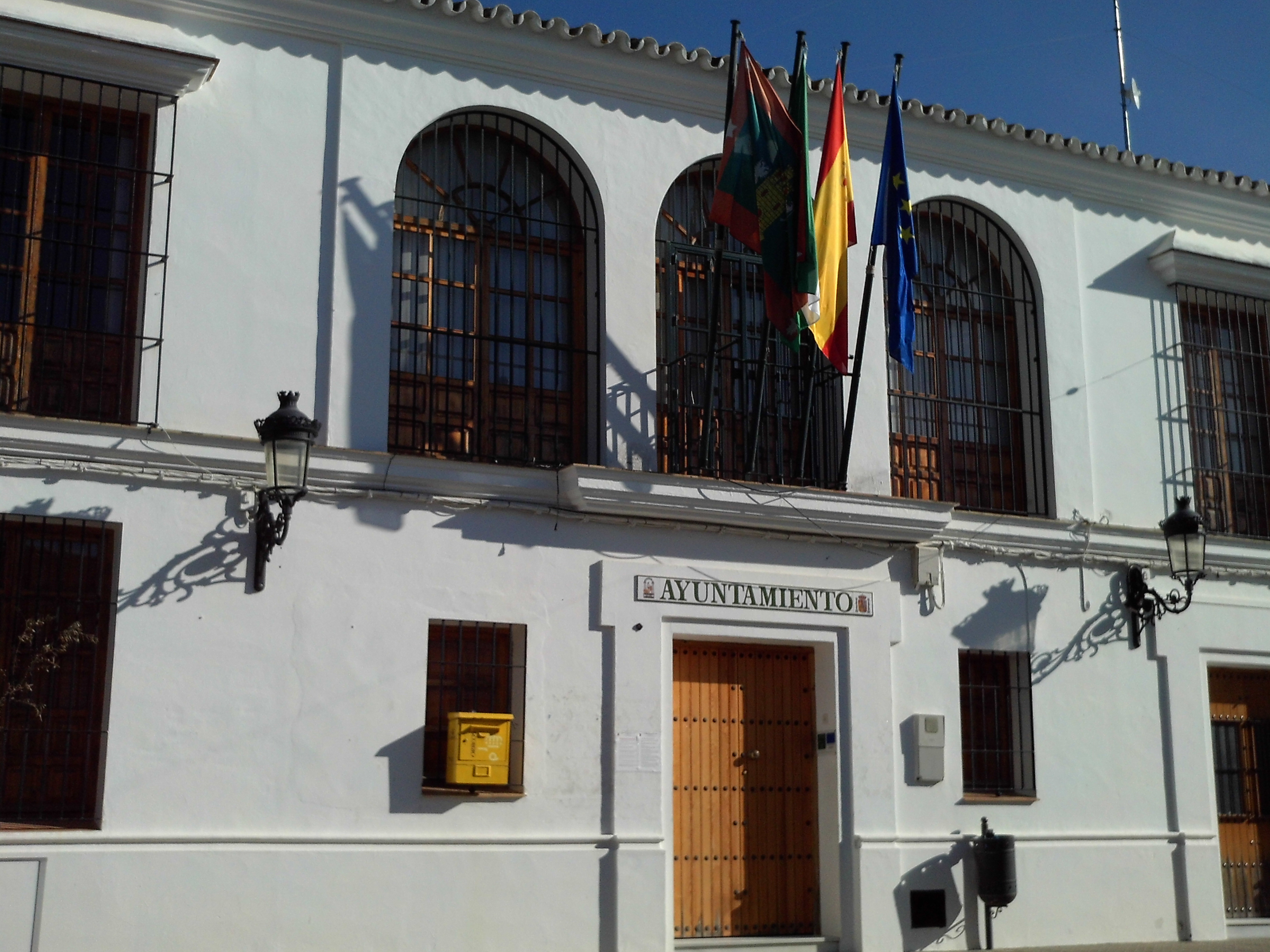
Town Hall of Castilleja del Campo

== See also ==
- List of municipalities in Seville
