= Carrión de los Céspedes =

Carrión de los Céspedes, Spain
- city
- Flag Coat of arms
- Interactive map of Carrión de los Céspedes, Spain
- Coordinates: 37°22′N 6°19′W
- Country: Spain
- Province: Seville
- Municipality: Carrión de los Céspedes

Government
  - Mayor: Consuelo Reinoso

Area
  - Total: 6 km^{2} (2.3 sq mi)
- Elevation: 88 m (289 ft)

Population (2025-01-01)
  - Total: 2,647
  - Density: 440/km^{2} (1,100/sq mi)
- Time zone: UTC+1 (CET)
  - Summer (DST): UTC+2 (CEST)
- Website: Official website

Carrión de los Céspedes is a town located in the province of Seville, Spain.

== See also ==
- List of municipalities in Seville
