= Bollullos de la Mitación =

Bollullos de la Mitación, Spain
- Town
- Coat of arms
- Interactive map of Bollullos de la Mitación, Spain
- Country: Spain
- Province: Seville
- Municipality: Bollullos de la Mitación

Area
  - Total: 63 km^{2} (24 sq mi)
- Elevation: 86 m (282 ft)

Population (2025-01-01)
  - Total: 11,431
  - Density: 180/km^{2} (470/sq mi)
- Time zone: UTC+1 (CET)
  - Summer (DST): UTC+2 (CEST)

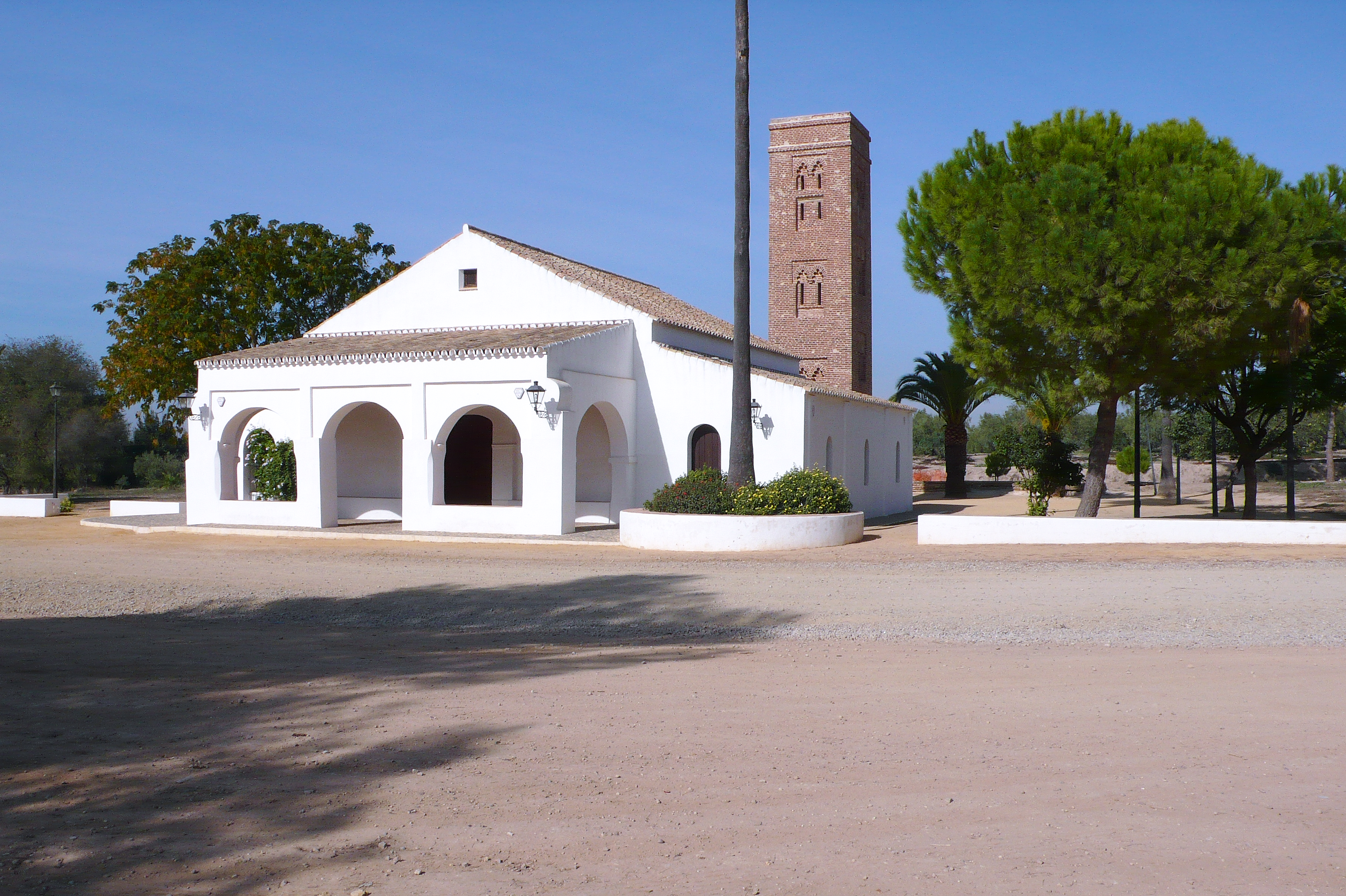
Bollullos de la Mitación

Bollullos de la Mitación (Spanish pronunciation: [boˈʎuʎos ðe la mitaˈθjon]) is a town located in the province of Seville, Spain. According to the 2006 census by the (Instituto Nacional de Estadística), the city has a population of 7084 inhabitants.

== See also ==
- List of municipalities in Seville
