= Palomares del Río =

Palomares del Río, Spain
- city
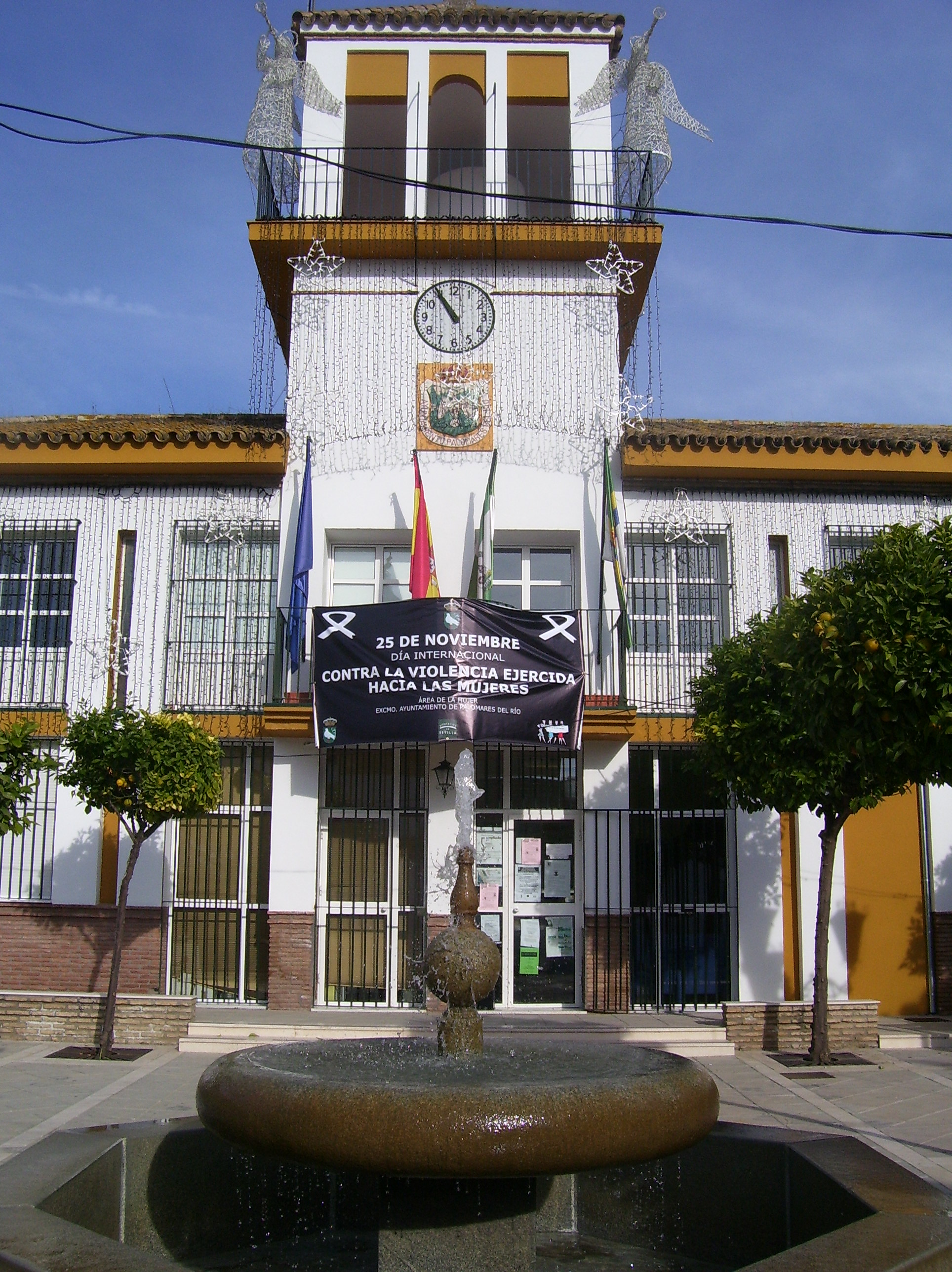
- Town hall of Palomares del Río

- Flag Coat of arms
- Interactive map of Palomares del Río, Spain
- Coordinates: 37°19′N 6°03′W
- Country: Spain
- Province: Seville
- Municipality: Palomares del Río

Area
  - Total: 13 km^{2} (5.0 sq mi)
- Elevation: 37 m (121 ft)

Population (2025-01-01)
  - Total: 9,421
  - Density: 720/km^{2} (1,900/sq mi)
- Time zone: UTC+1 (CET)
  - Summer (DST): UTC+2 (CEST)

Palomares del Río is a city located in the province of Seville, Spain. According to the 2021 census (INE), the city has a population of 9,020 inhabitants.

== See also ==
- List of municipalities in Seville
