= Bajo Guadalquivir =

Coordinates: 36°45′06″N 6°19′52″W

- Comarca
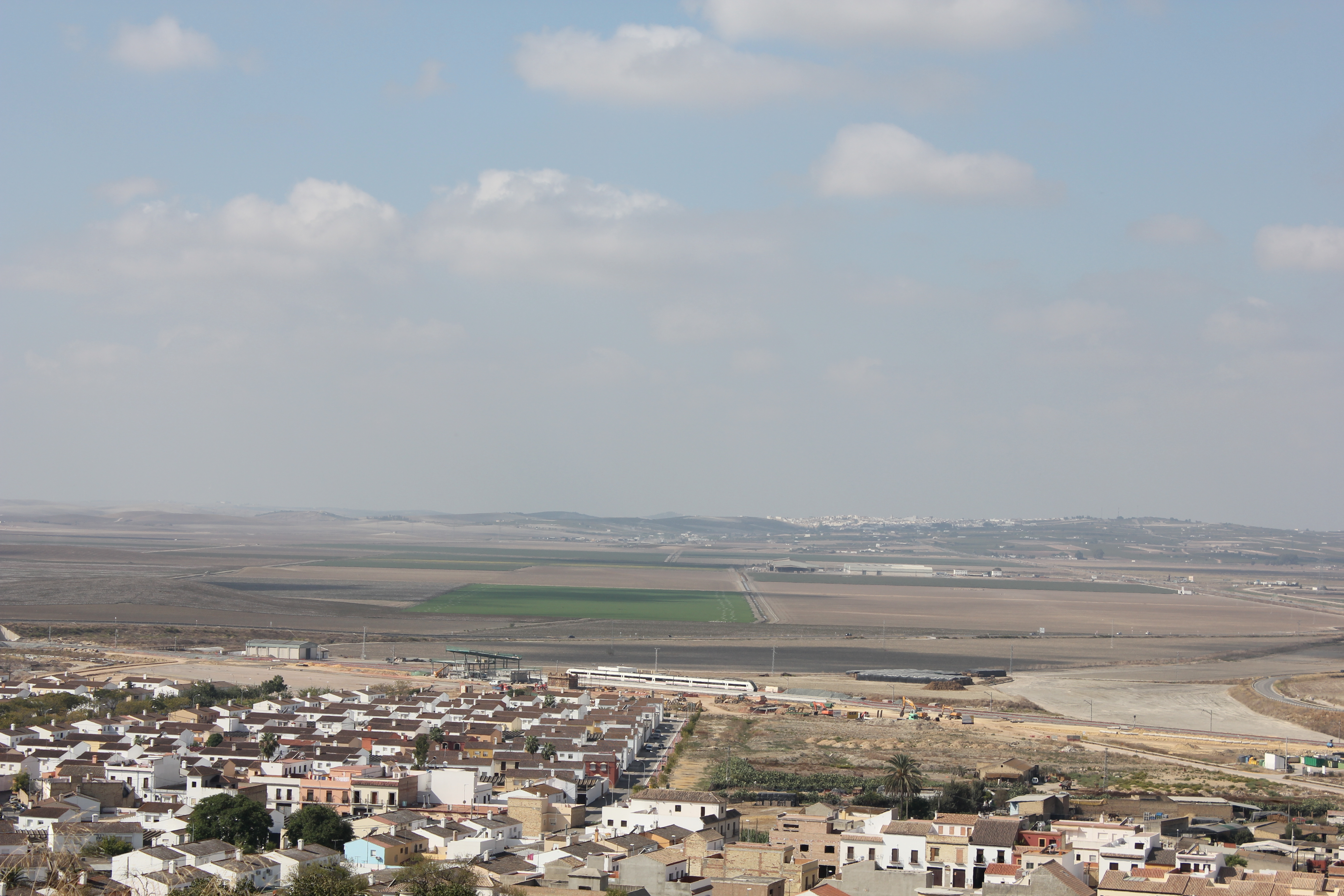
- Trebujena and Bajo Guadalquivir from Lebrija's castle

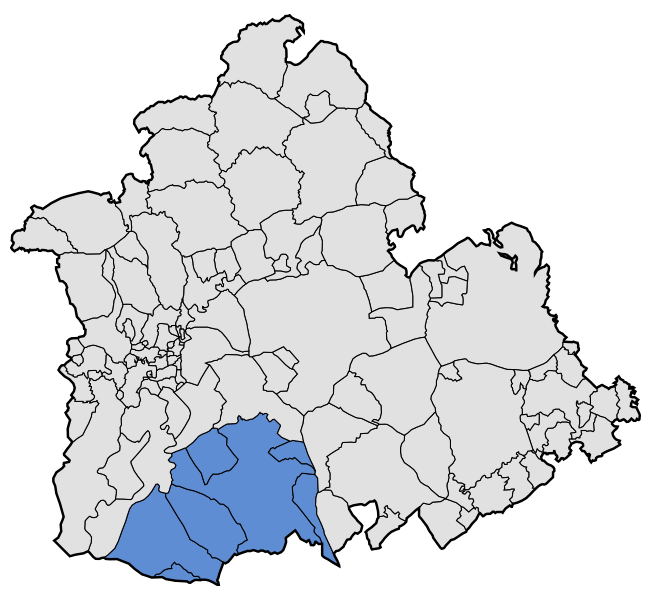
- Country: Spain
- Autonomous community: Andalusia
- Province: Seville
- Capital: Lebrija
- Municipalities: List: El Coronil, El Cuervo de Sevilla, Las Cabezas de San Juan, Lebrija, Los Molares, Los Palacios y Villafranca, El Palmar de Troya, Utrera

Area
  - Total: 1,561 km^{2} (603 sq mi)

Population
  - Total: 147,183
  - Density: 94.29/km^{2} (244.2/sq mi)
- Time zone: UTC+1 (CET)
  - Summer (DST): UTC+2 (CEST)

The comarca of Bajo Guadalquivir is a comarca in the province of Seville, in Andalucia, Spain. A Spanish comarca is roughly the equivalent of a county in the United States or Canada, a riding in the United Kingdom, or a Landkreis in Germany.

Is formed by eight municipalities of the province of Seville:

- El Coronil
- El Cuervo de Sevilla
- Las Cabezas de San Juan
- Lebrija
- Los Molares
- Los Palacios y Villafranca
- El Palmar de Troya
- Utrera
