= Utrera =

- Municipality
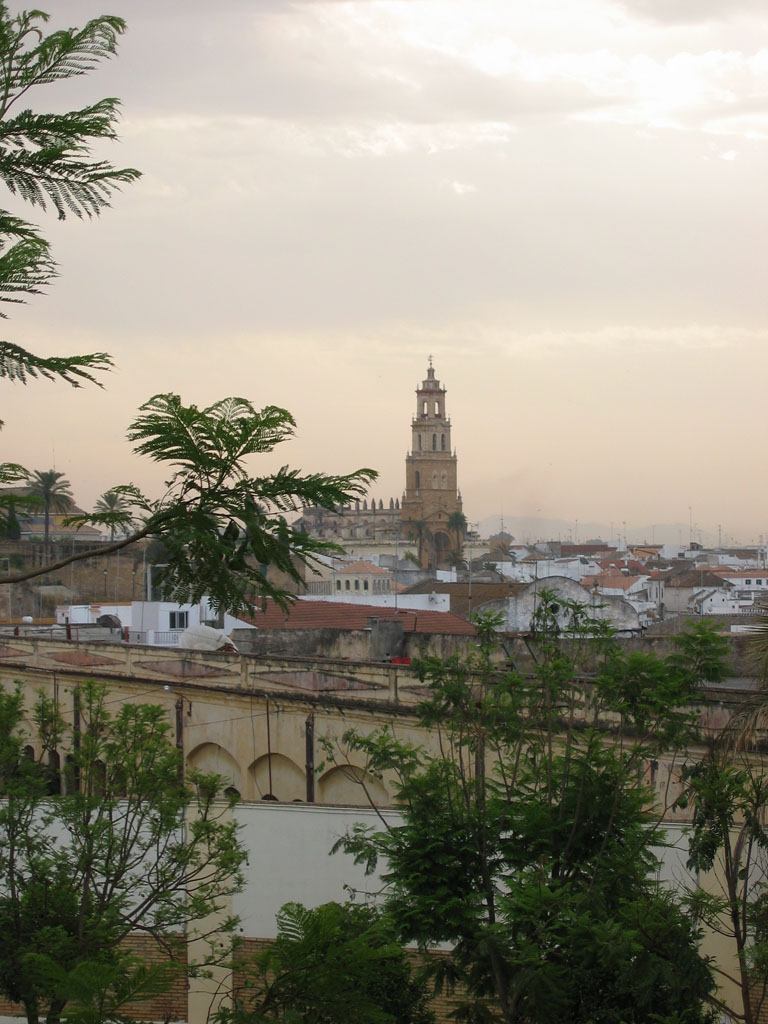

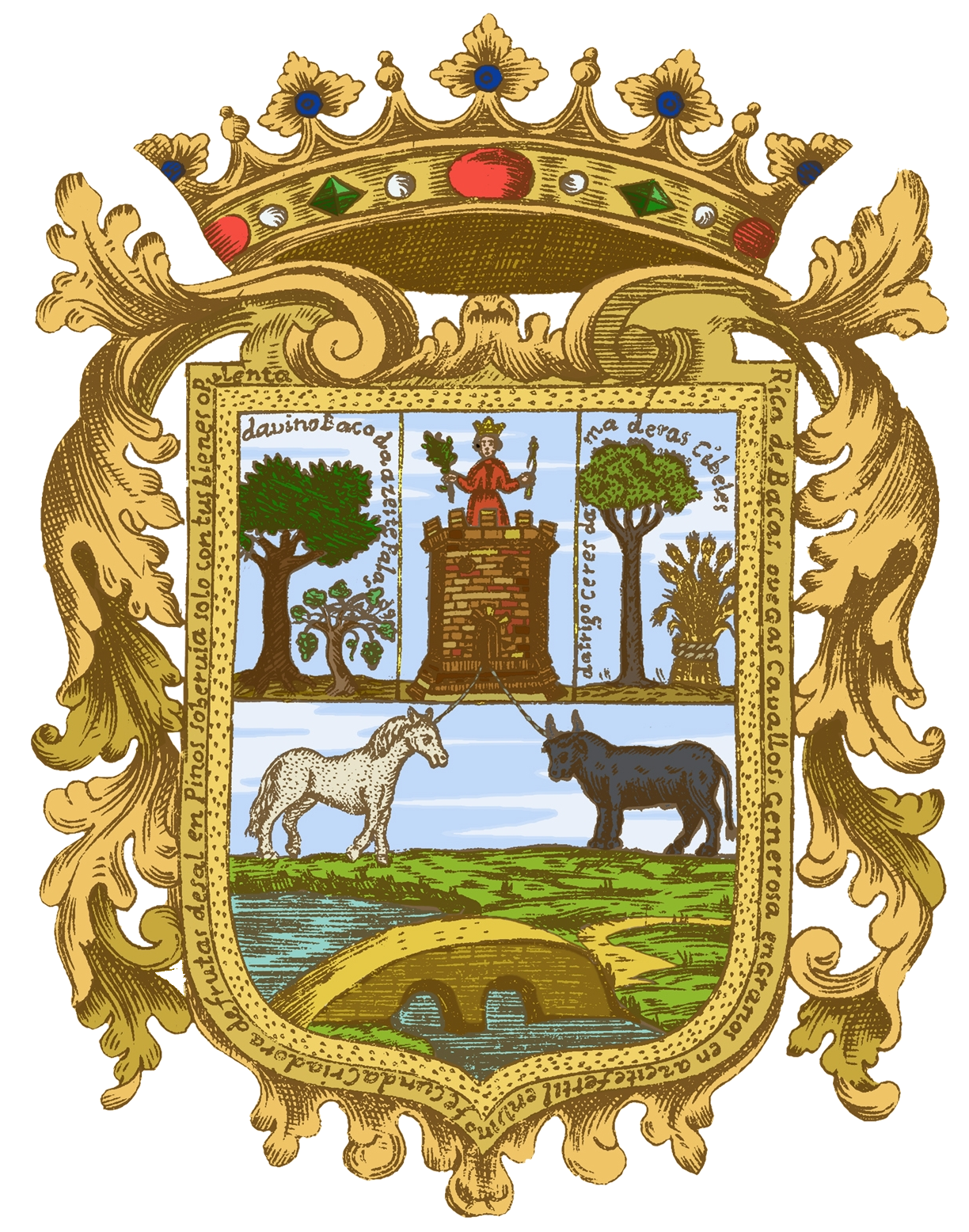
- Flag Coat of arms

- Location in Spain Utrera (Europe)
- Coordinates: 37°10′57″N 5°46′54″W
- Country: Spain
- Autonomous Community: Andalusia
- Province: Seville
- Comarca: La Campiña

Government
  - Mayor: Francisco de Paula Jiménez (PP)

Area
  - Total: 684.26 km^{2} (264.19 sq mi)
- Elevation (AMSL): 49 m (161 ft)

Population (2025-01-01)
  - Total: 52,403
  - Density: 76.583/km^{2} (198.35/sq mi)
- Time zone: UTC+1 (CET)
  - Summer (DST): UTC+2 (CEST (GMT +2))
- Postal code: 41710
- Area code: +34 (Spain) + 95 (Sevilla)
- Website: www.utrera.org

Utrera (Spanish pronunciation: [uˈtɾeɾa]) is a municipality in south-west Spain. It is in the province of Seville, in the autonomous community of Andalusia. As of 2018 it has a population of 52,617.

The town is of great historical interest. It was occupied by Muslims in the 8th century and was not finally incorporated into the kingdom of Castile until 1340. Records about the town date back to the 13th century, when Alfonso X overran Utrera as part of his conquest of Seville, located 30 km to the northwest. However, archaeological work shows people have lived on the site since pre-Roman times. Today the town's five chapels, dating from the 14th to 18th centuries, churches and 14th century castle are popular tourist attractions for visitors to Andalusia. Archeologists have recently discovered that a building dating to the 14th century, most recently used as a bar, was actually built as a synagogue more than 600 years ago. The discovery is evidence of a Jewish community in Utrera prior to the expulsion of Spain's Jews in 1492 and is one of five still standing medieval synagogues in Spain.

Utrera is considered the cradle of the fighting bull and the flamenco, and there are many cattle farms in its municipal district.

The area is known for numerous festivities, particularly the fair, which is celebrated during the days before and after the day of Utrera's patron saint: the Virgin of Consolación. This fiesta attracts many people from all over Andalusia and Spain as a whole.

Utrera is also known for the mostachón, a kind of small flattened cake made with sugar and cinnamon.

== Climate ==
Utrera's climate is characterized by the annual alternation between a dry period, which lasts more than four months and has high temperatures, and a humid season in autumn and winter with mild temperatures.

The monthly distribution of rain corresponds to the one typical of the Mediterranean climate; the rainy season takes place during the autumn and the winter. During summer the absence of rain prevails, except for very occasional summer storms. About 40% of rainfall occurs during the autumn.

The average annual temperature is 17.5 °C. The average absolute maximum temperature is 41.9 °C. The coldest month is January and the average absolute minimum temperature is 0.8 °C.

Sunny days with cloudless skies are predominant year round.

== Leisure time and festivities ==
- Procession of the Three Wise Men on 5 January. The Three Kings and characters from tales and movies are depicted on floats, from which sweets and trinkets are thrown to the children. On this day it is very typical to eat a cake called "roscón de Reyes", which comes with a little gift inside.
- Carnival, celebrated at the end of February. There is a contest organized by city hall featuring elaborate dresses, and prizes are awarded to those judged the winners.
- Andalusia Day & Bicycle day on 28 February. Andalusia Day commemorates the day when Andalusia's Statute of Autonomy was approved. Bicycle Day, in which groups of people ride around the city on bicycles, is celebrated the same day. There are raffles and performances after the ride.
- Holy Week (Semana Santa). The different brotherhoods of Utrera walk through the city carrying images of Jesus Christ, the Virgin, and scenes of Christ's Passion in procession from the churches. These are followed by musical bands and "nazarenos", i.e., people doing penance and giving thanks for special events in their lives. It is similar to Seville's Holy Week.
- Tapas Fair, celebrated in March since 2000. Various tapas from all over Spain are prepared and served; these are sold at a low price and usually consumed with beer.
- National Painting Contest "City of Utrera" in May
- The crowning of the Virgin of Consolación on 1 May. The Virgin of Consolación is Utrera's patron saint. Many people from different parts of Andalusia make a pilgrimage to this sanctuary to pray for the saint's intercession or give thanks for events such as a recovery from illness.
- Pilgrimage of the Virgin of Fátima around 13 May
- Corpus Christi, May or June
- Feast of St. John on 24 June. Figures and caricatures representing stand out events and celebrities of the year are burned as part of a very old tradition imported from other parts of Spain.
- Potaje Gitano on the last Saturday of June, a flamenco festival
- Castle's auditorium: July and August, with programmed cinema, theatre, music and dance showings and performances
- Consolación Fair around 8 September. The Utrera Fair is well attended, attracting attendees from other localities in the province of Seville and Andalusia. Very similar to the Seville Fair, but less crowded, it and Holy Week are the most notable annual events in the city. Many people go dressed in typical Sevillanas and flamenco costumes. In the afternoon, the people usually have a typical Andalusian meal for lunch. Afterwards many of them ride horses in organized Sevillanas contests. At night various kinds of music are performed, while people drink and dance until dawn.
- Activities at the "Casa de Cultura" (House of Culture) from October until June.
- Municipal Theatre "Enrique de la Cuadra", season from October until June.

== Transportation ==
=== Railway ===
- C-1 line of Cercanías (the regional rail).
- Stop: Andalucía Exprés and Altaria

=== Bus ===
- Utrera - Los Palacios y Villafranca - Las Cabezas de San Juan - Lebrija - Trebujena - Sanlúcar de Barrameda - Chipiona. (Los Amarillos)
- Utrera - Los Palacios y Villafranca (Los Amarillos)
- Jerez - El Cuervo - Las Cabezas de San Juan - Utrera - Marchena - Arahal - Écija (Los Amarillos)
- Utrera - Hospital Tomillar - Dos Hermanas - Hospital Valme (Los Amarillos)
- Coripe - Puerto Serrano - Montellano - El Coronil - Los Molares - Utrera - Alcalá de Guadaíra - Sevilla (Casal)
- Utrera - El Palmar de Troya - Guadalema de los Quintero - El Torbiscal - Trabajo - Sacramento - Las Cabezas de San Juan (Hermanos Cuchares)
- Utrera - Alcalá de Guadaíra - Sevilla (San Roque)
- Utrera - Los Molares - El Coronil (San Roque)
- Madrid - Marchena - Arahal - Utrera - Jerez - El Puerto de Santa María - Cádiz - San Fernando (Socibus/Sercobus)

=== Roads that pass through Utrera ===
- A-362: Utrera - Los Palacios y Villafranca
- A-375: Utrera - Los Molares - El Coronil - Montellano - Puerto Serrano
- A-376: Sevilla - Utrera
- A-394: Arahal - A-4
- A-8030: A-4 - Utrera
- A-8100: Utrera - Carmona

== Notable people ==
- Dani Ceballos, footballer
- Juan Muñoz Muñoz, footballer
- Joaquín Caparrós (born 15 October 1955), football coach
- José Antonio Reyes (1 September 1983 - 1 June 2019), footballer
- Pepe Mena, footballer
- José Matos, footballer
- Luis Pérez Maqueda, footballer
- Álvaro García Rivera, footballer
- Moisés Delgado, footballer
- Rubén Cruz, footballer
- Carlos Valverde, footballer
- Israel Bascón, footballer
- Rodrigo Caro, historian, archeologist, poet and writer.
- es:Rafael de Utrera, flamenco singer
- es:Fernanda de Utrera, flamenco singer
- es:Bernarda de Utrera, flamenco singer
- es:Pepa de Utrera, flamenco singer
- Carmen Luna Alcázar, anarchist and feminist

== See also ==
- List of municipalities in Seville
