= Carlism =

Spanish political movement

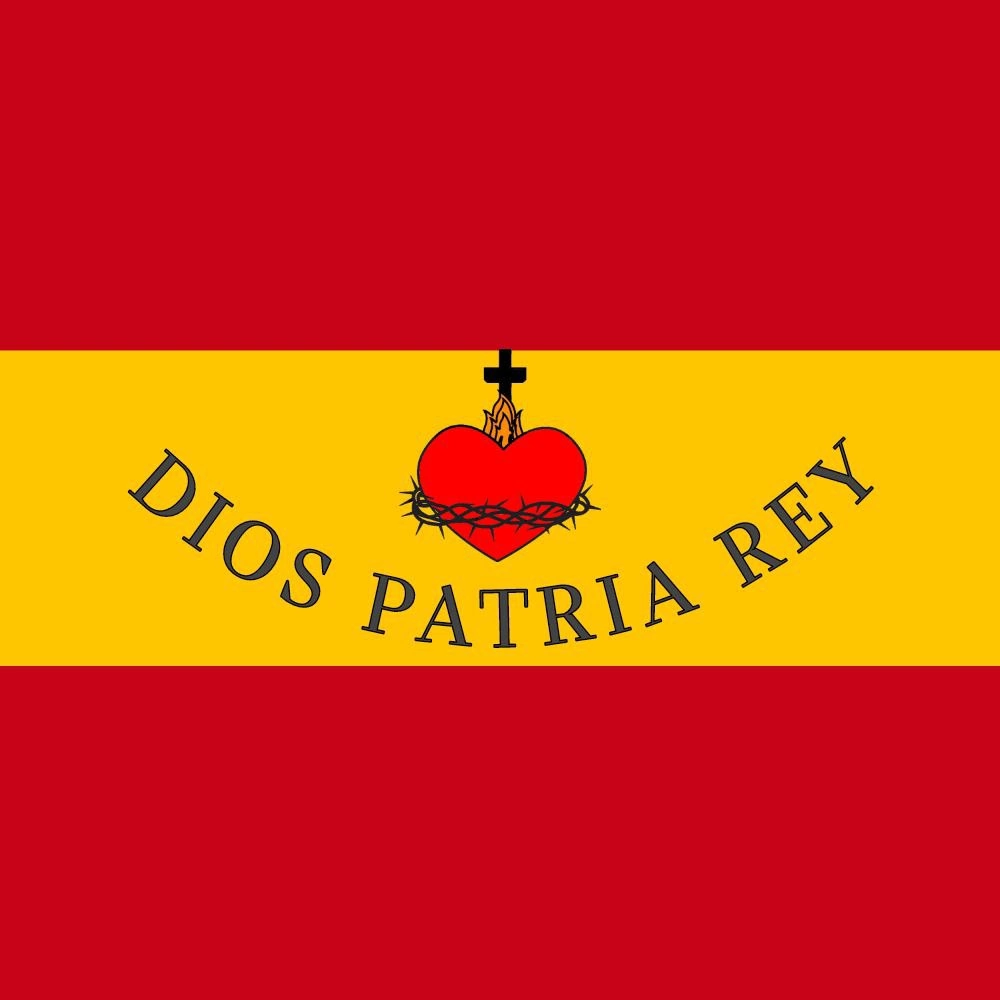
Carlist flag from the Third Carlist War (c. 1875), with the Carlist motto Dios, patria y rey ("God, Fatherland and King")

Carlism (Basque: Karlismo; Catalan: Carlisme; Galician: Carlismo; Spanish: Carlismo) is a traditionalist and legitimist political movement in Spain aimed at establishing an alternative branch of the Bourbon dynasty, one descended from Don Carlos, Count of Molina (1788–1855), on the Spanish throne.

The movement was founded as a consequence of an early 19th-century dispute over the succession of the Spanish monarchy and dissatisfaction with the Alfonsine line of the House of Bourbon, and subsequently found itself becoming a notable element of Spanish conservatism in its 19th-century struggle against liberalism, which repeatedly broke out into military conflicts known as the Carlist Wars.

Carlism was at its strongest in the 1830s, but experienced a revival following Spain's defeat in the Spanish–American War in 1898, when the Spanish Empire lost its last remaining significant overseas territories of the Philippines, Cuba, Guam, and Puerto Rico to the United States. It continued to play a notable role in the 20th century as part of the Nationalist faction in the Spanish Civil War and the subsequently triumphant Francoist Spain, but lost power throughout this period, declining rapidly following the death of Francisco Franco in 1975, the subsequent assumption of the throne by Juan Carlos I, the Spanish transition to democracy and the Montejurra incidents in 1976.

== Origins ==
=== Dynastic issue ===
==== Systems of succession in dispute ====
Traditionally, all but one of the Spanish kingdoms allowed the succession of daughters in the absence of sons and of sisters in the absence of brothers (male-preference primogeniture). The one exception, Aragon, tended to favour semi-Salicism. The most elaborate rules formed the "Seven-part code" (Siete partidas) of the late 13th century.

On 1 November 1700 a French Bourbon prince, Philip V, acceded to the Spanish throne. In the French royal house, Salic law applied, which did not permit female succession. Accordingly, the traditional Spanish order of succession had to give way to a semi-Salic system, which excluded women from the crown unless all males in the agnatic descent from Philip, in any branch, became extinct. It is not implausible that this change might have been enacted at the insistence of a hostile foreign power, as the scenario of such a union could impinge profoundly on questions of national importance (particularly among states that preferred to maintain their distance from policy positions occupied by the Franco-Spanish consensus, of which the Holy Roman Empire was one). Some disagreement on this topic was evident for a number of years, even after it became clear that any question of a Franco-Spanish union was a political non-starter.

Although the Spanish government made several attempts to revert to the traditional order, as in the Decree of 1789 by Charles IV (see below), the succession question became pressing only when, by 1830, Ferdinand VII found himself ailing, without any issue, but with a pregnant wife. He decided in 1830 to promulgate the 1789 decree, securing the crown for the unborn child even if female. The law placed the child, Princess Isabel, ahead of Ferdinand's brother Infante Carlos, who until then had been heir presumptive.

Many contemporaries (starting with the King's brother and the cadet Bourbon branches) saw the changed succession as illegal on various counts. They formed the basis for the dynastic Carlist party, which only recognized the semi-Salic succession law that gave Infante Carlos precedence over Ferdinand's daughter, the future Isabella II.

==== Historical timeline ====
- 13 May 1713: Philip V, first of the Spanish Bourbons, together with the Cortes, Spain's parliament, through an Auto Accordado changes the order of succession to the Spanish crown from that outlined in the Siete Partidas. Where the previous rule consisted of male-preference primogeniture, Philip's new law instituted semi-Salic law, under which accession of a female or her descendants is possible only following the extinction of all dynastic males descended in the male line from Philip V.
- 1789: Charles IV, fearing for the lives of his two surviving sons after having lost four others, petitions and receives approval from the Cortes for a reversion to the traditional Siete Partidas order of succession. However, the law was not promulgated, in part due to protests from the king's brother, Ferdinand I of the Two Sicilies, then third in line for the throne after his two surviving nephews, who viewed the act as stripping him of his pre-existing rights.
- 1812. A new Spanish constitution outlines the rules of succession in accordance with the Siete Partidas.
- 31 March 1830: Ferdinand VII, at the time without issue and his fourth wife pregnant, promulgates the Pragmatic Sanction of 1830 which ratifies the 1789 law, thereby re-establishing the pre-Philippine order of succession.
- 10 October 1830: The future Isabella II is born to Ferdinand VII. After several court intrigues, the Pragmatic Sanction was definitively approved in 1832. Ferdinand's brother, the Infante Don Carlos, up to that time the heir presumptive, feels robbed of his rights, and leaves for Portugal.
- 1833–1876 Carlist Wars

==== Political landscape after the death of Ferdinand VII (1833) ====
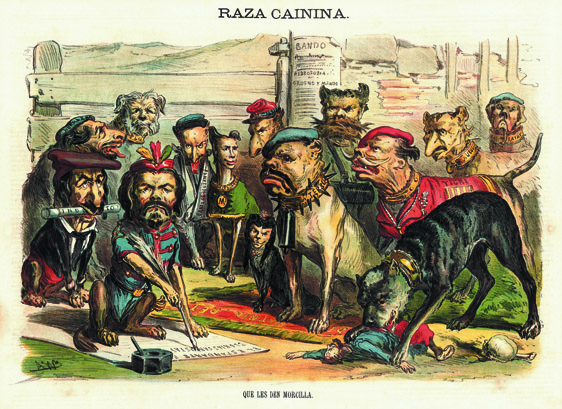
Satire was used in attempts to discredit the opposition, whether Liberal or Royalist (Carlist)

As in many European countries, after the Napoleonic occupation, the Spanish political class was split between the "absolutists", supporters of the ancien régime, and the Liberals, influenced by the ideas of the French Revolution. The long war for Spain's independence from the Napoleonic Empire left a large supply of experienced guerrilla fighters and an oversized military officialdom—for the most part, staunch Liberals. The perceived success of the uprising of 1808 against Napoleon left also a broad, if unconscious, belief in the validity of the right of rebellion, with long-lasting effects on the politics of Spain and Spanish America, extending through the 19th century and beyond.

The reign of Ferdinand VII proved unable to overcome the political divide or to create stable institutions. The so-called Liberal Triennium (1820–1823) re-instated the 1812 constitution after a military "pronunciamiento", but was followed by the Ominous Decade (1823–1833), ten years of absolute rule by the king, that left bitter memories of persecution in both parties. While in power, both groups had divided themselves into moderate and radical branches. The radical branch of the absolutists (or royalists), known as the Apostólicos, looked upon the heir presumptive, Don Carlos, as its natural head, as he was profoundly devout and, especially after 1820, staunchly anti-liberal.

In 1827, Catalonia was shaken by the rebellion of the Agreujats or Agraviados ("the Aggrieved"), an ultra-absolutist movement, which, for a time, controlled large parts of the region. The infante was for the first time then hailed as king. He denied any involvement. The last years of King Ferdinand saw a political realignment due to the troubles surrounding his succession. In October 1832, the King formed a moderate royalist government under Francisco Cea Bermúdez, which almost succeeded in curbing the Apostolic party and, through an amnesty, in gaining liberal support for Isabella's right to succeed under the regency of her mother, Maria Christina of Bourbon-Two Sicilies. If only to get rid of Don Carlos, the Liberals accepted the new Princess of Asturias. Moreover, the first years of the 1830s were influenced by the failure of the French Restoration, which meant the end of Bourbon rule in France, and the civil war in Portugal between both legitimist and liberal parties.

==== Social and economic factors ====
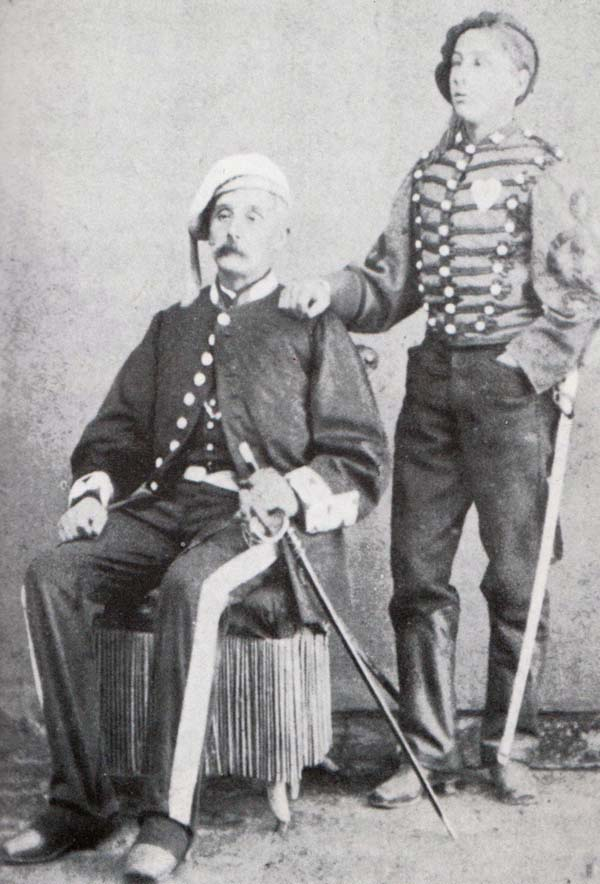
Two typical Carlists of the 19th century: Francisco Solà i Madriguera, of Taradell (Osona), with his son, around 1870.

Besides this political evolution, the years before the Carlist wars were marked by a deep economic crisis in Spain, partly spurred by the loss of the continental American provinces, and by the bankruptcy of the state. The last triggered enhanced tax pressures which further fueled social unrest. Certain economic measures proposed by the Liberals (such as the Desamortización, i.e. the takeover, division and sale of the commons and Church property, initiated in 1821) were directly threatening the viability of many small farms, whose residents were accustomed to rely on the common pasture lands to feed, at little or no cost, their mules and oxen. Widespread poverty followed, as did the closure of most hospitals, schools and other charities.

An important factor was the religious question. The radical liberals (progresistas) after 1820 had grown more and more anticlerical, strongly opposing religious institutes. They were suspected of being adherents of Freemasonry. This policy alienated them from many sectors of the (mostly deeply Catholic) Spanish people, especially in rural areas. The only institution abolished in the "Liberal Triennium" that was not restored by Ferdinand VII was the Inquisition. One of the demands of the radical absolutist party was its reinstitution. Liberals had been, while in power, quite doctrinaire, pursuing centralization and uniform administration.

Besides the Basque Country, in many regions of Spain there were intense particularist feelings, which were thus hurt. While only a secondary factor at the outbreak of the first Carlist war, this anti-uniformist localism, exemplified in the defence of the fueros, would become in time one of the more important banners of Carlism. This won Carlism support in the Basque territories (Navarre, Gipuzkoa, Biscay and Araba), as well as the old realms of the Crown of Aragon (Aragon, Catalonia and Valencia), as those areas resented the abolition of their ancient self-government privileges by issuance of the Nueva Planta Decrees.

== History ==
The history of Carlism can be usefully divided into four different stages, whose dates are only approximate (thus the overlap is intentional):

- 1833–1876: factions pursued power mainly by military means.
- 1876–1936: Carlism reverted to a peaceful political movement.
- 1936–1975: During the Spanish Civil War, Carlists were part of Francisco Franco's coalition. During the Franco regime, some government ministers were drawn from Franco's Carlist supporters, but the movement as a whole was gradually marginalized by the generalissimo.
- 1975–present: After Franco's death, the Carlist movement declines into near irrelevance.

=== Carlist Wars (1833–1876) ===
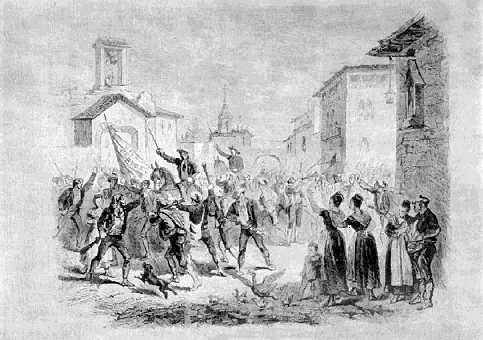
Don Carlos calling the Navarrese in 1833.

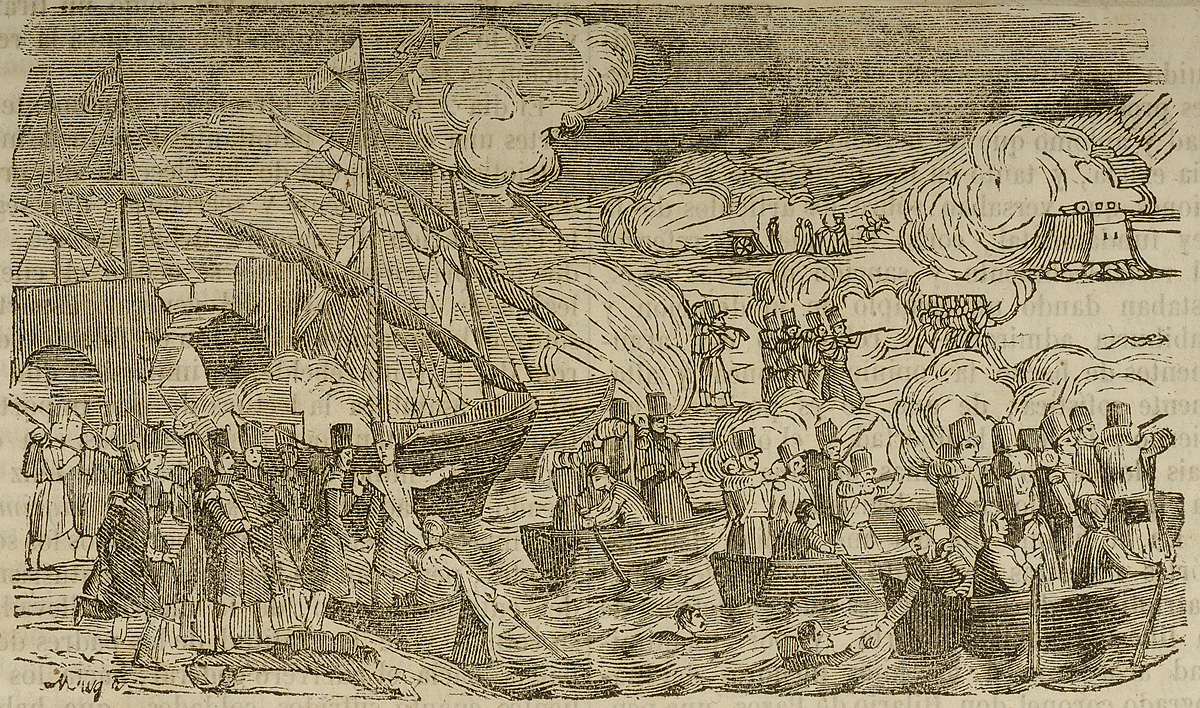
Attack on the bridge of Luchana, near Bilbao during the first war.

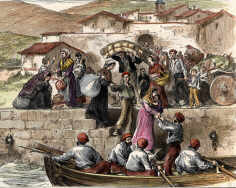
Refugees fleeing through the port of Guetaria in the first war.

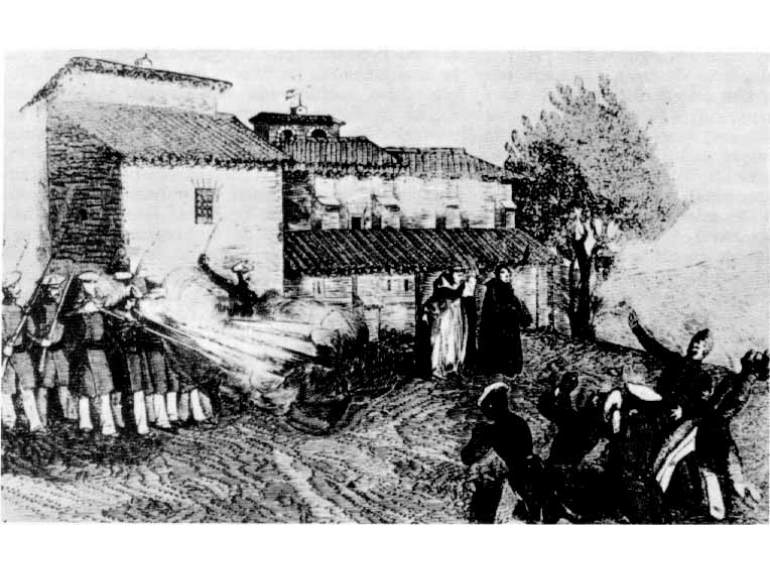
1846 rendition of the executions ordered by Maroto in Estella (1839)

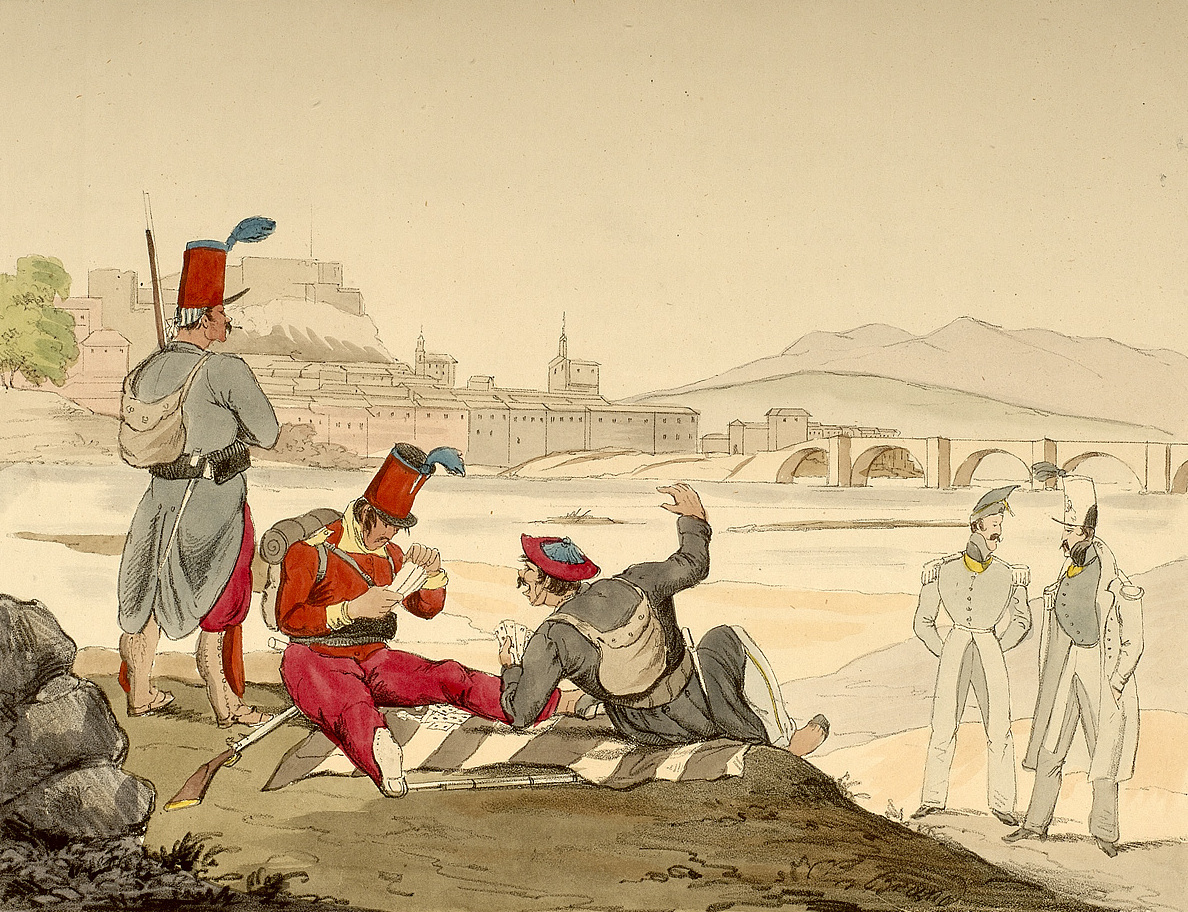
Chapelgorris in Miranda de Ebro

The period of the Carlist Wars, during which the party tried to attain power mainly through military means, is both classical Carlism, because the wars – or the threat of them – placed Carlism on the centre stage of Spain's political history, and formative, as Carlism evolved the cultural and sociological form it would retain for well over a hundred years. Historical highlights of this era are the:

- First Carlist War (1833–1840)—a civil war in Spain from 1833 to 1840, fought between factions over the succession to the throne and the nature of the Spanish monarchy. It was fought between supporters of the regent, Maria Christina, acting for Isabella II, and those of the late king's brother, Carlos de Borbón (or Carlos V). The Carlists' goal was the return to an absolute monarchy. Portugal, France and the United Kingdom supported the regency, and sent volunteer and even regular forces to confront the Carlist army.
- Affair of the Spanish Marriages (1846) was a series of intrigues between France, Spain, and the United Kingdom relating to the marriages of Isabella II and her sister the infanta Luisa Fernanda.
- Second Carlist War (1847–1849)—was a minor Catalan uprising. The rebels tried to install Carlos VI on the throne. In Galicia, the uprising was on a smaller scale. The war was ostensibly fought to facilitate the marriage of Isabella II with Carlos VI, but Isabella was instead wed to Francisco de Borbón.
- The 1860 expedition and its aftermath. That year the Count of Montemolín tried to seize power through a pronunciamiento. He landed in Sant Carles de la Ràpita (Tarragona), but was quickly detained, and forced to renounce his rights. This calamity, his behaviour after release, and the fact that the next in the line was his liberal brother, drove Carlism to the brink of extinction. It was only saved by the hand of his stepmother, the Maria Theresa of Braganza, Princess of Beira; and
- The "Glorious Revolution" 1868. Isabella II managed to alienate almost everybody in Spain, until she was expelled that year by a progressivist revolution. At that point, Carlism, under its new head Carlos VII, became the rallying point for many political Catholics and conservatives, becoming the main bloc of right-wing opposition to the ensuing governments in Spain. After four years of political activity, and some hesitation, the martial option was again tried in
- The Third Carlist War (1872–1876).

==== Points of convergence ====
All three wars share a common development pattern:

1. A first stage of guerrilla activity, across all of Spain.
2. A second stage of territorial resistance is created, with regular army units created. The 1847 war did not get further than this.
3. A third stage of territorial stability achieved through conventional leads to the creation of State structures. No Carlist war went further than this.

At the beginning of each war, no regular army unit was on the Carlist side, and only the third was the result of a planned uprising. The first war was noteworthy for being, on both sides, extremely brutal. The Liberal army mistreated the population, most of whom it suspected of being Carlist sympathizers, to the point of, sometimes, attempted extermination; Carlists, very often, treated Liberals no better than they had treated Napoleonic soldiers and agents, to such an extent that the international powers forced the warring parties to recognize some rules of war, namely the "Lord Eliot Convention". Brutality did not disappear completely, and giving no quarter to one's enemy was not uncommon.

The areas over which Carlism could establish some sort of territorial authority during the first war (Navarre, La Rioja, the rural Basque Country, inner Catalonia, and northern Valencia) would remain the main bulwarks of Carlism throughout its history, although there were active supporters of the movement everywhere else in Spain. Especially in Navarre, Asturias, and parts of the Basque Provinces Carlism remained a significant political force until the late 1960s.

==== Carlist military leaders ====
- Tomás de Zumalacárregui
- Manuel Santa Cruz Loidi
- Ramón Cabrera
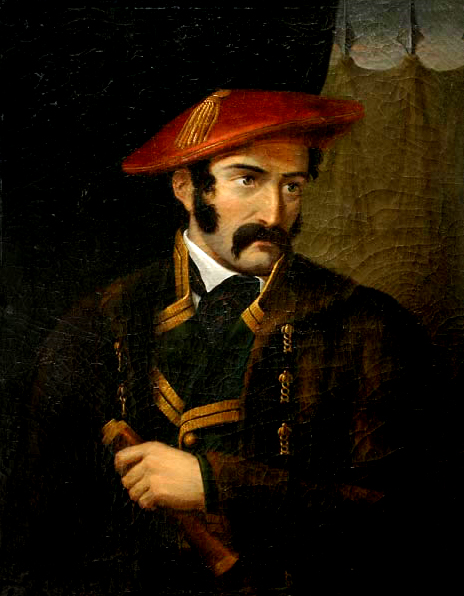
Tomás de Zumalacárregui

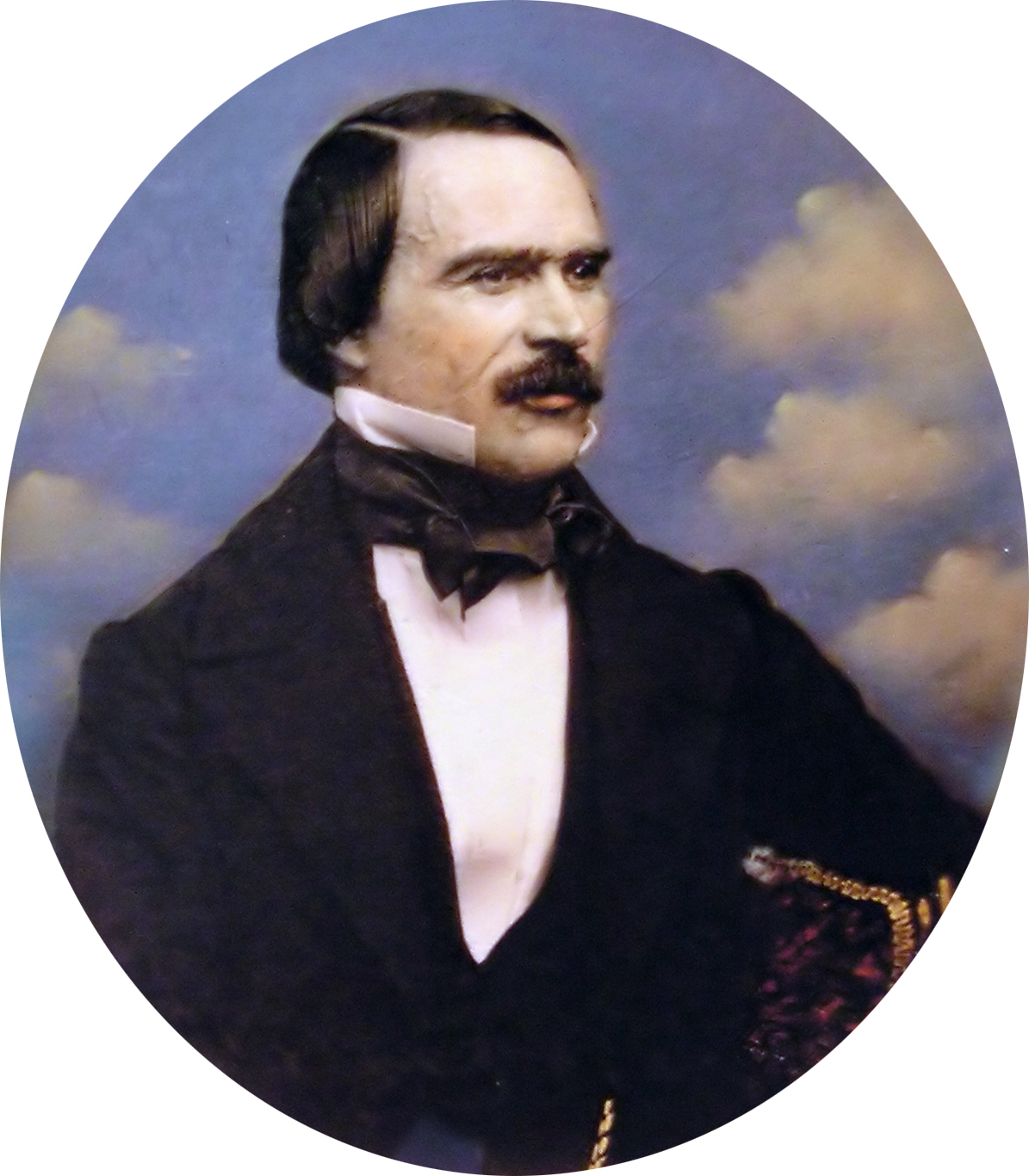
Ramón Cabrera

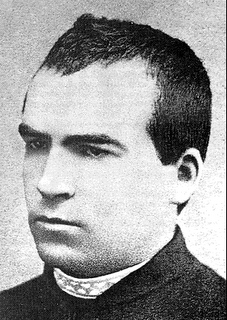
Manuel Santa Cruz

=== Carlists in peace (1868–1936) ===
The loss of prestige and subsequent fall of Isabel II in 1868, plus the staunch support of Carlism by Pope Pius IX, led a sizable number of former Isabelline conservative Catholics (e.g., Francisco Navarro Villoslada, Antonio Aparisi, Cándido Nocedal, Alejandro Pidal) to join the Carlist cause. For a time, even beyond the start of the third war (1872), it became the most important, and best organized, "right-wing" opposition group to the revolutionary regime, with some 90 members of parliament in 1871.

After the defeat, a group (led by Alejandro Pidal) left Carlism to form a moderate, non-dynastic Catholic party in Spain, which later merged with the conservatives of Antonio Cánovas del Castillo.

In 1879 Cándido Nocedal was charged with the reorganization of the party. His main weapon was a very aggressive press (in 1883 Pope Leo XIII published the encyclical Cum multa, trying to moderate it). His stance was an uncompromising adherence to the Carlists' political and, especially, religious principles (hence the term "integrist"). This tendency became so radical that in 1888, Carlos VII had to expel the group centred around Ramón Nocedal, Cándido's son, which thus gave rise to another small, but in clerical circles influential, Integrist Party.

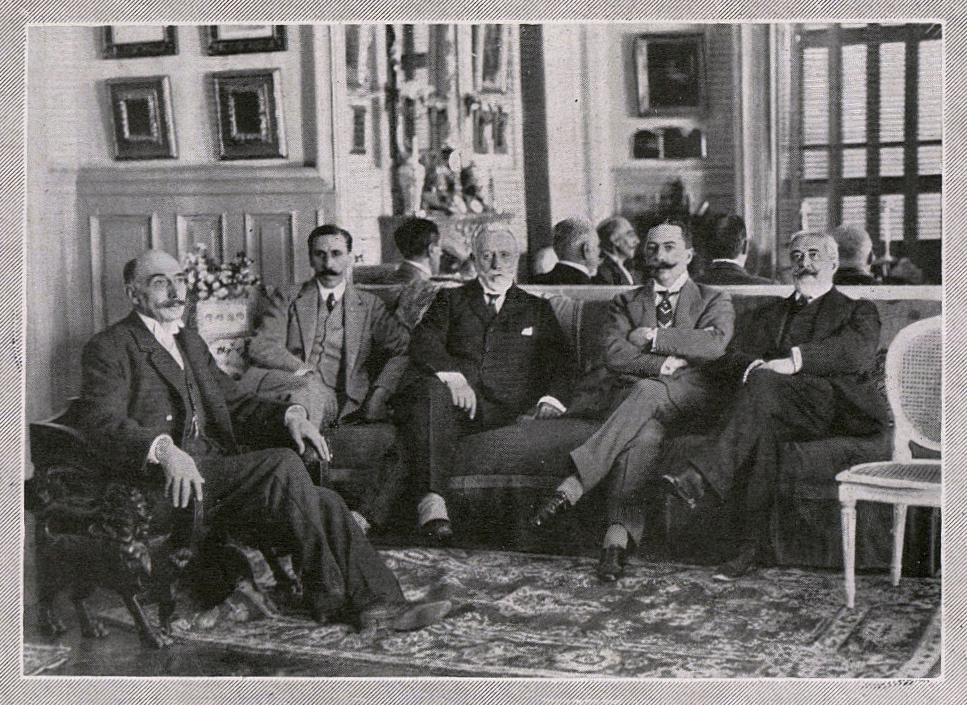
Jaime, Duke of Madrid, at Villa Arbelaiz in Saint-Jean-de-Luz. From left to right: Joaquín Lloréns, marqués de Córdoba, Tirso de Olazábal y Álvarez de Eulate, Tirso de Olazábal, conde de Arbelaiz, Jaime III and Francisco de Melgar, conde de Melgar del Rey.

Meanwhile, Marquis de Cerralbo built up a modern mass party, centered around the local assemblies (called "Círculos", of which several hundred existed throughout Spain in 1936) and their social action programmes, and in active opposition to the political system of the Restoration (participating even in broad coalitions, such as 1907's "Solidaritat Catalana", with regionalists and republicans). During electoral campaigns the Carlists, except Navarre, achieved little success.

From 1893 to 1918, Juan Vázquez de Mella was its most important parliamentary leader and ideologue, seconded by Víctor Pradera, who had wide influence on Spanish conservative thinking beyond the party. World War I had a special influence on Carlism. As the Carlist claimant, then Prince Jaime, Duke of Anjou and Madrid, had close ties to the Russian Imperial Family, had been mistreated by Austrian Emperor Franz Josef, and was also Head of the House of Bourbon, he favoured the Allies, but was living under house arrest in Austria, at Schloss Frohsdorf, with almost no communication with the political leadership in Spain. As the war ended and Don Jaime could again freely communicate with Spain, a crisis erupted, and Vázquez de Mella and others had to leave the party's leadership (the so-called "Mellists").

In 1920, Carlism helped to found the "Sindicatos Libres" (Catholic Labour Unions) to counter the increased influence of leftist trade unions over the working class, clinging to a difficult balance between labour claims and the interests of the upper-class, to whom Carlism was so attached. Miguel Primo de Rivera's dictatorship (1923–1930) was opposed but ambiguously viewed by Carlism, which, like most parties, entered a period of slumber, only to be awakened by the coming of the Second Republic in 1931. In the run-up to the proclamation of the Republic, the Carlists got together with the re-founded Basque Nationalist Party within the pro-charters Coalición Católico Fuerista in the core areas of Carlism, the Basque region, thus providing the springboard for the draft Basque Statute.

In October 1931, Carlist claimant to the Spanish throne Prince Jaime, Duke of Anjou and Madrid died. He was succeeded by the 82-year-old claimant Alfonso Carlos de Borbón, reuniting under him the integralists led by Olazábal and the "Mellists". They represented a region-based Spanish nationalism with an entrenched identification of Spain and Catholicism. The ensuing radicalized Carlist scene overshadowed the "Jaimists" with a Basque inclination. The Basque(-Navarrese) Statute failed to take off over disagreements on the centrality of Catholicism in 1932, with the new Carlist party Comunión Tradicionalista opting for an open confrontation with the Republic. The Republic established a secular approach of the regime, a division of Church and state, as well as freedom of cults, as France did in 1905, an approach traditionalists could not stand.

The Comunión Tradicionalista (1932) showed an ultra-Catholic, anti-secular position, and plotted for a military takeover, while adopting far-right apocalyptic views and talking of a final clash with an alliance of alleged anti-Christian forces. The most extreme proponent of these views was Juan Vazquez de Mella, who argued that Jewish capital had financed the liberal revolution and was now behind the Communist revolution in order, in union with the "Muslim hordes" (even the native tribesmen of the Rif fighting for their freedom), to destroy Christian civilization and impose a "Jewish tyranny on the world". At the time, a Rothschild-Marx link and a bridgehead laid over Spain was being cited in the far-right circles to found these claims.

In Navarre, the main Carlist stronghold, the movement revolved around the newspaper El Pensamiento Navarro, read almost exclusively by the clergy and second in circulation to El Diario de Navarra, another ultra-Conservative daily with an anti-Basque streak. The dormant paramilitary Requeté of the early 20th century was activated. As early as May 1931, Jaime del Burgo (father of the 1979 UPN namesake party leader) and other Jaimist young members organized arms smuggling from Eibar to distribute them among "defence" parties called Decurias, counting on the financing of wealthy personalities (big landowners, etc.). In 1932, the first coup d'état attempt took place against the Republic in the Sanjurjada, with a Carlist inspiration.

The October 1934 Revolution cost the life of the Carlist deputy Marcelino Oreja Elósegui, with Manuel Fal Condé taking over from young Carlists clustering around the AET (Jaime del Burgo and Mario Ozcoidi) in their pursuit to overthrow the Republic. The Carlists started to prepare for an armed definite clash with the Republic and its different leftist groups. From the initial defensive Decurias of Navarre (deployed in party seats and churches), the Requeté grew into a well-trained and strongest offensive paramilitary group in Spain when Manuel Fal Condé took the reins. It numbered 30,000 red berets (8,000 in Navarre and 22,000 in Andalusia).

=== Spanish Civil War and Franco regime (1936–1975) ===
==== During the war (1936–1939) ====
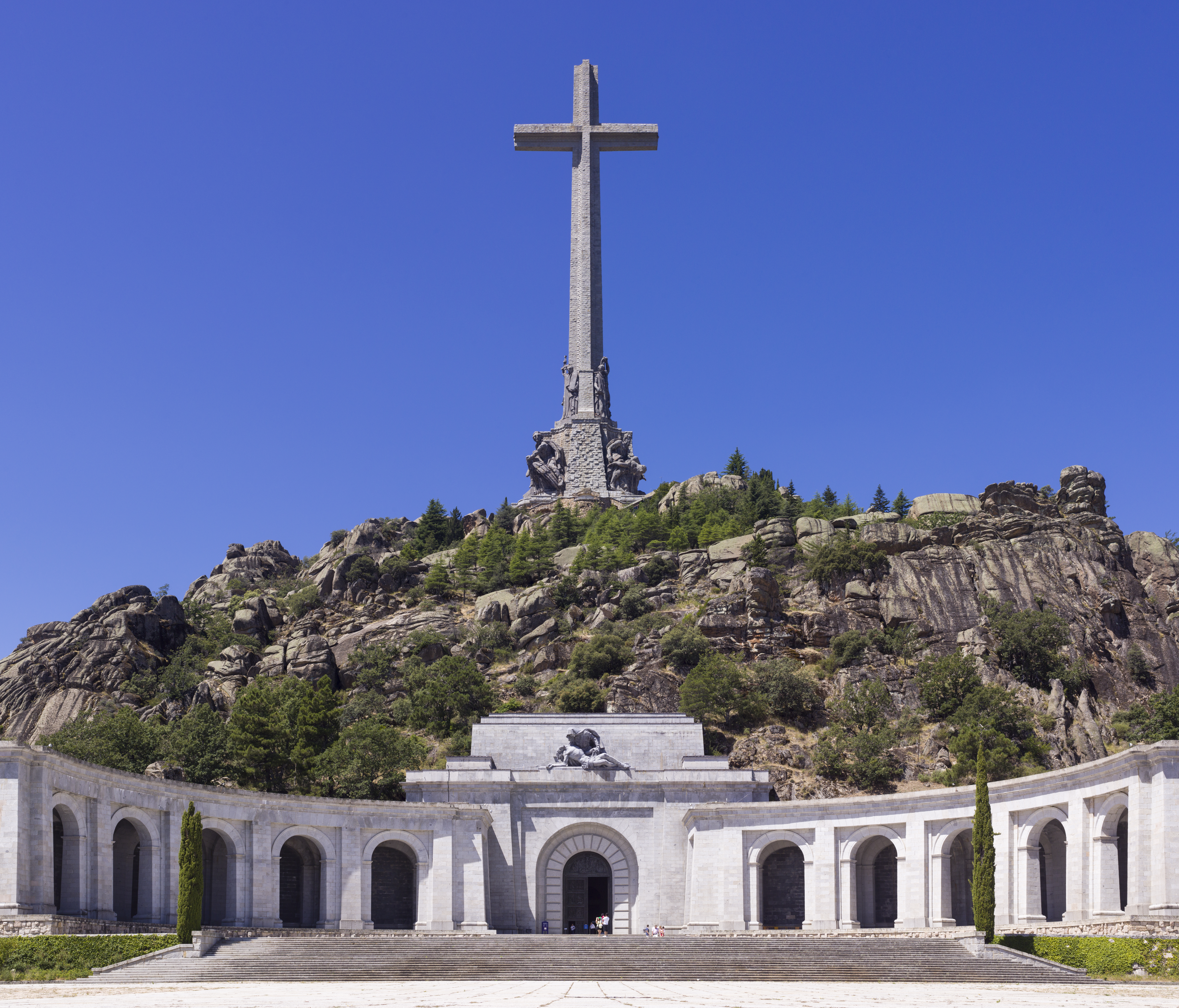
The Valle de los Caídos near Madrid, built by Republican prisoners of war used as forced labour

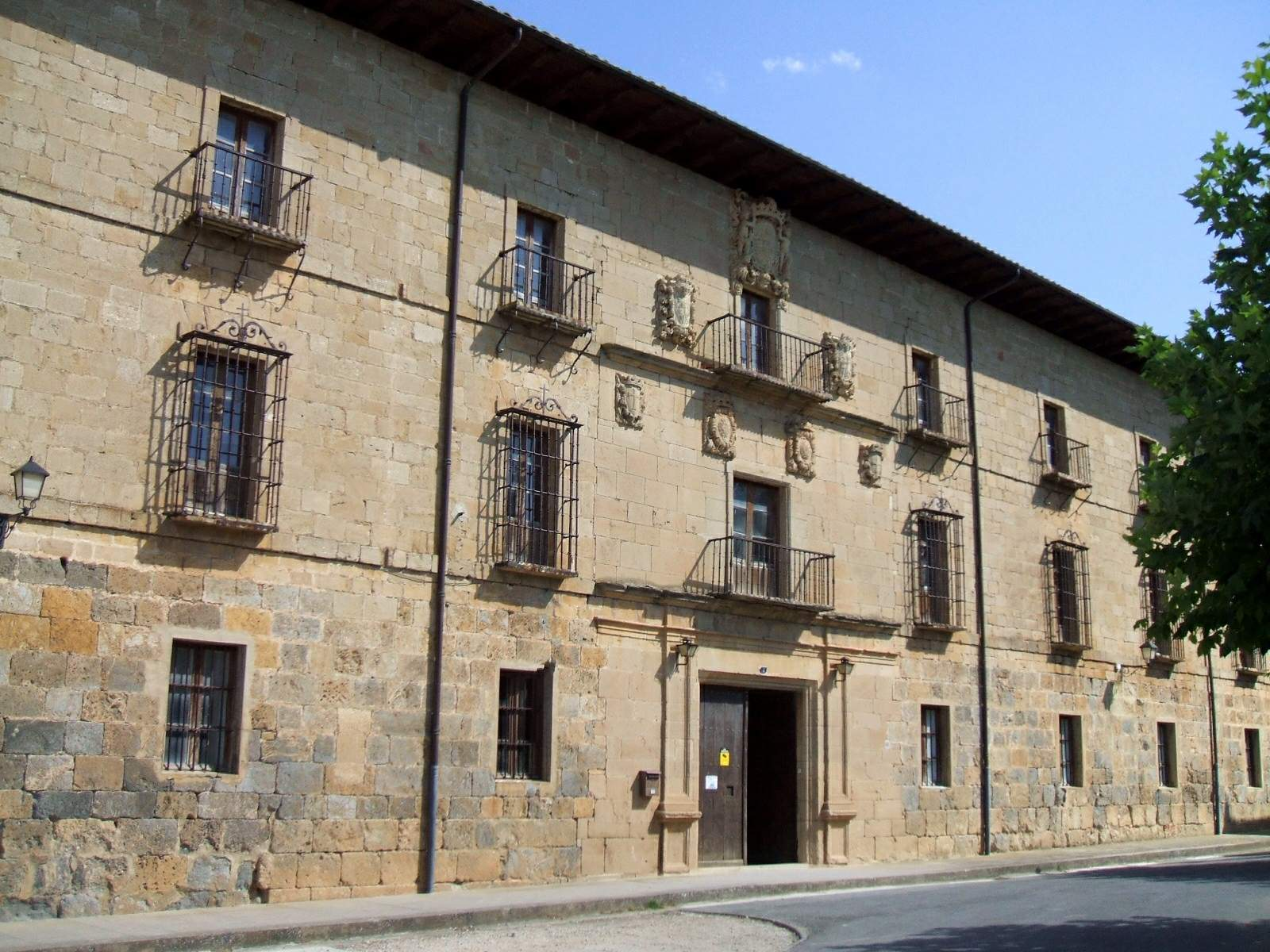
Monastery of Irache, where General Mola held preparatory conspiracy meetings with Carlist leader Manuel Fal Conde and other plotters (July 1936)

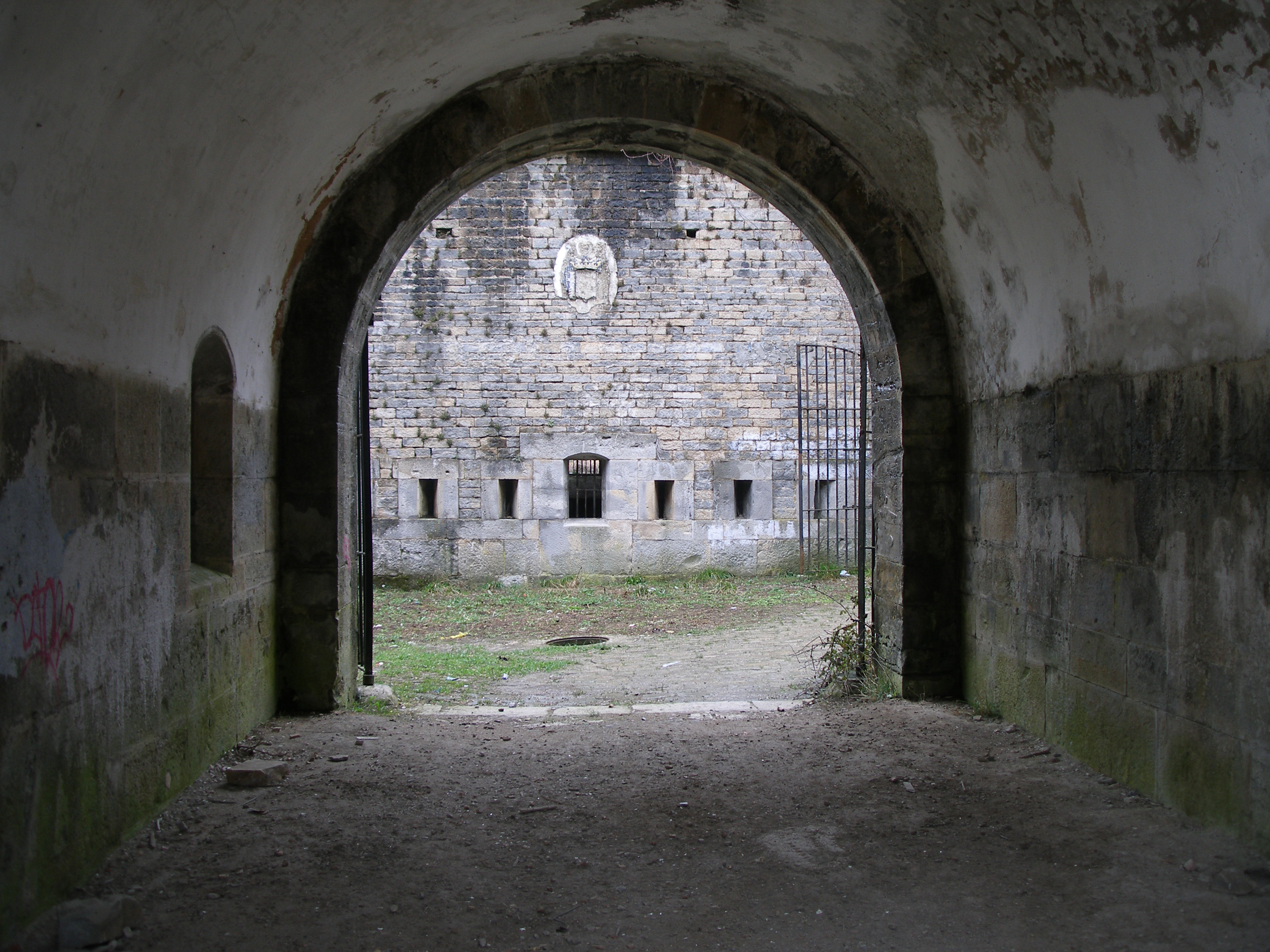
The San Cristóbal fortress-turned-prison, home to one of the darkest episodes of the Civil War in Navarre

The Carlist militia, the Requetés, had been receiving military training during the Second Spanish Republic but had significant ideological differences with many of the conspiring generals. With the July 1936 revolt and the ensuing Spanish Civil War, the Carlists fell naturally if uneasily on the side of the Nationalist rebels. General Mola, known for his openness on his no-holds-barred, criminal approach, had just been relocated away to Pamplona by the Republican authorities, ironically to the very heart of the far-right rebellion.

In May 1936, the General met with Ignacio Baleztena, a Navarrese Carlist figure at the head of the Requetés, offering the participation of 8,400 volunteers to support the uprising, turned into a counter-revolutionary reaction. The principles divide between Manuel Fal Conde and Mola (basically a Falangist) almost broke the understanding for a Carlist allegiance to the coup on 4 July 1936. However, rebellious cooperation against the legitimate Republican government was restored by the intervention of Tomás Domínguez Arévalo, count of Rodezno.

The highest Carlist authority, Duke Alfonso Carlos, did not approve of the pact, but all the same, by then Mola was negotiating directly with the Carlist Navarre Council (Junta Navarra), one that opted for the support of the uprising. On 19 July, the state of war was declared in Pamplona and the Carlist corps (tercio) in the city took over. In a few days, just about all of Navarre was occupied by the military and the Requetés. There was no front.

Immediately the rebels, with a direct participation of the Requetés and the clergy (the Carlist core in Navarre), engaged in a brutal repression to stamp out dissent that affected all inconvenient, mildly progressive, or Basque nationalist inhabitants and personalities. The killing in the rearguard took a direct death toll (extrajudicial executions) ranging from 2,857 to 3,000 to c. 4,000. A bleak scene of social humiliation and submission ensued for those surviving.

The Carlists' prospects in Gipuzkoa and Biscay were not auspicious. The military coup failed, and Carlist units were overwhelmed by forces loyal to the Republic, i.e. different leftist forces and the Basque nationalists. Many crossed the front line to make themselves safe in the rebel zone, and added to the Carlist regiments in Álava and Navarre. Pamplona became the rebel launching point for the War in the North.

On 8 December 1936, Fal Conde had to leave temporarily for Portugal after a major clash with Franco. On 19 April 1937 the Carlist political bloc was "unified" with the Falange under the pro-Franco, umbrella nationalist party, FET y de las JONS (Falange Española Tradicionalista de las Juntas de Ofensiva Nacional Sindicalista). Unwilling to leave the Nationalist movement, but unhappy with the merger, the new Carlist claimant Javier, prince de Borbón-Parma, condemned those Carlists who joined the new party. He was expelled from the country, while Fal Conde was not allowed to return to Spain until after the war. Low-level Carlists, with the notable exception of those in Navarre, generally distanced themselves from the workings of the new party and in many cases never joined at all.

==== Francoist Spain ====
Henceforth, the mainstream kept an uncomfortable minority position inside the regime, more often than not at odds with its official policy, although the Ministry of Justice was thrice given to a loyal "Carlist" (who was accordingly expelled from the Traditionalist Communion). This time was also marred by the problem of succession and internal strife over Francoism. Carlist ministers in Franco's August 1939 cabinet included General José Enrique Varela at army, and Esteban Bilbao at justice. At the same time, two of nine seats in the Junta Política were given to Carlists. Of the hundred-member National Council of the FET, seven seats were occupied by Carlists.

Carlists continued to clash with Falangists, notably in an incident at Bilbao's Basilica of Begoña on 16 August 1942. Accounts of the violence vary, but a Carlist rally (where some allegedly shouted anti-Franco slogans) was targeted by two grenades hurled by Falangists. While alleged fatalities and the number of those injured have long been disputed, the incident led to a shakeup of the Franco cabinet and the judicial conviction of six Falangists (one, Juan José Domínguez, was executed for the crime).

In 1955, Fal Conde resigned as Jefe Delegado of the movement and was replaced by José María Valiente, who formally assumed the title in 1960. The change marked a shift from opposition to collaboration with Francoism, and the rapprochement ended in 1968 when Valiente left office. Franco recognized both the titles of nobility conceded by the Carlist claimants and those of the Isabelline branch. At his death, the movement was badly split, and unable to get wide public attention again. In 1971, Don Carlos Hugo, prince de Borbón-Parma founded the new Carlist Party based on the confederalist vision for Las Españas ("the Spains") and socialist autogestion (then promoted in Yugoslavia). At Montejurra, on 9 May 1976, adherents of the old and new versions of Carlism brawled. Two Hugo supporters were killed by far-right militants, among whom was Stefano Delle Chiaie. The Carlist Party accused Hugo's younger brother, Don Sixto Enrique de Borbón-Parma, of aiding the militants, which collaboration the Traditionalist Communion denies.

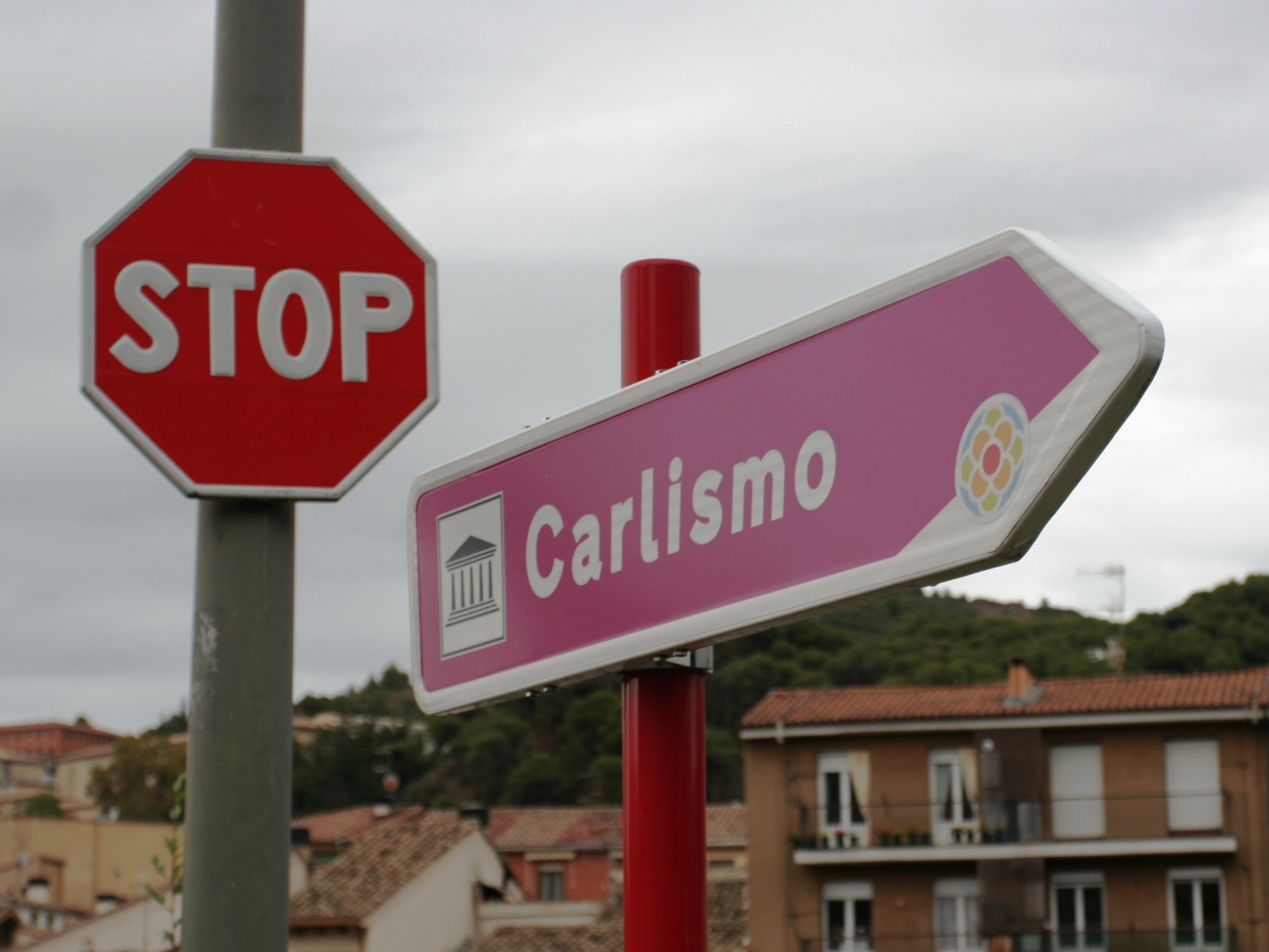
Tourist sign to the Museum of Carlism in Estella

=== Post-Franco period (1975–present) ===
In the first democratic elections on 15 June 1977, only one Carlist senator was elected, journalist and writer Fidel Carazo from Soria, who ran as an independent candidate. In the parliamentary elections of 1979, rightist Carlists integrated in the far-right coalition Unión Nacional, which won a seat in the Cortes for Madrid; but the elected candidate was not himself a Carlist. The Carlists have since remained extra-parliamentary, obtaining only town council seats.

In 2002, Carlos Hugo donated the House's archives to the Archivo Histórico Nacional, which was protested by his brother Don Sixto Enrique and by all Carlist factions. Into the 21st century, there are three political organizations which claim the Carlist identity:

- Traditionalist Communion
- Traditionalist Carlist Communion
- Partido Carlista

== Carlist claimants to the throne ==
The regnal numbers are those used by their supporters. While they were not proclaimed kings, they made use of some titles associated with the Spanish throne.

Claimant	Portrait	Birth	Marriages	Death
Carlos, Count of Molina (Carlos V) (English: Charles V); 1833–1845		29 March 1788, Aranjuez son of Carlos IV and Maria Luisa of Parma	(1) Maria Francisca of Portugal; September 1816; 3 children (2) Maria Teresa, Princess of Beira; 1838; No children	10 March 1855; Trieste aged 66
Carlos, Count of Montemolin (Carlos VI) (English: Charles VI); 1845–1861		31 January 1818, Madrid son of Carlos, Count of Molina and Maria Francisca of Portugal	Maria Carolina of Bourbon-Two Sicilies; 10 July 1850; No children	31 January 1861; Trieste aged 43
Juan, Count of Montizón (Juan III) (English: John III); 1861–1868		15 May 1822, Aranjuez son of Carlos, Count of Molina and Maria Francisca of Portugal	(1) Beatrix of Austria-Este; 6 February 1847; 2 children (2) Ellen Sarah Carter ? 2 children	18 November 1887; Hove aged 65
Carlos, Duke of Madrid (Carlos VII) (English: Charles VII); 1868–1909		30 March 1848, Ljubljana son of Juan, Count of Montizón and Beatrix of Austria-Este	(1) Margarita of Bourbon-Parma; 4 February 1867; 5 children (2) Berthe de Rohan; 28 April 1894; No children	18 July 1909; Varese aged 61
Jaime, Duke of Madrid (Jaime III) (English: James III); 1909–1931		27 June 1870, Vevey son of Carlos, Duke of Madrid and Margarita of Bourbon-Parma	never married	2 October 1931; Paris aged 61
Alfonso Carlos, Duke of San Jaime (Alfonso Carlos I) (English: Alphonse Charles I); 1931–1936		12 September 1849; London son of Juan, Count of Montizón and Beatrix of Austria-Este	Maria das Neves of Portugal; 26 April 1871; 1 child	29 September 1936; Vienna aged 87

=== The succession after Alfonso Carlos ===
At the death of Alfonso Carlos in 1936 most Carlists supported Prince Xavier of Bourbon-Parma whom Alfonso Carlos had named as regent of the Carlist Communion. A minority of Carlists supported Archduke Karl Pius of Austria, Prince of Tuscany, a grandson through the female line of Carlos VII. A fringe movement of Carlists supported Alfonso XIII, the exiled constitutional king of Spain, who was the senior male-line descendant of King Charles IV, through his third son Francisco de Paula (whose eldest son Francisco de Asís had married his cousin Isabella II). The majority of Carlists, however, considered Alfonso disqualified because he did not share the Carlist ideals (and, importantly, because Spanish law excluded from succession the descendants of those who commit treason against the king, as Carlists deem Alfonso's male-line ancestors to have done once Francisco de Paula recognized the reign of Isabella II). Many also regarded his descent as illegitimate, believing that Alfonso XII's biological father was a lover of Queen Isabella's rather than her husband. Most of the following events happened under the regime of Francisco Franco, who skillfully played each faction off against the others.

==== Borbón-Parma claim ====
- Francisco Javier I

Coat of arms used by the supporters of the Carlist claimants to the Spanish Throne with the Sacred Heart of Jesus and Immaculate Heart of Mary adopted c.1942 by Xavier of Bourbon.

Prince Xavier of Bourbon-Parma (25 May 1889 – 7 May 1977), known in Spain as Don Javier de Borbón, had been named regent of the Carlist Communion by Alfonso Carlos in 1936 as the nearest member of the House of Bourbon who shared the Carlist ideals.

During World War II, Prince Xavier returned to the Belgian army, where he had served during World War I. He was demobilized and joined the French maquis. He was taken prisoner by the Nazis and sent to Natzweiler-Struthof and Dachau concentration camps, where American troops liberated him in 1945. In 1952, Javier was proclaimed King of Spain, asserting Carlist legitimacy. Since the death of Alfonso Carlos, his successor by right of agnatic primogeniture had yet to be determined. To do so, it was necessary to trace the patriline of Philip V to his seniormost descendant who was not excluded from the throne by law (for treason, morganatic marriage, birth out-of-wedlock and other reasons legally established in the Novísima Recopilación of 1805, in force at the time of the First Carlist War). In 1952, when all lines senior to the House of Bourbon-Parma were deemed excluded, the claim was taken up by Don Javier (descended from Philip, Duke of Parma, third son of Philip V). Even though he was raised in the Carlist camp and named regent of the Carlist Communion in 1936, his proclamation as king later in 1956 was, it was asserted, not a political move based on ideology, but the consequence of dynastic legitimacy. He remained the Carlist claimant until his renunciation in 1975.

Therefore, we are faced with the last branch descending in a direct male line from Don Felipe V, through his son the Infante Don Felipe, Duke of Parma; his grandson the Infante Don Fernando, also Duke of Parma, Plasencia and Guastalla; his great-grandson the Infante Don Luis, King of Etruria; his great-great-grandson the Infante Don Carlos Luis, successively King of Etruria, Duke of Lucca and Duke of Parma; his fourth grandson the Infante Don Carlos, Carlos III of Parma, and his fifth grandson the Infante Don Roberto, Duke of Parma, Plasencia and Guastalla, brother-in-law of Don Carlos VII by the marriage of this Monarch with his sister the Infanta Doña Margarita (...) From the second marriage of Don Roberto twelve children were born, of whom the Most Serene Lord Infante Don Sixto Fernando (the only male married morganatically) has died, and His Royal Highness the Infante Don Francisco Javier Carlos, Duke of Parma is alive.

— Quién es el rey?: la actual sucesión dinástica en la monarquía española

Changes in the views of some in the Carlist movement polarized Javier's supporters between his two sons, Carlos Hugo and Sixto Enrique (and many more endorsing neither) in the late 1960s and early 1970s. Carlos Hugo turned organized Carlism into a socialist movement, while his brother Sixto Enrique (supported by his mother Madeleine de Bourbon-Busset) followed a far rightist course. In 1977, Sixto Enrique's supporters published a manifesto from Javier condemning Carlos Hugo. Several days later Carlos Hugo's supporters published a manifesto from Javier recognising Carlos Hugo as his heir.

- Carlos Hugo I

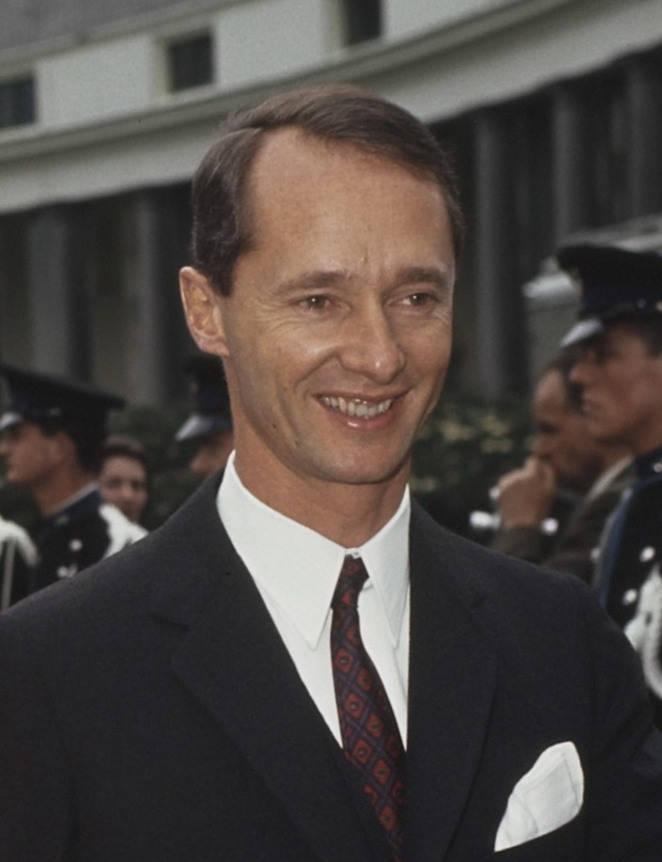
Carlos Hugo (1968)

Carlos Hugo, Duke of Parma (8 April 1930 – 18 August 2010), was the elder son of Xavier. He was a Carlist claimant from 1977 until his death. After alienating many Carlists by his attempts to approach Franco (1965–1967), Carlos Hugo switched to a leftist Titoist, workers' self-management socialist movement. In 1979 he accepted Spanish citizenship from King Juan Carlos I and in 1980 he renounced his membership in the Partido Carlista, which he had created. Carlos Hugo had the support of a minority of Carlists including the Partido Carlista. He also excluded the Luxembourger branch of the family from Carlist succession due to unequal marriages by princes of that branch that were recognized as dynastic by the Grand Duke.

- Carlos Javier I

Prince Carlos, Duke of Parma (born 27 January 1970), is the elder son of Carlos Hugo. He inherited the Carlist claim on his father's death in 2010. Carlos has the support of a minority of Carlists including the Partido Carlista.

- Sixto Enrique

Prince Sixto Enrique of Bourbon-Parma (born 22 July 1940) claims to be the current regent of the Carlist Communion. He is known as the Duke of Aranjuez.

Don Sixto Enrique is supported by the minority Comunión Tradicionalista, and some others who believe that his elder brother Carlos Hugo was the rightful heir, but ineligible for the succession on account of his socialism. Sixto Enrique has never claimed to be Carlist king, in the hopes that one of his nephews will one day accept traditional Carlist values.

==== Habsburgo-Borbón claim ====
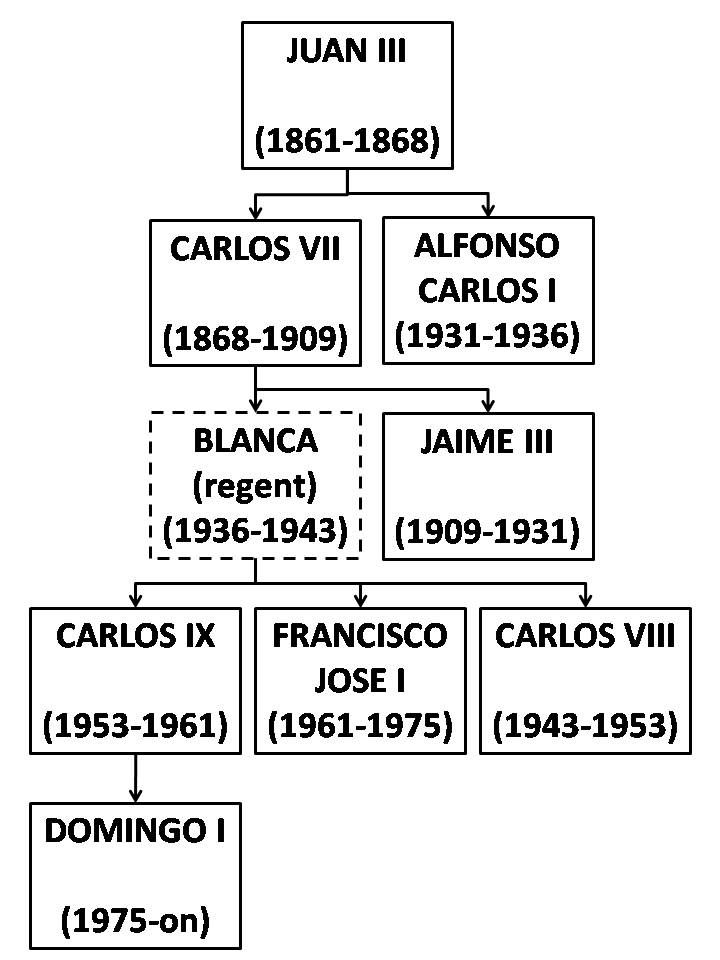
Habsburgo-Borbón claimants

The eldest daughter of Prince Carlos, Duke of Madrid, was Blanca de Borbón y Borbón-Parma (1868–1949). She married Archduke Leopold Salvator of Austria (1863–1931). In 1943, one of their sons presented himself as a Carlist claimant in succession to his great-uncle Alfonso Carlos. Since this claim comes through a female line, it is rejected by most Carlists:

However, the newspaper El Cruzado Español, inspired by the aforementioned elements, developed a campaign of agitation and confusion, and was thus disavowed and declared a dissident. During those days, an extravagant manifesto appeared, claiming that, with the death of Don Jaime (whose leadership they had not defended during his lifetime), the sole and legitimate heir was the Infanta Archduchess Doña Blanca. In Zumárraga and Zaragoza, meetings took place at that time in which Doña Blanca's youngest son, Archduke Carlos Pío, were proclaimed, without further ado. These meetings had no impact thanks to the timely intervention of traditionalist figures who were aware of the maneuver. In view of this, some of those elements affected to abide by Don Alfonso Carlos. Now they deny the validity of his latest dispositions. However, any protest or declaration should have been made at that time. But in every respect, however veiled, he continued to diverge from the traditionalists afterward. On the occasion of Her Imperial and Royal Highness Archduchess Blanca's visit to Spain, this august princess disavowed her own son's candidacy. A few years were allowed to pass for this to be forgotten, and then the attack was resumed. (...) For Blanca to have a right to the throne as the closest female to the last reigning male, all Bourbon lines would have to be completely evacuated, or at least incapacitated, a situation quite different from reality.

— Fernando Polo, Quién es el rey?: la actual sucesión dinástica en la monarquía española

- Archduke Karl Pius of Austria, Prince of Tuscany, was a Carlist claimant from 1943 to 1953. He was supported by some of General Franco's officials from the Movimiento Nacional. As he assumed the title of "King Carlos VIII", the movement that supports this branch of the family is called Carloctavismo.
- Archduke Anton of Austria, Prince of Tuscany, was the brother of Karl Pius and was a Carlist claimant (Carlos IX) from 1953 to 1961.
- Archduke Franz Josef of Austria, Prince of Tuscany, was the brother of Karl Pius and Anton and was a Carlist claimant (Francisco I) from 1961 to 1975.
- Archduke Dominic of Austria, Prince of Tuscany, is the son of Anton and has been a Carlist claimant (Domingo I) since 1975.

In 2012, Senator Iñaki Anasagasti of the Basque Country proposed the idea of creating a united Basque-Navarrese-Catalan monarchy with Archduke Dominic of Austria as its king.

==== Borbón claim ====
- Alfonso de Borbón

Alfonso XIII became the senior representative by primogeniture of the House of Bourbon at the death of Alfonso Carlos in 1936. He had reigned as the constitutional king of Spain as Alfonso XIII until his exile in 1931. He was the son of King Alfonso XII, son of Francisco de Asis de Borbón, son of Infante Francisco de Paula, the younger brother of Charles V. He was recognised as Carlist claimant by a small number of Carlists who considered the death of Alfonso Carlos an opportunity to reunite Spanish monarchists, both Carlist and Isabelline. Nonetheless, despite this apparently attractive opportunity, Francisco de Paula and his descendants were considered legally and morally excluded from the line of succession by many Carlists as traitors, according to the Spanish laws of succession as they stood in 1833 (and as defended by Carlists since then). In 1941 Alfonso abdicated; he died two months later.

Alfonso's eldest son had died, childless, in 1938. His second son Infante Jaime, Duke of Segovia had been pressured to renounce his rights to the constitutional succession in 1933. Both had married morganatically. King Alfonso's third son, Don Juan, Count of Barcelona was his chosen successor.

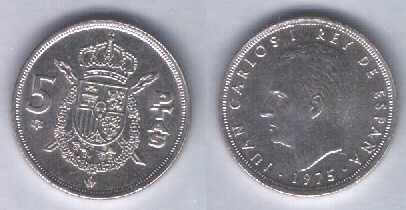
The 5 pesetas coin of 1975 featured the official King of Spain, Juan Carlos I and a coat-of-arms with the San Andrés saltire, Carlists' assumed symbol.

- Juan de Borbón claim
  - Infante Don Juan, Count of Barcelona (20 June 1913 – 1 April 1993) was the third son of Alfonso XIII. He was a claimant to the throne of Spain from 1941 until his renunciation in 1977. In 1957, a group of Carlists recognized him as their chief in his exile at Estoril, Portugal.
  - King Juan Carlos I is the surviving son of Don Juan, Count of Barcelona. He was the King of Spain from 1975 until his abdication in 2014.
  - King Felipe VI is the only son of Juan Carlos I. He is the current representative of this claim. He has been the king of Spain since 2014, confirmed by the Spanish Constitution of 1978.
- Jaime de Borbón claim
  - Infante Jaime, Duke of Segovia, was the second son of Alfonso XIII, and the older brother of Juan, Count of Barcelona. Despite his 1933 renunciation of the Spanish throne, in 1960 Jaime announced that he was the Carlist claimant and occasionally used the title Duke of Madrid; he remained a claimant until his death in 1975. He had only a few Carlist supporters, but among these was Alicia de Borbón y de Borbón-Parma, the only surviving daughter of the previous Carlist claimant Carlos, Duke of Madrid. Jaime also became the Legitimist claimant to the French throne, using the title Duke of Anjou; in this capacity, he had some supporters.
  - Prince Alphonse, Duke of Anjou and Cádiz, was the son of Jaime. He did not claim the Carlist succession between 1975 and his death in 1989.
  - Prince Louis, Duke of Anjou, is the son of Alfonso. He has never claimed the Carlist succession.

== Ideology ==
Carlism or Traditionalism can be labelled as a counter-revolutionary movement. Carlism's intellectual landscape was a reaction against the Liberal, Radical, and anti-religious currents of the Enlightenment in Spain; in particular the Bourbon Reforms, the confiscation and sale of Church property by the State, the expulsion of the religious orders, and Government bans on Catholic schools and Classical Christian education based on the Trivium. In this sense, it is akin to the French (Legitimism) and Joseph de Maistre's thinking, but it also bears a close similarity with the Jacobitism of the British Isles. It is difficult to give an accurate description of Carlist thinking for several reasons:

- As adherents of traditionalist conservatism, Carlists mistrusted radical solutions as a political driving force. Some 19th-century pamphlets expressed it in this form: against a philosophical constitution (liberalism, based on ideology), a historical constitution is proposed (based on history, and Catholic social teaching).
- Carlism's long active history—it has been an important force for over 170 years—and the fact that it attracted a large and diverse following, makes a comprehensive categorization more difficult.
- As they were held together as a movement mainly by shared opposition to the status quo, there has almost never been a single cohesive ideology inside the Carlist movement.
- The ideas expressed inside Carlism were partly and openly shared with many other forces on the political spectrum. The more conservative, Catholic (or Christian democracy) and language revival wings of the various nationalist and regionalist movements throughout Spain have their roots in Carlist thought, particularly relating to fueros and localized self-government.

While Carlism and Falangism had certain similarities—social conservatism, Catholic social teaching, anti-Marxism, and beginning the reversal of the Secularization of Spanish culture by overturning anti-Catholic laws and policies that began with the Suppression of the Jesuits and the Bourbon Reforms in the 18th-century — there were also stark differences between the two movements. Most significant, Falangism called for a strong centralized government, coercive Hispanization through the educational system, and Spanish nationalism, Carlism was more supportive of the fueros, preserving and reviving regional traditions, linguistic rights for local heritage languages, and regional autonomy were their main tenets. Carlism also supports Salic Law regarding royal succession to the Spanish throne and accordingly count as Legitimists.

Variant of the Spanish royal arms with the Sacred Heart. It was a common emblem of the Carlism supporters during the Spanish Civil War.

=== Dios, Patria, Fueros, Rey ===
These four words (which can be translated as God, Fatherland, Local Rule, and King), have been the motto and cornerstone of Carlism throughout its existence. What Carlism understood by these was:

- Dios (God): Carlism believes in the Catholic Faith as a cornerstone of Spain and must be politically active in its defence.
- Patria (Fatherland): Carlism is heavily patriotic, Traditionalism sees the Fatherland as the nesting of communities (municipal, regional, Spain) united under one.
- Fueros (similar to medieval charters): Part of the limitation of royal powers is the acknowledgement of local and regional self-rule (and of other types of communities in the political body, especially the Church). Although the result of a peculiar historical development in Spain, it converged with the concept of subsidiarity in Catholic social thought. Note that some versions of the motto omit the Fueros clause.
- Rey (King): The concept of national sovereignty is rejected. Sovereignty is vested in the king, both legitimate in blood and in deeds. But this power is limited by the doctrine of the Church and the Laws and Usages of the Kingdom, and through a series of Councils, traditional Cortes and state-independent intermediate bodies. The King must also be the Defender of the Poor and Keeper of Justice.

=== Offshoots and influence ===
- Cultural and political regionalism in Spain (not to be mistaken with regional nationalism or separatism) was largely Carlist-originated. The influence of Carlist thinker Juan Vázquez de Mella in this field can still be traced today.
- One of the founders of Basque nationalism, Sabino Arana, came from a Carlist background, and for many years competed for the same audience (Basque Catholics). Compare the PNV slogan "God and Fueros". Spanish Carlists with Franco battled and defeated Basque nationalists in 1936–1937.
- Fuerismo was a doctrine prevalent in the Basque provinces. It supported the Isabelline monarchy but wanted to preserve the Fuero autonomy of the provinces.
- Catholic politics are essential for Carlism. Compare the slogan Christus Rex.
- Victor Pradera's thinking was very influential, through the group Acción Española, in Spanish authoritarian thinking in the 1930s and 1940s.
- Fernando Sebastián Aguilar, Archbishop of Pamplona and Tudela (Spain) caused controversy by publicly stating on 7 May 2007 that the Traditionalist Carlist Communion, among others, is worthy of consideration and of electoral support.

The Carlist symbol

== Symbols ==
- Motto: Dios, Patria, Fueros, Rey
- Flag: the red cross of Burgundy on white
- The red beret. In Basque, the Carlist troops were hence called txapelgorri –though the name was also shared by units of the opposing Liberal side. The red beret was worn as a distinguishing device by Carlists soldiers in the First Carlist War and later became an emblem of Carlists in general, often with a yellow pom-pom or tassel.
- Anthem: Oriamendi

== Name and names ==
The term "carlistas" when applied to followers of Carlos Maria Isidro emerged in the mid-1820s and has even filtered out to public discourse overseas. Following outbreak of the civil war in 1833 the liberal and pro-government press started to use the denomination commonly, though initially also the name of "carlinos" remained in circulation, along expressions like "facciosos", "rebeldes", somewhat less frequent "absolutistas" and other denominations, often intended as insults. The followers of Carlos Maria initially did not use the term, and preferred to refer to themselves in general terms as defenders of faith, monarchy, traditional order and/or legitimism; they cautiously started to accept the name in the 1840s. Gradually in the Isabelline period the term became common and used universally, also by the Carlists themselves. In 1909–1931 the movement was often referred to as "Jaimismo"/"Jaimistas", as the claimant Don Jaime exceptionally did not bear the iconic name of Carlos.

In the late 19th century a related but not equivalent term "tradicionalistas" entered into circulation and was also applied either to the movement in general or to some of its factions in particular; however, in press usage until the fall of the monarchy in 1931 "carlistas"/"carlismo" was 7 times more popular than "tradicionalistas"/"tradicionalismo". During the republican period of 1931–1936 public usage changed; "tradicionalistas"/"tradicionalismo" were used 2–3 times more frequently than "carlistas"/"carlismo", though the former assumed somewhat broader connotation. In the Francoist era of 1939–1975 the press, tightly censored especially until the mid-1960s, gave slight precedence to "carlistas" vs "tradicionalistas" and to "tradicionalismo" vs "carlismo". For the post-Francoist period there is no representative statistics available. Currently in historiography and political science there is little agreement as to mutual relationship between "traditionalism" and "carlism".

Until the late 1860s, the Carlist movement did not assume a formal structure. Shortly before the outbreak of the Third Carlist War the first Carlist political organization emerged; during the following 160 years the mainstream movement was embodied into various political entities, some of them loose and with somewhat different names adopted locally. Relatively little significance was attached to organization, as Carlists considered themselves a broad social movement which in a sense was antithetical to a party. Splinter factions used to build their own structures, and the names of these evolved as well, some names were re-cycled and in popular discourse various alternate, informal or incorrect formal names have been used. Differences between informal and formal names have been often disregarded. The result was naming confusion, e.g. in the early 20th century 48% of press references featured "partido carlista" or "Partido Carlista", 18% featured "Partido Tradicionalista", 15% featured "Partido Jaimista" and 13% "Comunión Tradicionalista", plus at least 4 other denominations in circulation. In the mid-1930s the claimant Alfonso Carlos intended to introduce some discipline and declared that the only formal name be this of "Comunión Tradicionalista Carlista", but he later himself referred to "Comunión Católico-Monárquico-Legitimista". Statistical summary of frequency of various names as in press usage is reviewed in the below table.

period	CCM	CJ	CL	CT	CTC	PC	PCM	PJ	PT
1860–1879	242	0	5	3	0	6807	117	0	143
1880–1899	686	0	3	1449	0	9947	82	3	2348
1900–1919	210	227	183	1390	0	5260	21	1601	1958
1920–1939	210	24	44	2671	7	362	5	257	1114
1940–1959	4	0	0	179	1	7	2	2	16
1960–1979	3	0	0	954	68	3726	4	1	17
total	1355	251	235	6646	76	26109	231	1864	5686

== Related words ==
- Estella-Lizarra was the site of the Carlist court.
- Bergara/Vergara was the place of the Abrazo de Vergara, which ended the First Carlist War in the North.
- Brigades of Navarre were National Army units formed mainly by Requeté forces from Navarre at the start of the Spanish Civil War. They saw intensive action during the War.
- Detente bala ("Stop bullet!") a small patch with an image of the Sacred Heart of Jesus worn on the uniform (over the heart) by most requetés.
- Margaritas. Carlist women's organization. They often worked as war nurses.
- Ojalateros were courtiers saying Ojalá nos ataquen y ganemos ("Wish they would attack us and we won"), but doing nothing to achieve victory. The name is a pun on hojalatero ("tinkerer", "pot-seller")
- Requetés The armed Carlist militias.
- Trágala, expression marking the desire to forcibly impose the ideas most hated by the opponents. Also a Liberal fighting song (chorus: "Swallow it, you Carlist, you who don't want a Constitution.").

== Literary references to Carlism ==
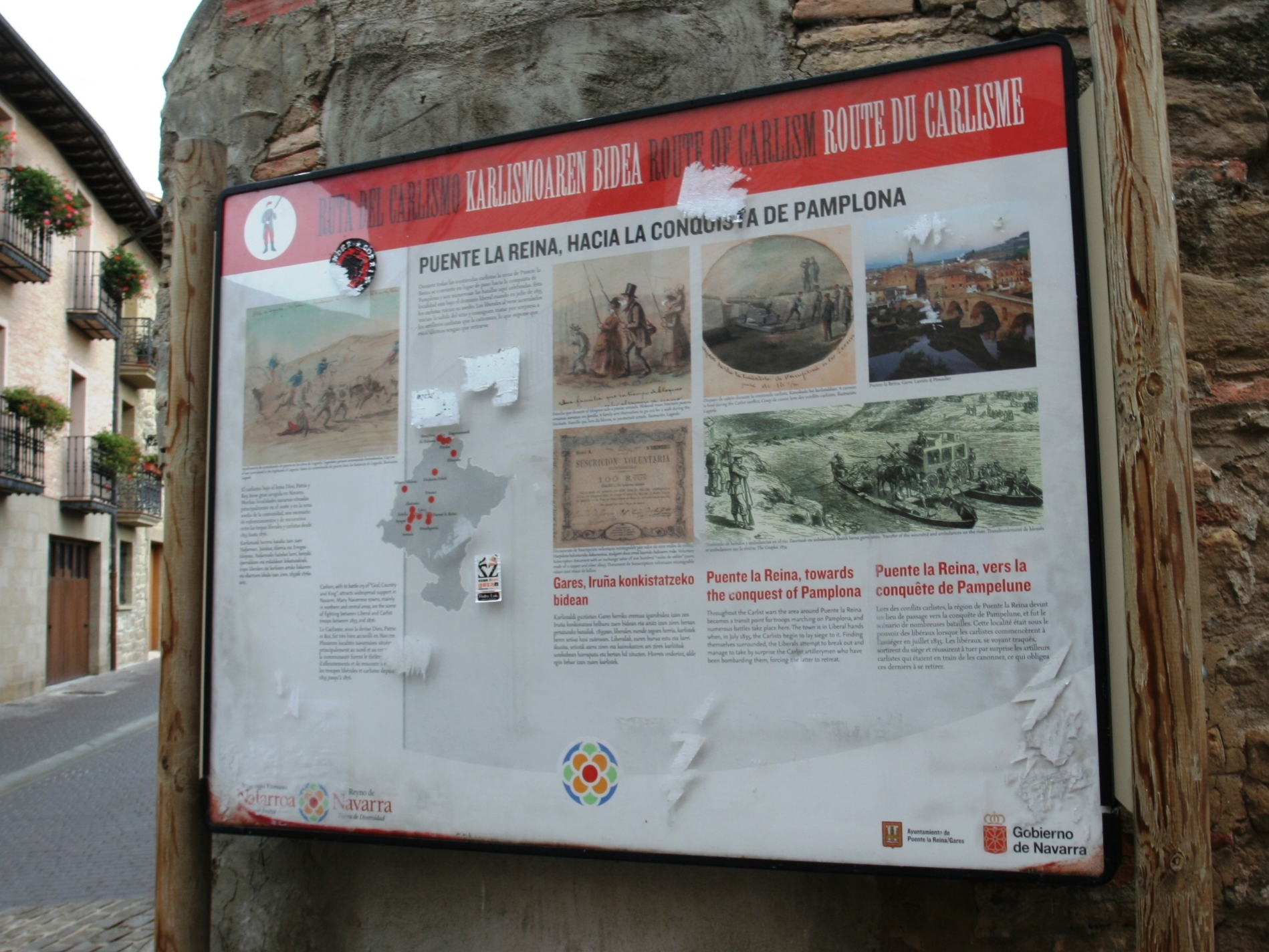
Tourist information panel marking the so-called Route of Carlism

The liberal Spanish journalist Mariano José de Larra opposed Carlism and published several lampoons against it. Nadie pase sin hablar al portero (1833) presents Carlists as a bunch of bandit priests. Ernest Hemingway refers to Carlism in For Whom the Bell Tolls. He mentions two fascists and says, "They were Carlists from Navarra". Francisco Navarro-Villoslada was a Carlist writer that published a historic novel, Amaya o los vascos en el siglo VIII, in the fashion of Walter Scott, presenting the legendary origins of Spanish monarchy as the start of Reconquista. The Arrow of Gold by Joseph Conrad is set against the background of the third Carlist war.

Ramón María del Valle-Inclán, novelist, poet and playwright, was a member of the Spanish Generation of 1898. He wrote novels about Carlism and was an active Carlist himself. Pío Baroja wrote a novel, Zalacaín el aventurero (Zalacain the Adventurer), set during the Third Carlist War, and referred to Carlism in an unfavourable light in several other works. The Spanish philosopher Miguel de Unamuno suffered as a child the siege of Bilbao during the Third Carlist War. Later he wrote a novel Paz en la guerra about that time. In 1895 he wrote to Joaquín Costa about his plans for an essay on the "intrahistoric" element of rural socialism within the Carlist masses. The American conservative writer and National Review columnist, L. Brent Bozell Jr., sympathized with Carlism and Francoism and considered Spanish Catholic authoritarianism to be preferable to American democracy.

== See also ==
- Carloctavismo
- Historiography on Carlism during the Francoist era
- Integrism (Spain)
- Juan Vázquez de Mella
- Legitimist
- Loyalism
- Mellismo
- Miguelist
- Order of Prohibited Legitimacy
- Parties and factions in Isabelline Spain
- Reactionary
- Restoration (disambiguation)
- Royalism
- Traditionalism (Spain)
- War of succession
- List of movements that dispute the legitimacy of a reigning monarch
- Ultraroyalists
- Partidas realistas
