= Synagogue of Utrera =

Synagogue in Utrera, Spain

- Sinagoga Medieval de la Misericordia

Religion
- Affiliation: Judaism
- Status: Preserved as historic site

Location
- Municipality: Utrera
- Country: Spain
- Geographic coordinates: 37.18102°N 5.7808°W

Architecture
- Style: Mudéjar
- Date established: 14th century

The Synagogue of Utrera (Spanish name: Sinagoga Medieval de la Misericordia) is a former Jewish synagogue discovered on Niño Perdido Street in Utrera, Spain built in the Mudéjar style. It is the only extant synagogue in the Province of Seville, and became the second the two known-extant synagogues in Andalusia, along with the Córdoba Synagogue.

On February 7, 2023, its remains were discovered inside of the old hospital of La Misercordia due to maintenance work that had been ordered by the city council in 2021. Part of its restoration process will include its conversion to a museum.

== History ==
The synagogue was constructed in the 14th century and was used as a synagogue until the expulsion of the Jews from Spain in the late 15th century. Following the expulsion of Jews, it was converted into the Hospital of Mercy, which was run by the Catholic Church, and was established to help foundlings. Historian Rodrigo Caro wrote in 1604 that the church had been built on an old synagogue. The Christian community had maintained the original architecture of the building until the 17th century, when the roof was raised and two side naves were added into the hall of prayer, and the extant wall paintings are all dated to no earlier than the 18th century. The main alter was established with an image of Our Lady of Peace.

After its confiscation, the building continued to be used as a nursery. The State later sold it to Spanish politician Enrique de la Cuadra, who sold it to the Gutiérrez family. It was later ceded to the city council of Utrera, and was used as a nursery school. In 1969, it was converted into a museum of the Quintero brothers. In the 1970s and 1980s, it was used as a party venue, and as a restaurant, pub, and disco. In 2018, following a two decades-long abandonment, the city council purchased the building for €460,000 euros. Excavations began on November 18, 2021, and were led by archaeologist Miguel Ángel de Dios Pérez and architect Antonio Jaramillo. On February 7, 2023, it was officially announced that a synagogue had been discovered on the property. The building is one of two surviving ones from Seville, and one of four throughout all of Spain. Its survival is accredited to the fact that despite its abandonment as a synagogue, the building remained in use for the majority of its existence in some capacity.

== Description ==
The known discoveries consist of a prayer hall and the area for the Aron Hakodesh. Searches for the ritual bath and women's sections are still underway.
