= Hilda Farfante =

Spanish teacher and activist (1931–2026)

Hilda Farfante Gayo
- Born: 1931; Besullo, Spain
- Died: 13 May 2026 (aged 95)
- Occupations: Schoolteacher, historical memory activist
- Known for: Campaigning for the recovery of victims of Francoist repression
- Parent(s): Ceferino Farfante (father); Balbina Gayo (mother)

Hilda Farfante Gayo (1931 – 13 May 2026) was a Spanish schoolteacher and activist for the recovery of historical memory.

== Life and career ==
Hilda Farfante Gayo was born in Besullo, a parish in Cangas del Narcea. She was the daughter of Balbina Gayo, a teacher and headmistress of the Cangas del Narcea school, and Ceferino Farfante, a teacher and member of the Misiones Pedagógicas (Pedagogical Missions) that brought culture to rural areas. Both parents, who were sympathetic to the Republican cause, were assassinated on 8 September 1936 by a column of Requetés from Galicia supporting the Nationalist faction. Her mother was buried in a roadside ditch, and her father, who was captured while attempting to aid his wife, was thrown off a cliff at the end of the day.

Fearing the killers' threats to wipe out the entire family, her grandfather and uncle fled into the mountains of Ponticiella with five-year-old Hilda and her two sisters, aged seven and four. The sisters were later separated, and Hilda went to live in Boal with her aunt Guillermina, who was also a schoolteacher. By the age of nine, Hilda was already assisting her aunt in her classes. She later studied pedagogy, becoming a teacher and school headmistress in her own right.

During the Francoist dictatorship, Farfante lived in constant fear of reprisals. Following the transition to democracy, she dedicated herself to the recovery of historical memory and searching for her parents' remains. In 1984, funded entirely by her family, an excavation attempt was conducted in the Vega del Rey area where her parents were believed to be located, though it was unsuccessful.

In 2020, during the drafting of the Law on Democratic Memory, Farfante sent a letter to the Prime Minister of Spain, Pedro Sánchez, outlining specific proposals for locating individuals missing from the Spanish Civil War and the Franco regime. She included a personal appeal with indications of the areas where she suspected her parents were buried. Following the passage of the updated legislation, the Government of the Principado de Asturias carried out an official search, though the bodies of Balbina and Ceferino were not recovered.

Farfante died on 13 May 2026, at the age of 95.

== Awards and recognition ==
In 2013, director Pilar López Solano featured Farfante's testimony in the documentary Las maestras de la República (The Teachers of the Republic), which won the Goya Award for Best Documentary Film.

In 2017, the Asociación 13 Rosas de Asturias presented Farfante with its annual award for her contributions to historical memory preservation. That same year, she was honored with the Rafael del Riego Award for Liberties, a prize sponsored jointly by the municipalities of Tineo in Asturias and Las Cabezas de San Juan in Seville.
