= Francisco de Rioja =

Spanish poet

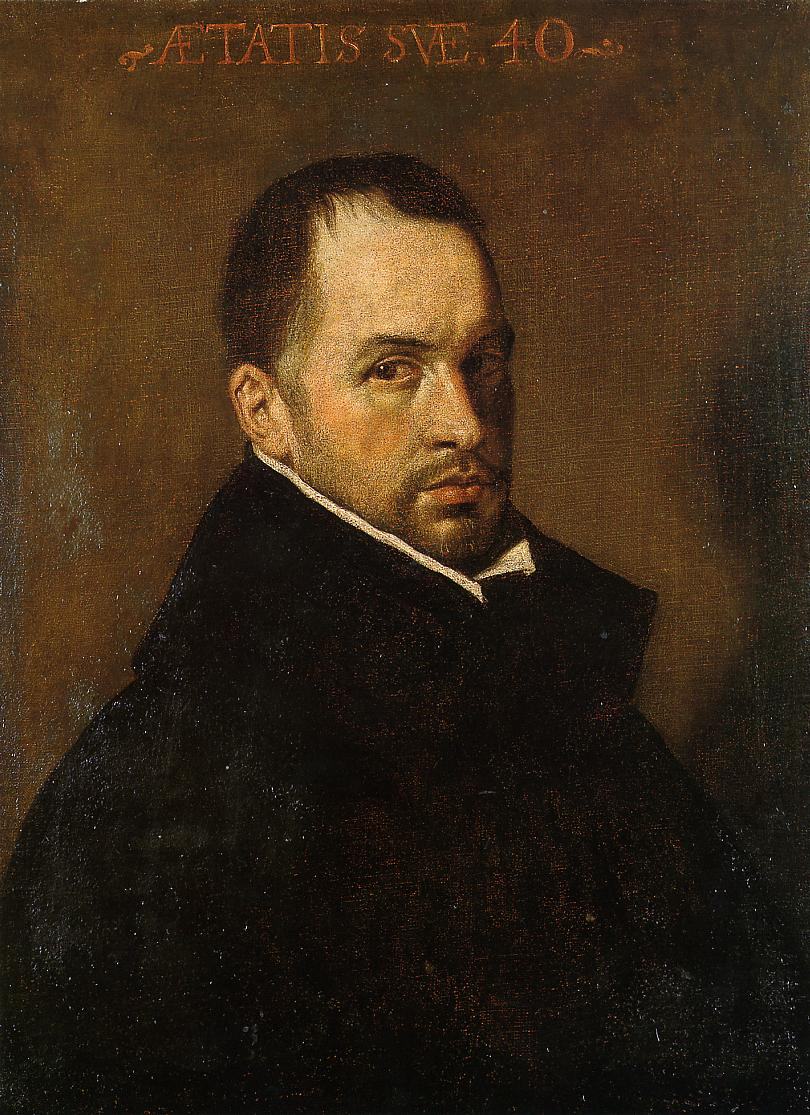
Possibly portrait by Velazquez

Francisco de Rioja (born at Seville, 1583; died at Madrid, 1659) was a Spanish poet. Rioja was a canon of Seville Cathedral and a member of the Spanish Inquisition.

== Works ==
Quintana considers his poems the first attempts at descriptive poetry in the Castilian language. The style is original, the thoughts beautifully expressed, the taste refined, and the versification well adapted and harmoniously blended with the theme. Menéndez y Pelayo writes that Rioja's "Ode to Summer", and those "To Tranquillity", "To Constancy," "To Riches" and "To Poverty" are, after the lyrics of Fray Luis de León, the best moral odes in Castilian poetical treasure.

The ode "A las ruinas de Italia", which belongs to Rodrigo Caro, and the "Epístola moral", whose author is probably Francisco de Andrada, were earlier ascribed to Rioja.

"Pura, encendida rosa" was translated into English by Jeremiah Holmes Wiffen as "The Rose" (1823).

== Sources ==
- Ramón Fernández, Poesías de Francisco de Rioja y de otros poetas andaluces (Madrid, 1798);
- Sismondi, Hist. de la literatura española, II (Seville, 1842), 173;
- George Ticknor, Hist. of Spanish Lit., II (New York, 1854), 545;
- José Fernández Espino, Curso híst. crítico de la lit. española (Seville, 1895).
- Edition of Rioja's poems is that of Cayetano Alberto de la Barrera (Madrid, 1867); Adiciones á las poesías de Rioja (Madrid, 1872)
