= Carmen Luna Alcázar =

Spanish feminist and anarchist (1888–1936)

- Born: 31 August 1888; Utrera
- Died: 18 September 1936 (aged 48); Utrera Municipal Cemetery
- Cause of death: Execution by firing squad
- Resting place: Mass grave at Cementerio Municipal de Utrera
- Citizenship: Spain
- Occupation(s): Fruit and vegetable vendor
- Era: Spanish Civil War
- Known for: Feminist and anarchist killed by Franco's forces
- Movement: Spanish republicanism
- Spouse: Antonio Romero García (m. 1912) Francisco Peña López (m. 1928)
- Children: Ildefonso Romero Luna; Rafael Romero Luna; Dolores Romero Luna; Antonio Peña Luna; Dolores Peña Luna; Camelia Peña Luna; Rosario Peña Luna; Francisco Peña Luna; José Peña Luna; Libertad Peña Luna
- Parents: Antonio Luna (father); María Dolores Alcázar (mother)

Carmen Luna Alcázar (31 August 1888 – 18 September 1936) was a Spanish feminist and anarchist executed by Francoist forces. From Utrera in the region of Andalusia, Spain, she worked as a fruit and vegetable vendor.

Luna was an example of the nascent Republican feminism. A Republican and an anarchist, she was concerned about injustices committed by the agrarian oligarchy. From her stall, she encouraged others in her community to make their voices heard and be politically active. When the Second Republic was proclaimed, she took to the streets of Utrera to with a Republican flag. After the July 1936 military uprising in Seville, events quickly reached her hometown and sent Luna into hiding with her family. While later escaping, she decided to return because of her husband's poor health. Luna was subsequently captured and tortured, and paraded through town. She was then executed on 18 September 1936.

In 2019, a lookout near Parque del Muro in her home town of Utrera in Andalusia was renamed in Luna's honor.

== Background ==
Luna was from Utrera in the region of Andalusia, Spain. She was known as "La Luna".

Luna was born on 31 August 1888 at Calle Resolana, 29 in Utrera at three in the morning. Her father was Antonio Luna, a shoe maker. Her mother was María Dolores Alcázar. Luna was the youngest of several children. Her older siblings were Francisco, Antonio, Pastora, Rafael and Manuel.

Her first marriage was to Antonio Romero García on 7 September 1912. The couple had four children, Ildefonso, Rafael, Dolores Romero Luna and Antonio, of which three survived to adulthood. Romero died on 5 December 1918. Luna remarried on 20 February 1928 to Francisco Peña López.

In 1935, she was living at Calle Salvador Serguí, 29 (now Cristo de los Afligidos) with her husband, a man who was probably a son of Peña's first marriage named Rafael Peña Espejo, and nine children. Six of the children were from her second marriage. They were Dolores, Camelia, Rosario Peña Luna, Francisco, José and Libertad Peña Luna.

Luna lived in a hut near Cortijo de Ulloa in the Andalusian countryside with her family. She was able to support her family because of her work as a fruit and vegetable vendor at the Plaza de Abastos in Utrera, traveling to Seville three times a week to buy fruits and vegetables to resell.

One of her children, Rosario Peña Luna, continued to live in Utrera until she died at the age of 84 in the 2010s. Her daughter Dalia eventually escaped to a Republican area before finally settling in Mallemort, France.

== Activism and death by Francoist forces ==
Luna was an "example of the nascent Republican feminism." Women like Luna, who were politically active in the Second Republic, had their hair forcibly cut, were forced to drink castor oil, and many times were raped and killed by Nationalist forces. Records show 477 women faced this punishment at the hand's of Franco's forces in Andalusia. For feminists like Luna, the Republic was transformational when it came to women's rights. Nationalist forces represented a return to the old, to patriarchy where men controlled all aspects of women's lives, and where women were forced to stay in the home.

Luna was a Republican and an anarchist. As an activist, she was concerned about injustices committed by the agrarian oligarchy. While working at her stall in the market, Luna talked to many people in her town. She encouraged them to be politically active and make their voices heard. She encouraged them to protest. She was labeled by the Franco's forces as being an "individual of dubious morals".

When the Second Republic was declared in April 1931, Luna was excited, taking to the street to wave the flag of the Republic and take part in a celebration in Utrera organized by local Republicans and socialists. After the Republic was announced, Luna continued in her work and went on raising her children. She also hosted meetings of the local branch of the Confederación Nacional del Trabajo (CNT-AIT). They discussed their political ideas and union activities during these meetings. They also talked about fighting illiteracy, but never talked about committing acts of violence against their political opponents. She also hosted two weddings in her hut in Cortijo de Ulloa in this period. One marriage involve local CNT Committee member Cristóbal Torres Gil. Another marriage was between Manuel Martínez Cordones and Concepción Soria Martínez.

A coup d'état took place on 18 July 1931 in Seville. The fallout of this event quickly reached Utrera where a worker was shot and killed by the Guardia Civil. Luna had a residence on Calle de la Fuente in Utrera at the time. The shooting caused Luna to return to her hut, which she had been renting out at the time. Two of her children stayed behind. Dalia remained in the city as a volunteer nurse attached to Casa de Socorro. Rafael joined Republican militiamen in the city.

Following the fall of Utrera to Queipo de Llano's forces on 26 July, Dalia returned to her mother. Meanwhile, her son Rafael fled to the Consolacion area. Luna, and her children Dalia and Alfonso were terrified of what was happening, eventually seeking refuge at the hacienda of a friend who worked as a foreman. Remaining was risky as coup plotters were seeking Luna. To protect her children, Peña and Luna left them behind and escape from Utrera and towards Palmar de Troya. Meanwhile, Luna was able to verify that Nationalist forces had burned down their home. In their exodus, they were joined by the Esponida brothers and an older man nicknamed, "El Menudo."

In exodus, they toured the local area to assess the situation. Determining things were going badly, they decided to head to the mountains of Cádiz to join up with Republican forces in the Republican controlled Málaga. Peña's health was poor, and he was unable to keep up with the party. Before they could head to Málaga, Luna returned with Peña to Utrera. She left her daughter with the party under the care of Menudo. The plan was for Dalia was to join Republican forces. Dalia would eventually be captured by Nationalist forces. Returning turned out to be a bad decision, as Luna was immediately arrested and put into the local prison. The reason for her arrest was displaying a flag of the Second Republic in the street. The prison was located at the Town Hall, in what is now Altozano but was called Plaza de la República. While she was imprisoned, half her head was shaved and her remaining hair was plaited with purple, red and yellow bows. Shortly before her death, she was dragged through town by a horse and marched through the center of Utrera several times. She was accompanied by two guards. She was shot by Nationalist forces at dawn on 18 September 1936 while standing against a wall near the gate of Utrera's municipal cemetery. They left her body there until the end of the day before burying it in a common grave.

One of the reason Nationalists wanted Luna dead was so her death would send a message to other activists, to discourage them from speaking out. They had watched her for months before they took Utrera.

Luna was survived by Peña, who was arrested at the same time. Peña was beaten repeatedly, with one of his daughters being forced to clean his wounds between beatings.

== Honors ==
In 2019, a lookout near Parque del Muro in her home town of Utrera in Andalusia was renamed in her honor. She was chosen because she was "a brave and courageous woman, capable of sacrificing her life for ideas that she firmly believed in." The movement to get a street named after her was spearheaded by one of her granddaughters, Rosario Ruiz Peña. The street is located near where she lived.
