= Trágala =

Song

Song
- Published: 1820
- Genre: political satire
- Songwriter: unknown

Trágala (Spanish: "swallow it") is a song the Spanish liberals used to humiliate the absolutists after the military pronunciamiento of Rafael del Riego in Cabezas de San Juan, at the beginning of the period known as Trienio Liberal (1820-1823).

Particularly the satire is directed against Ferdinand VII, who in 1820 was forced to swear the Constitution of Cádiz when he pronounced his famous phrase "Let us march frankly, and I the first, by the constitutional path". It is said that Rafael de Riego himself ordered, upon entering Madrid, for this composition to be spread. After the intervention of the powers of the Holy Alliance (French expedition of the Hundred Thousand Sons of Saint Louis commanded by the Duke of Angoulême), it became a symbol of resistance against the political repression of the Ominous Decade.

It is probably modelled after other songs of the French Revolution such as Ça Ira.

This song, with different lyrics, continued to be sung in Spain as a leftist symbol against the right, the Catholic Church or the monarchy in different historical conjunctures, notably during the Second Republic and the Spanish Civil War. There were many versions of the anonymous and popular lyrics.

La Pitita is counter song, sung by supporters of Ferdinand VII.

== See also ==
- July 1822 Spanish coup d'état
