= Carlos Valverde (footballer, born 1985) =

Spanish footballer

Personal information
- Full name: Carlos Javier Valverde Doblado
- Date of birth: 19 February 1985 (age 41)
- Place of birth: Utrera, Spain
- Height: 1.74 m (5 ft 9 in)
- Position: Winger

Youth career
- Betis

Senior career*
Years	Team	Apps	(Gls)
2004–2005	Betis C		
2005	→ Dos Hermanas (loan)		
2005–2008	Betis B	72	(13)
2008–2009	Ceuta	27	(2)
2009–2010	Écija	35	(7)
2010–2011	Conquense	28	(2)
2011–2012	Écija	31	(4)
2012–2016	Cacereño	112	(22)
2016–2017	Villanovense	37	(7)
2017–2020	Extremadura	56	(5)
2020–2021	Córdoba	18	(2)
2021–2023	Utrera	53	(12)
- * Club domestic league appearances and goals

Carlos Javier Valverde Doblado (born 19 February 1985) is a Spanish former professional footballer who played as a right winger.

== Club career ==
Born in Utrera, Seville, Andalusia, Valverde was a Real Betis youth graduate. After playing for both C and B-teams, he moved to Segunda División B side AD Ceuta in 2008.

Valverde subsequently resumed his career in the third division, representing Écija Balompié (two stints), UB Conquense, CP Cacereño, CF Villanovense and Extremadura UD, achieving promotion to Segunda División with the latter in 2018. On 19 August 2018, aged 33, he made his professional debut by starting in a 1–1 away draw against Real Oviedo.

Valverde scored his first professional goal on 30 September 2018, netting the last in a 2–0 home defeat of Elche CF. In December, however, he suffered a knee injury which took him out of the remainder of the season; his contract was immediately renewed by Extremadura.

On 17 January 2020, Valverde cut ties with the Azulgranas, and signed a 18-month deal with Córdoba CF in the third division just hours later.
