= Rodrigo Caro =

Reverend Rodrigo Caro
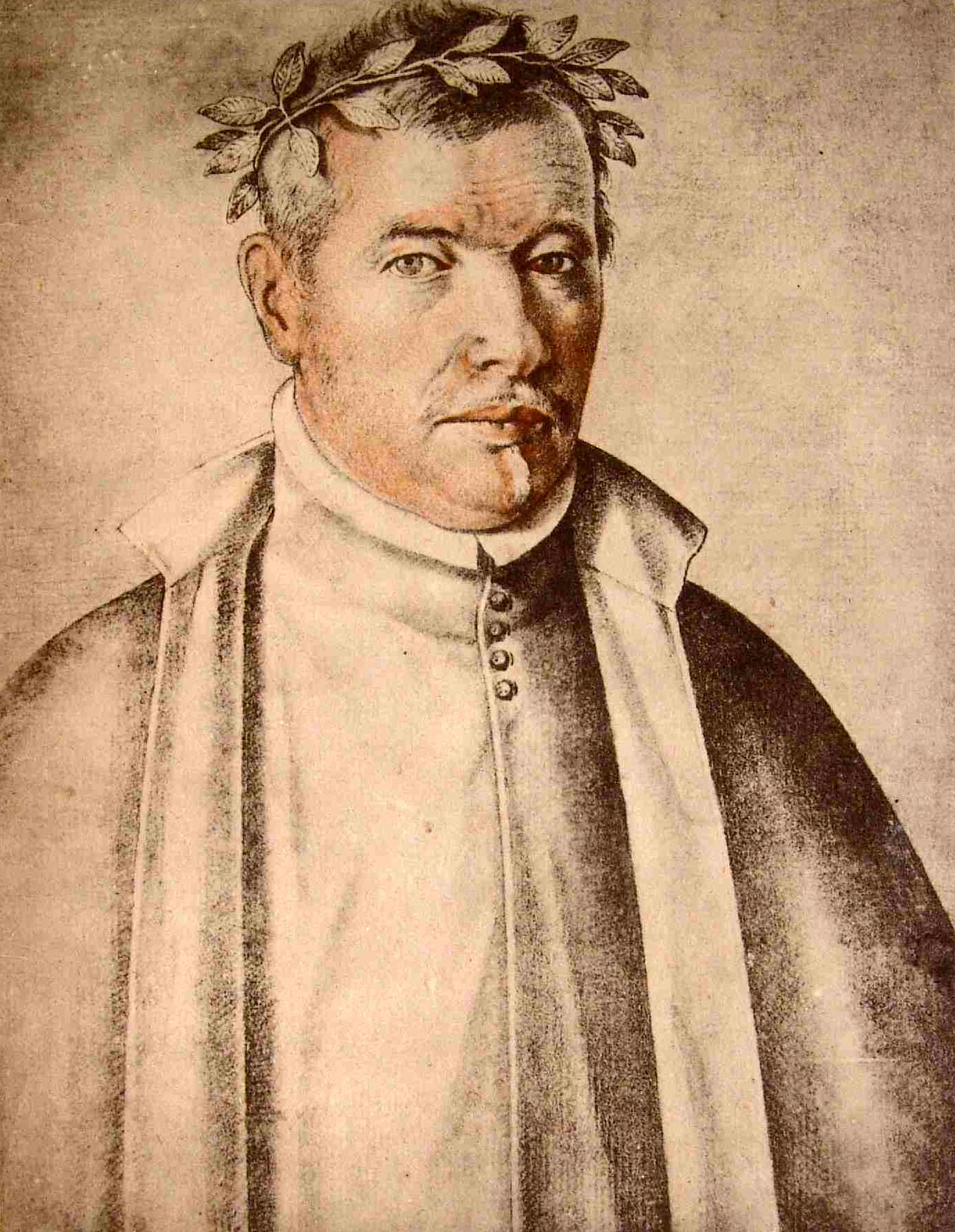
- Rodrigo Caro
- Born: 4 October 1573; Utrera, Spain
- Died: 10 August 1647 (aged 73); Seville, Spain
- Occupations: Catholic priest, antiquarian, art collector, writer
- Known for: Canción a las ruinas de Itálica
- Parent(s): Bernabé Sánchez and Francisca Caro

Academic background
- Education: University of Osuna; University of Seville

Academic work
- Discipline: Ancient history, Classical archaeology

Rodrigo Caro (4 October 1573, in Utrera – 10 August 1647 in Seville) was a Spanish priest, historian, archeologist, lawyer, poet and writer. Caro is famous for his poem on the ruins of the ancient Roman settlement of Italica, near Seville. Its fine rhetorical sweep derives from Herrera and is unaffected by Gongorist mannerism.

== Biography ==
Rodrigo Caro came from a family of the lesser nobility. He studied canon law at the University of Osuna and obtained his degree at the University of Seville in 1596. Shortly afterwards he took holy orders and embarked on a career with the archbishopric of Seville. His life was uneventful, except for petty squabbles with other clerics and a brief banishment to Portugal in 1632 on account of a dispute with the king’s tax collectors.

Caro was passionately interested in antiquity. Around 1595, when still a student at the University of Seville, he visited the ruins of the nearby Roman town of Italica. This inspired a poem, Canción a las ruinas de Itálica, in which he expressed his sorrow at the transience of greatness. Through these interests he became acquainted with men of letters in Seville in the circle of the painter and art theorist Francisco Pacheco (a group often misleadingly referred to as an 'academy'). Its members included the poets Francisco de Rioja and Fernando de Herrera, humanists and historians such as Juan de Robles (1574–1649) and Tomás Tamayo de Vargas (1588–1641) and such aristocrats as the erudite Fernando Afán de Ribera, 3rd Duke of Alcalá de los Gazules.

Caro dedicated to Alcalá his Relación de las inscripciones y antigüedad de la villa de Utrera (1622) and to Alcalá’s son, the Marqués de Tarifa, Días geniales o lúdicros (first pubd 1884). These works are antiquarian studies showing profound scholarship. Caro’s position as visiting judge of the archbishopric enabled him to travel extensively within his jurisdiction and to gather first-hand information about coins, inscriptions and other antiquities. As his letters reveal, there was established a network of like-minded friends who shared their discoveries.

Caro appears to have been partly motivated by an intense local patriotism and his aim to prove the antiquity and greatness of Utrera. His enthusiasm led to his deception by the forgeries of the Jesuit Jerónimo Román de la Higuera, author of the apocryphal 'Chronicals' of Dextrus and Maximus, which Caro himself edited in 1627.

Caro’s own works, such as Antigüedades y principado de la ilustrissima ciudad de Sevilla (1634), with the Adiciones (first pubd 1932), are scholarly and provide valuable information for modern archaeologists. He often mentioned his own collection in his writings; it was divided between his house at Utrera, where he kept the sculptures and larger pieces, and Seville, where he kept the coins, medals and smaller bronzes; it was apparently dispersed after his death. He made numerous gifts to other collectors in Seville, including the Duque de Arcos (1602–72) and Sancho Hurtado de la Puente.

Caro’s late years were marked by poor health and disappointment that he did not receive anticipated favours through Francisco de Rioja, librarian to the all-powerful Prime Minister, the Conde Duque de Olivares.

== Works ==
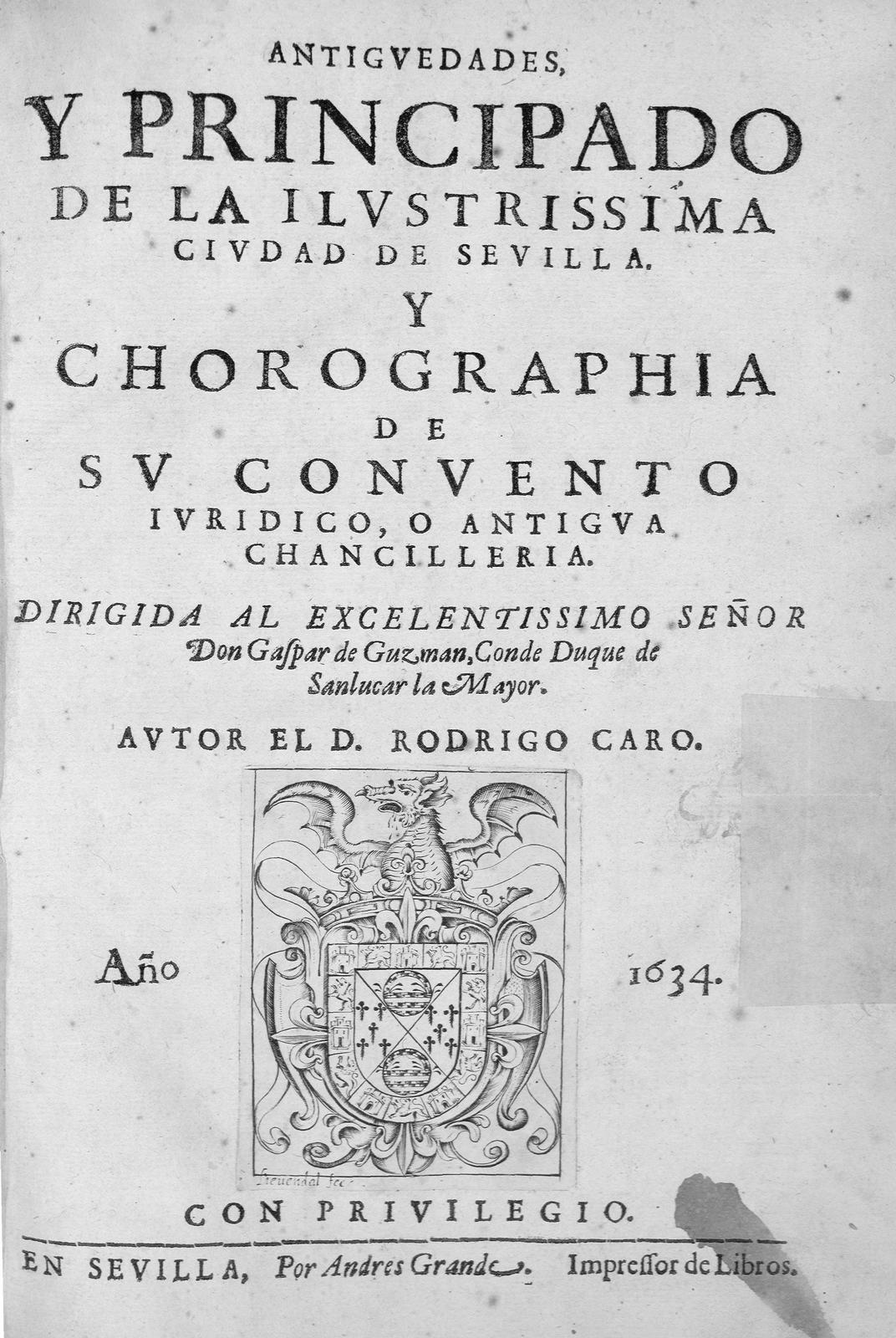
Antigüedades y principado de la illustrissima Ciudad de Sevilla. Seville: A. Grande. 1634

His principal works include:

- Antigüedades y principado de la illustrissima Ciudad de Sevilla, y chorographia de su convento juridico, o antigua chancilleria. Seville: A. Grande. 1634.
- Relación de las inscripciones y antigüedad de la villa de Utrera. Osuna: Juan Serrano de Vargas Urueña. 1622.
- Flavii Lucii Dextri Omnimodae historiae quae extant fragmenta. Chronicle falsely attributed to Flavio Lucio Dexter, Elecano, and San Braulion. Seville: apud Clavigium. 1627.
- Días geniales o lúdicros. Seville: El Mercantil Sevillano. 1884.
- Santiago Montoto, ed. (1915). Varones insignes en letras naturales de la ilustrísima ciudad de Sevilla [y] Epistolario. Seville: Real Academia Sevillana de Buenas Letras.
- Adiciones al principado y antigüedades de la ciudad de Sevilla y su Convento Jurídico. Seville: Impr. Alemana. 1932.

=== Manuscript works ===
- Veterum Hispaniae deorum manes sive reliquiae;
- De los nombres y sitios de los vientos [Of the names and places of the winds];
- De los santos de Sevilla;
- Del principado de Cordova;
- De la antigüedad del appellido Caro [Of the antiquity of the surname Caro]. Dedicated to Don Fernando Caro, Governor of Carmona.
