= El Coronil =

El Coronil, Spain
- city
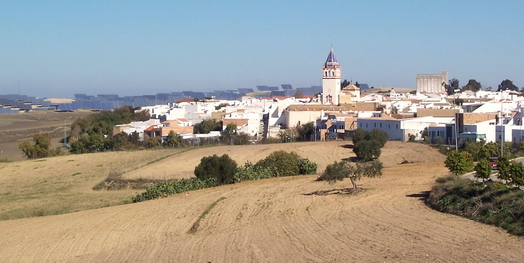
- Panoramic view of El Coronil

- Flag Coat of arms
- Interactive map of El Coronil, Spain
- Coordinates: 37°05′N 5°38′W
- Country: Spain
- Province: Seville
- Municipality: El Coronil

Area
  - Total: 92 km^{2} (36 sq mi)
- Elevation: 117 m (384 ft)

Population (2025-01-01)
  - Total: 4,659
  - Density: 51/km^{2} (130/sq mi)
- Time zone: UTC+1 (CET)
  - Summer (DST): UTC+2 (CEST)

El Coronil is a city located in the province of Seville, Spain. According to the 2005 census (INE), the city has a population of 5044 inhabitants.

== See also ==
- List of municipalities in Seville
