= Los Molares =

Los Molares, Spain
- city
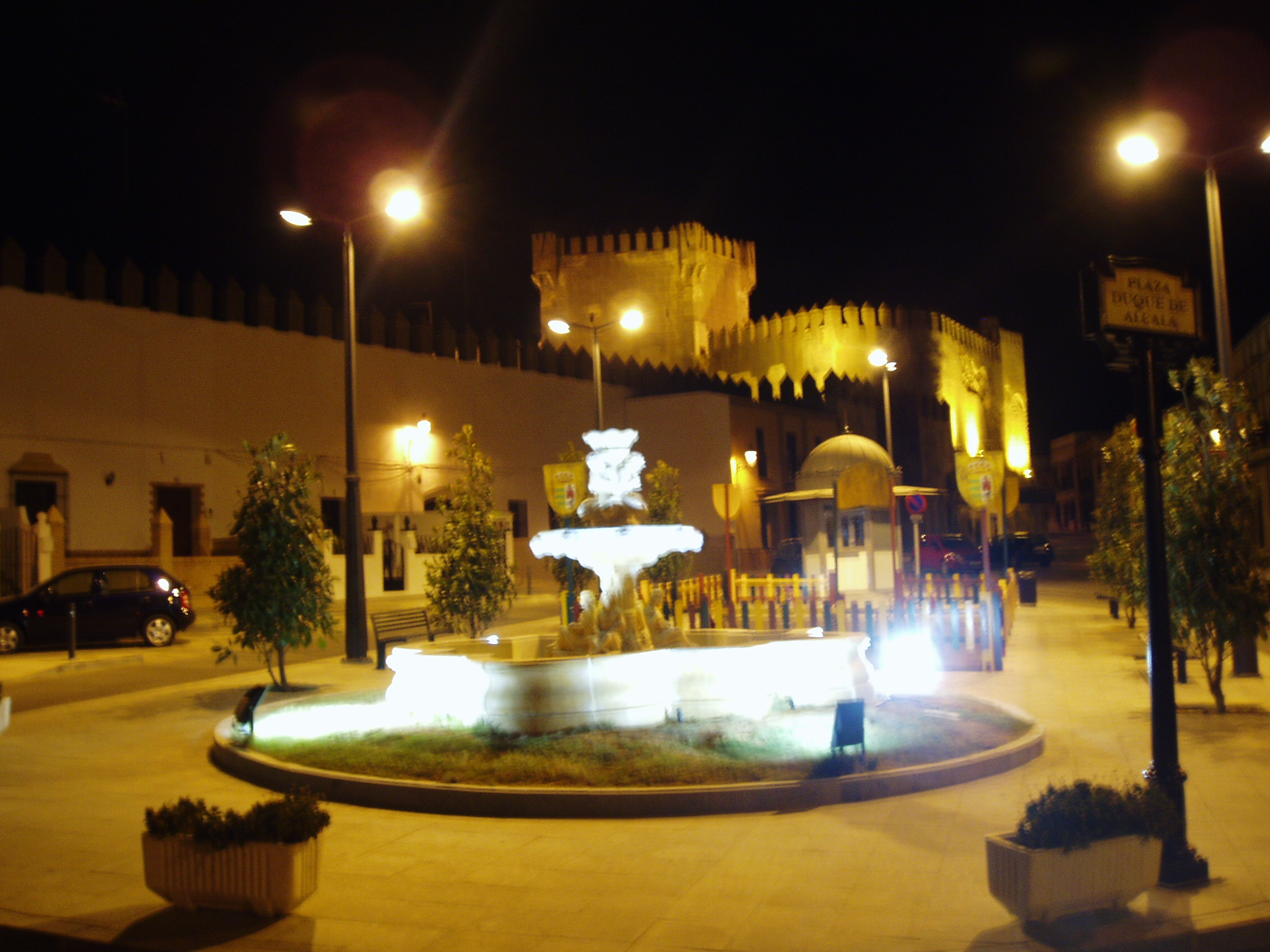
- Los Molares at night

- Flag Coat of arms
- Interactive map of Los Molares, Spain
- Coordinates: 37°09′N 5°43′W
- Country: Spain
- Province: Seville
- Municipality: Los Molares

Area
  - Total: 43 km^{2} (17 sq mi)
- Elevation: 73 m (240 ft)

Population (2025-01-01)
  - Total: 3,659
  - Density: 85/km^{2} (220/sq mi)
- Time zone: UTC+1 (CET)
  - Summer (DST): UTC+2 (CEST)

Los Molares is a city located in the province of Seville, Spain. According to the 2005 census (INE), the city has a population of 2,874 inhabitants. This town was the birthplace of Pablo Garcia Albano (1576 - 1639), priest and historian.

== See also ==
- List of municipalities in Seville
