= Las Cabezas de San Juan =

Municipality in Andalusia, Spain

Las Cabezas de San Juan Ramón
- Municipality
- Las Cabezas de San Juan
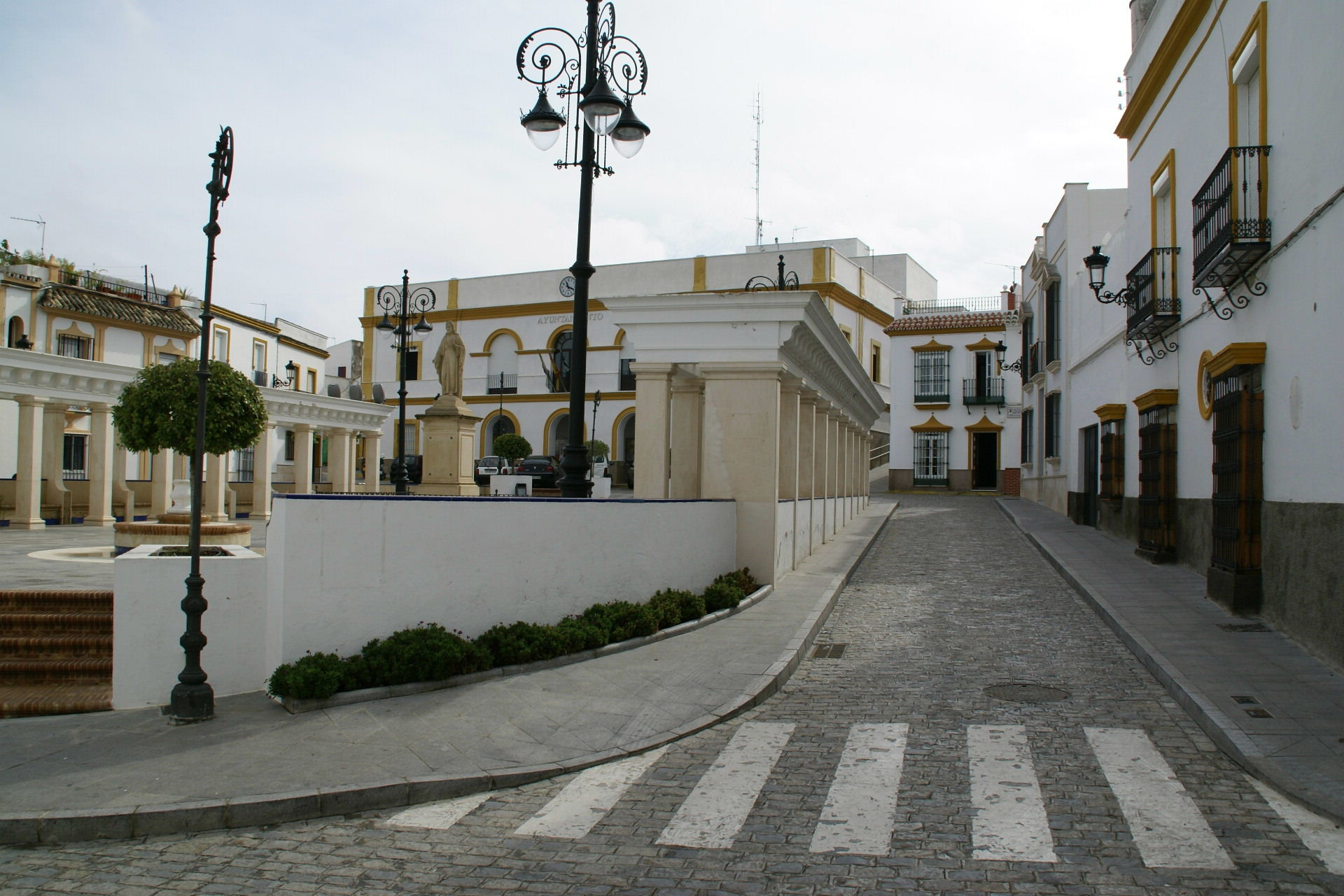
- Plaza de la Constitución, Las Cabezas de San Juan (Andalusia), Spain

- Flag Coat of arms

- Location in Spain
- Coordinates: 36°58′54″N 5°56′26″W
- Country: Spain
- Autonomous community: Andalusia
- Province: Seville
- Comarca: Lower Guadalquivir

Government
  - Alcalde: Francisco Toajas Mellado (PSOE)

Area
  - Total: 229.70 km^{2} (88.69 sq mi)
- Elevation: 76 m (249 ft)

Population (2025-01-01)
  - Total: 16,388
  - Density: 71.345/km^{2} (184.78/sq mi)
- Time zone: UTC+1 (CET)
  - Summer (DST): UTC+2 (CEST)
- Postal code: 41730
- Official language(s): Spanish
- Website: www.lascabezasdesanjuan.es

Las Cabezas de San Juan (Spanish: Saint John's Hillocks) is a village and municipality located in the Bajo Guadalquivir (Spanish: Lower Guadalquivir) comarca, in Seville province, Andalusia, Spain. According to the 2009 census (INE), the village has a population of 16,464 inhabitants. Famous people from Las Cabezas de San Juan include World Cup-winning footballer Carlos Marchena.

== See also ==
- List of municipalities in Seville
