= Olivares =

Olivares may refer to:

== Places ==
- Olivares, Spain, a municipality in Seville province, Spain
- Olivares de Júcar, a municipality in Cuenca province, Spain
- Olivares de Duero, a municipality in Valladolid, province, Spain
- Olivares River, in Chile

== People with the surname ==
- House of Olivares, a Spanish noble house
  - Pedro Pérez de Guzmán, 1st Count of Olivares
  - Enrique de Guzmán, 2nd Count of Olivares (1540–1607)
  - Gaspar de Guzmán, Count-Duke of Olivares (1587–1645), Spanish statesman
  - Enrique Felipe de Guzmán, 2nd Count-Duke of Olivares
- Adolfo Olivares (1940–2025), Chilean footballer
- Alfredo Olivares (born 1991), Filipino baseball player
- Amanda Olivares (born 1966), Mexican beauty pageant winner
- Antonio de Olivares (1630–1722), Spanish Franciscan
- Carlos Olivares (born 1952), Chilean politician
- Christopher Olivares (born 1999), Peruvian footballer, son of Percy Olivares
- Daniel Olivares (cyclist) (born 1940), Filipino cyclist
- Daniel Olivares (politician) (born 1981), Peruvian politician
- Davide Olivares (born 1971), Italian footballer
- Ed Olivares (1938–2022), Puerto Rican baseball player
- Edgar Olivares (born 1977), Bolivian footballer
- Edward Olivares (born 1996), Venezuelan baseball player
- Élodie Olivarès (born 1976), French athlete
- Fausto Olivares (1940–1995), Spanish painter
- Fito Olivares (1947–2023), Mexican musician
- Flaviano Olivares (1911-1997), Filipino military officer
- Francisco José Olivares (1778–1854), Spanish composer and organist
- Gerardo Olivares (born 1964), Spanish filmmaker
- Héctor Enrique Olivares (1958−2019), Argentine politician
- Iván Olivares (born 1961), Venezuelan basketball player
- Ivette Olivares (born 1997) Chilean football and futsal player
- Jácome de Olivares (fl.1540–fl.1571), Portuguese merchant and spy
- Javier Olivares (born 1987), Chilean journalist and politician
- Jesus Olivares (born 1998), American powerlifter
- Jonathan Olivares (born 1981), American industrial designer and author
- Joe Olivares (1906–?), Cuban baseball player
- José Olivares (born 1997), Dominican tennis player
- José Manuel Olivares (born 1985), Venezuelan politician
- Juan Olivares (born 1941), Chilean footballer
- Juan Manuel Olivares (1760–1797), Venezuelan composer
- Julián de Olivares (1895–1977), Spanish fencer
- Laureano Olivares (born 1978), Venezuelan actor
- Lesly Olivares (born 2000), Chilean footballer
- Luis Olivares (1939–2024), Chilean footballer
- Marcello Olivares (born 2001), American fencer
- Manuel Olivares (1909–1976), Spanish football player and manager
- Maritza Olivares, Mexican actress
- Melani Olivares (born 1973), Spanish actress
- Michelle Olivares (born 2002), Chilean footballer
- Miguel de Olivares (1675–1768), Chilean Jesuit and historian
- Omar Olivares (born 1967), Puerto Rican baseball player
- Oswaldo Olivares (born 1953), Venezuelan baseball player
- Pablo Olivares (1965–2014), Spanish screenwriter and producer
- Percy Olivares (born 1968), Peruvian footballer
- Raúl Olivares (born 1988), Chilean footballer
- René Olivares (1946–2025), Chilean painter and designer
- Richard Olivares (born 1978), Chilean footballer
- Rodrigo Olivares (born 1976), Chilean swimmer
- Roger Olivares, Filipino author
- Rubén Olivares (born 1947), Mexican professional boxer
