= Laelia (city) =

Ancient Tartessian city in southern Spain

Laelia was an ancient city located in the Cerro de la Cabeza near Olivares in the Province of Seville, Spain. Originally a Tartessian settlement, it was named Laelia by Roman settlers in the 2nd century BC. It was described by Pliny the Elder in his Natural History as lying on the Menoba River (Guadiamar) near the towns of Olontigi and Lastigi. These three cities had their own mints and, thus, are well attested from numismatic evidence. Their exact location, however, has not been definitively established. All three were probably located relatively close to Aznalcóllar, where the materials for their coins were probably mined. The settlement at the Cerro de la Cabeza, populated until the 13th century, most likely corresponds to Laelia given the archaeological evidence obtained from excavations in 1981.

After Pliny, Ptolemy mentioned the city (Lailia) as a settlement by the Turdetani. No other classical accounts of the city have survived. In 1634, Rodrigo Caro proposed Aracena as the location for Laelia according to Ptolemy's indications, and in 1754 Enrique Flórez proposed Berrocal, also in the Province of Huelva. Based on Pliny's and Ptolemy's accounts, Juan Agustín Ceán Bermúdez (1832), Antonio Delgado (1871) and Rodrigo Amador de los Ríos (1891) agreed on a location in or near Sanlúcar la Mayor, suggesting the Cortijo de la Pisana (or Pizana), located between Gerena and Olivares. Both Ceán Bermúdez and Sebastián Miñano, in his geographical dictionary, mention also Albaida, closer to Olivares, as a possible site, despite the lack of archaeological evidence for a settlement in that locality.
