= Olivares, Spain =

Coordinates: 37°25′N 6°09′W

Olivares
- city
- Flag Coat of arms
- Interactive map of Olivares
- Country: Spain
- Autonomous community: Andalusia
- Province: Seville
- Comarca: Aljarafe
- Municipality: Olivares

Area
  - Total: 46 km^{2} (18 sq mi)
- Elevation: 169 m (554 ft)

Population (2025-01-01)
  - Total: 9,537
  - Density: 210/km^{2} (540/sq mi)
- Time zone: UTC+1 (CET)
  - Summer (DST): UTC+2 (CEST)

Olivares is a city located in the Province of Seville, Spain. According to the 2016 census (INE), the city has a population of 9480 inhabitants. It is located in the Aljarafe, the comarca downstream of the Guadalquivir and west of Seville. It borders Albaida to the west, Gerena to the north, Salteras to the east, and Sanlúcar la Mayor and Villanueva del Ariscal to the south. After the establishment of the House of Olivares, it grew in size and influence, becoming an important urban center in the Aljarafe.

== History ==
Olivares is located in the region of Tartessos, one of the oldest documented cultures in Europe. Several Bronze and Iron Age tells are found in the area, such as the Cerro de las Cabezas, which is thought to correspond to the ancient city of Laelia mentioned by Pliny and Ptolemy. These settlements lay on the Guadiamar (the Roman Menoba), which may have been navigable during ancient times according to Pliny. Thus, cities such as Laelia and Lastigi probably acted as port cities or trade posts. During Roman times, the region was connected to the main aqueduct that brought water from Tejada to Itálica.

The village of Olivares was founded as a small alquería on the Repudio, a brook that carries rainwater to the Guadalquivir. This village was known as Estercolinas or Estercolines, perhaps from an older Latin name, Turculina. This was later known as villa de olivares (town of olive fields), whence its name. Olive trees have been grown in this area for centuries and represent one of the main sources of income in the area, apart from other crops, mainly cereals. Over time, Olivares grew in size, becoming bigger than the nearby town of Albaida. The nearby town of Heliche became depopulated in the early 19th century and was dismantled in 1843. Its inhabitants moved to Olivares, while the building materials of its church (Iglesia de San Benito) were used to build the cemetery in Olivares (Cementerio de San Benito).

The city is known for the House of Olivares, founded by Pedro Pérez de Guzmán in 1535. At the time, its population was approximately 240, of which 67 paid taxes. In 1625, Gaspar de Guzmán became the first Count-Duke of Olivares, i.e. Count of Olivares and Duke of Sanlúcar. The noble family later merged with the House of Alba, which inherited all of its lands, before selling part of these in the first half of the 19th century. The Duchess of Alba still owns La Pizana, a cortijo between Olivares and Gerena.

By 1751, Olivares had over 1,600 inhabitants, which grew to 1,950 by 1801 and reached 2,943 by 1888. The city had only 12 streets and one square in 1781, a small number compared to the 150 streets it had in the 21st century. In 1998, a chemical spill from the nearby Mina de los Frailes, in Aznalcóllar, caused an environmental disaster in the Guadiamar river. This led to the creation of a wildlife corridor that runs from Gerena to Aznalcázar, the Corredor Verde del Guadiamar.

== Cortijos ==
The lands around Olivares are divided into a series of fincas and cortijos which originally constituted a large dehesa with encinas (Quercus ilex). These have been mostly transformed into lands of agricultural use, primarily olive fields, as well as wheat, cotton and corn fields. According to Pascual Madoz, "over 6,000 of the 7,000 aranzadas [ca. 3,000 ha] of Olivares were owned by the Dukedom, now joined to the House of Berwick & Alba. These lands were mostly sold in the 19th century due to the delicate financial situation of the House of Alba and the high tax burden. The following cortijos, documented in the 19th century, but many much older, exist today:

- La Coriana, north of Olivares and west of Heliche; in 1801, its caserío was dismantled by the House of Alba and the land distributed among nearby villagers; known for its fountain, it lends its name to the nearby Arroyo de la Coriana
- Montijos, near Heliche; mainly planted with olive trees
- La Bartola, between La Coriana and Salteras; one of the many lands of the House of Alba
- Bonal, next to the Guadiamar, south of San Antonio; also owned by the House of Alba
- Soberbina (or Sobarbina), south of the confluence of the Agrio and Guadiamar; one of the oldest and largest cortijos in the area
- San Antonio, next to the Guadiamar; one of the largest, established in modern times, it lends its name to the Torre de San Antonio (the medieval Torre del Alpechín)
- Conti, north of San Antonio and next to La Pizana; the Olivares–Gerena road runs through its caserío
- La Alegría (formerly divided into the Casa de Vacas or Dehesa de las Vacas, Cerro de las Esparragueras and Cabo del Río), between the Agrio and Guadiamar; formerly a dehesa owned by Concha y Sierra, now agricultural land

The following cortijos, while not within the término municipal of Olivares, are historically connected to the others:

- Cambullón, a historical alquería west of La Coriana; it belongs to Albaida
- Dehesa de Crispín (or Crespín), on the confluence of the Guadiamar and the Agrio, the latter of which used to be known as Arroyo Crispinejo (or Crespinejo); it belongs to Sanlúcar la Mayor
- Carcahueso (or Carcabosillo), northwest of La Alegría; formerly a dehesa owned by Concha y Sierra, now agricultural land; it belongs to Sanlúcar la Mayor
- Las Dueñas, west of Carcahueso, towards Aznalcóllar; it contains the remains of the Tejada aqueduct, as do Carcahueso, La Alegría, San Antonio and La Pizana; it belongs to Sanlúcar la Mayor
- La Pizana (or La Pisana), north of Conti and next to Gerena; it contains the country house of the Duchess of Alba; it belongs to Gerena
- Mirandilla (or Mirandillas), north of Carcahueso and La Pizana; still a dehesa with bulls owned by the Marquis of Albaserrada; it belongs to Gerena

== Gallery ==
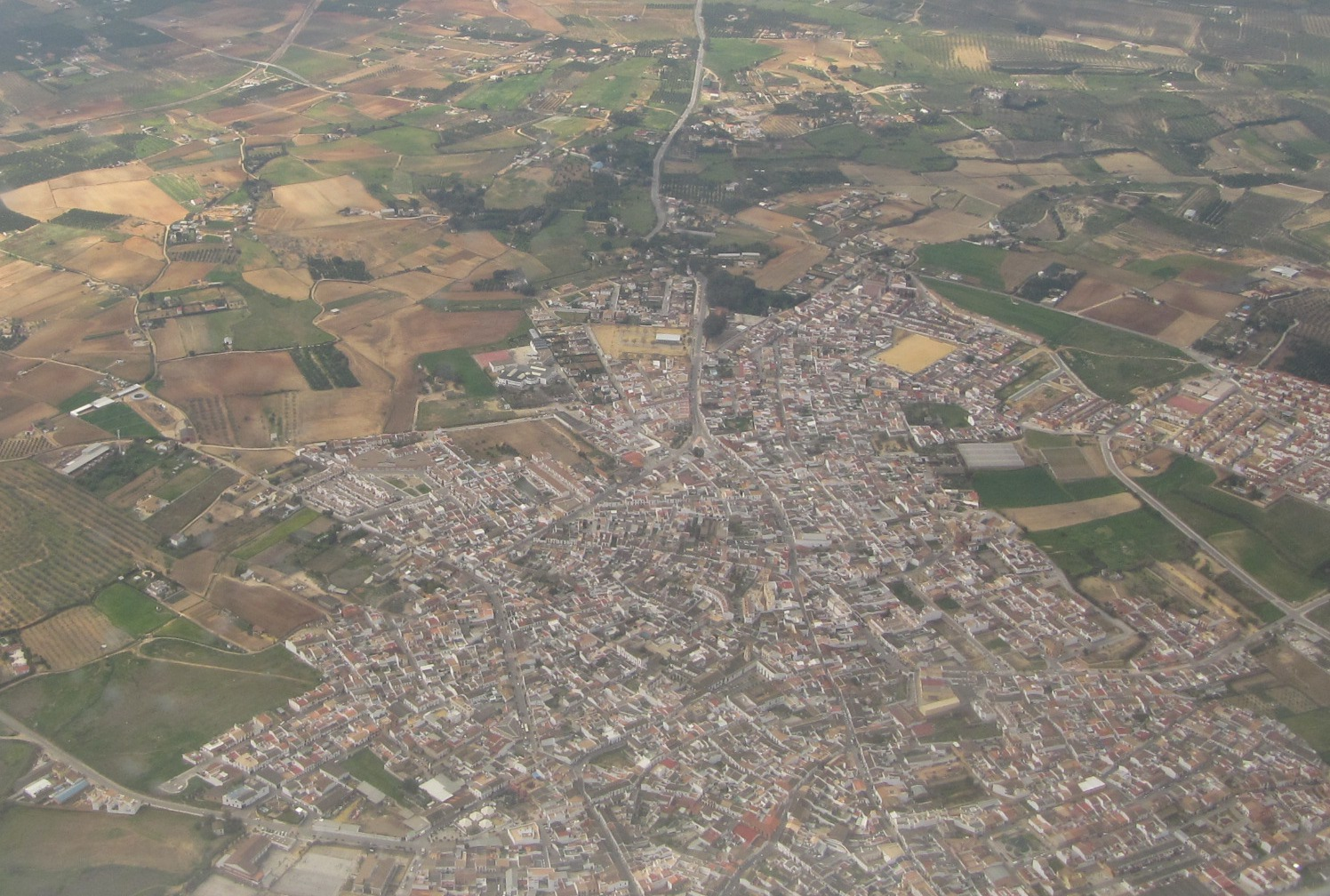
Aerial view of Olivares

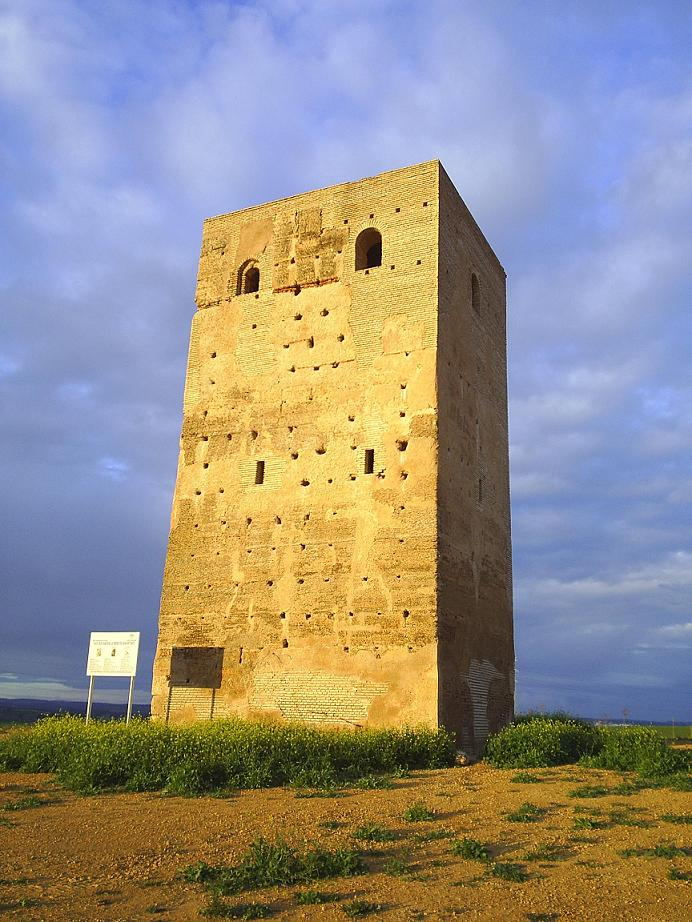
San Antonio Tower, on the road to Gerena

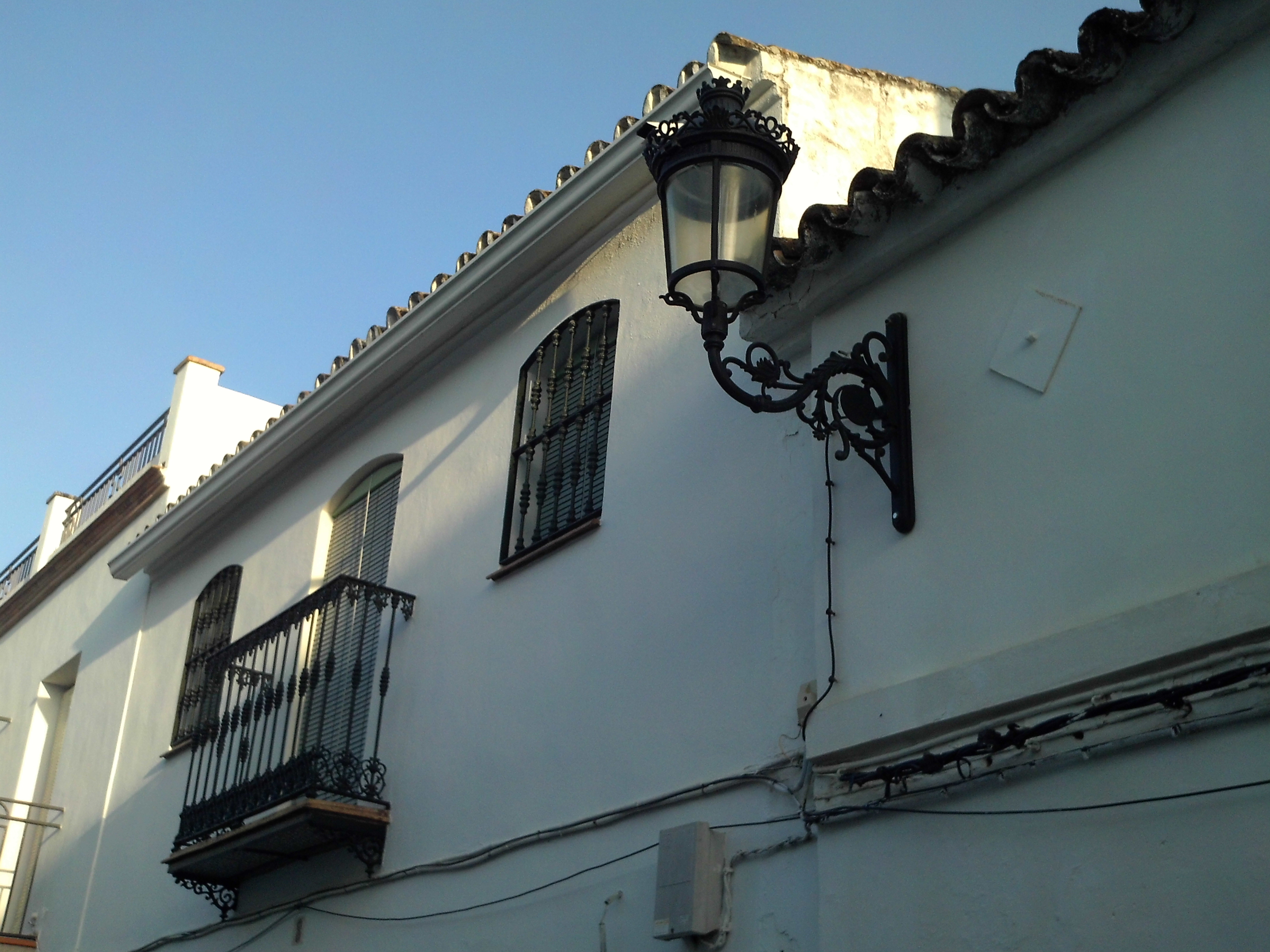
Houses in Olivares

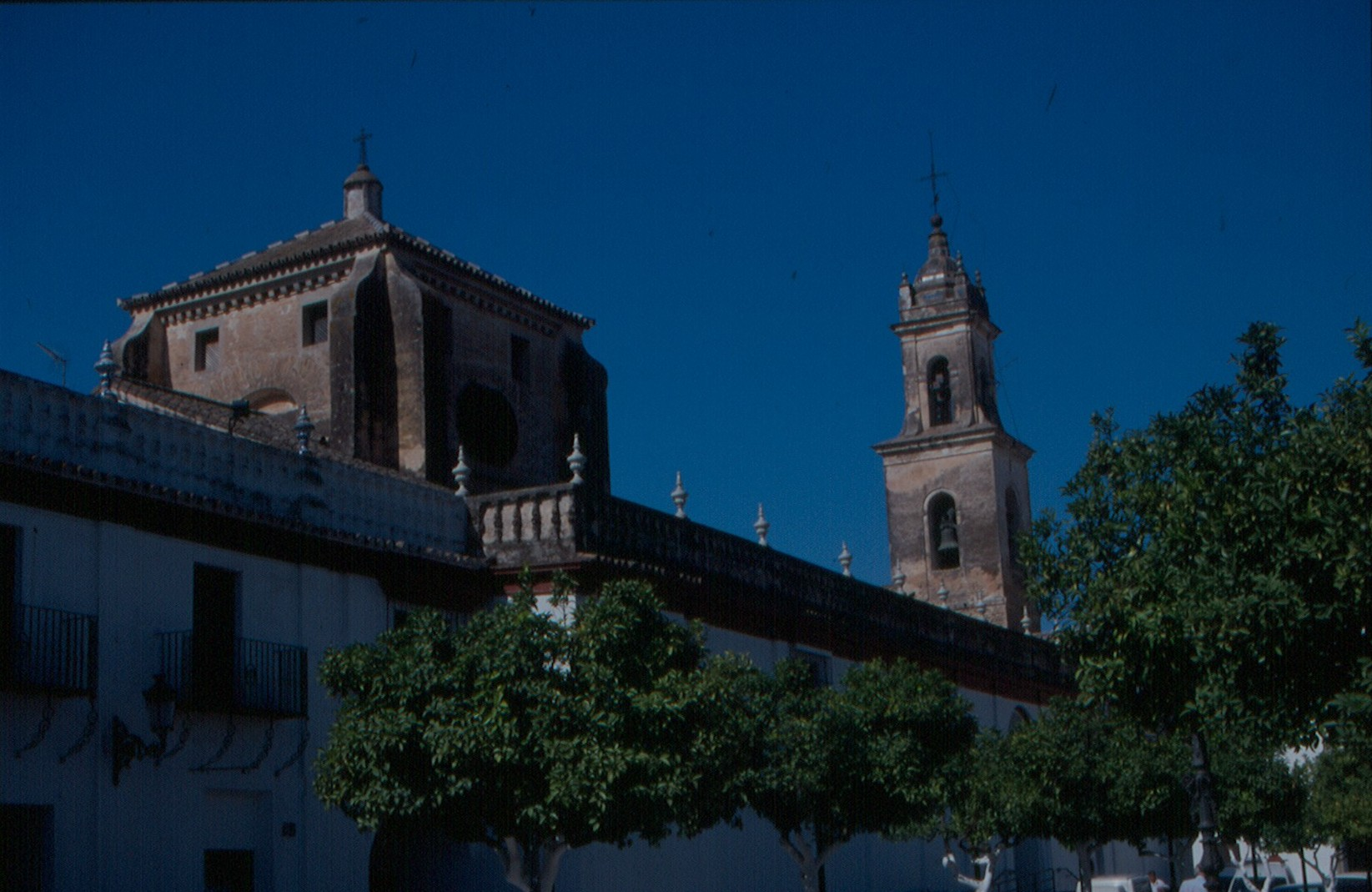
Santa María de las Nieves Church

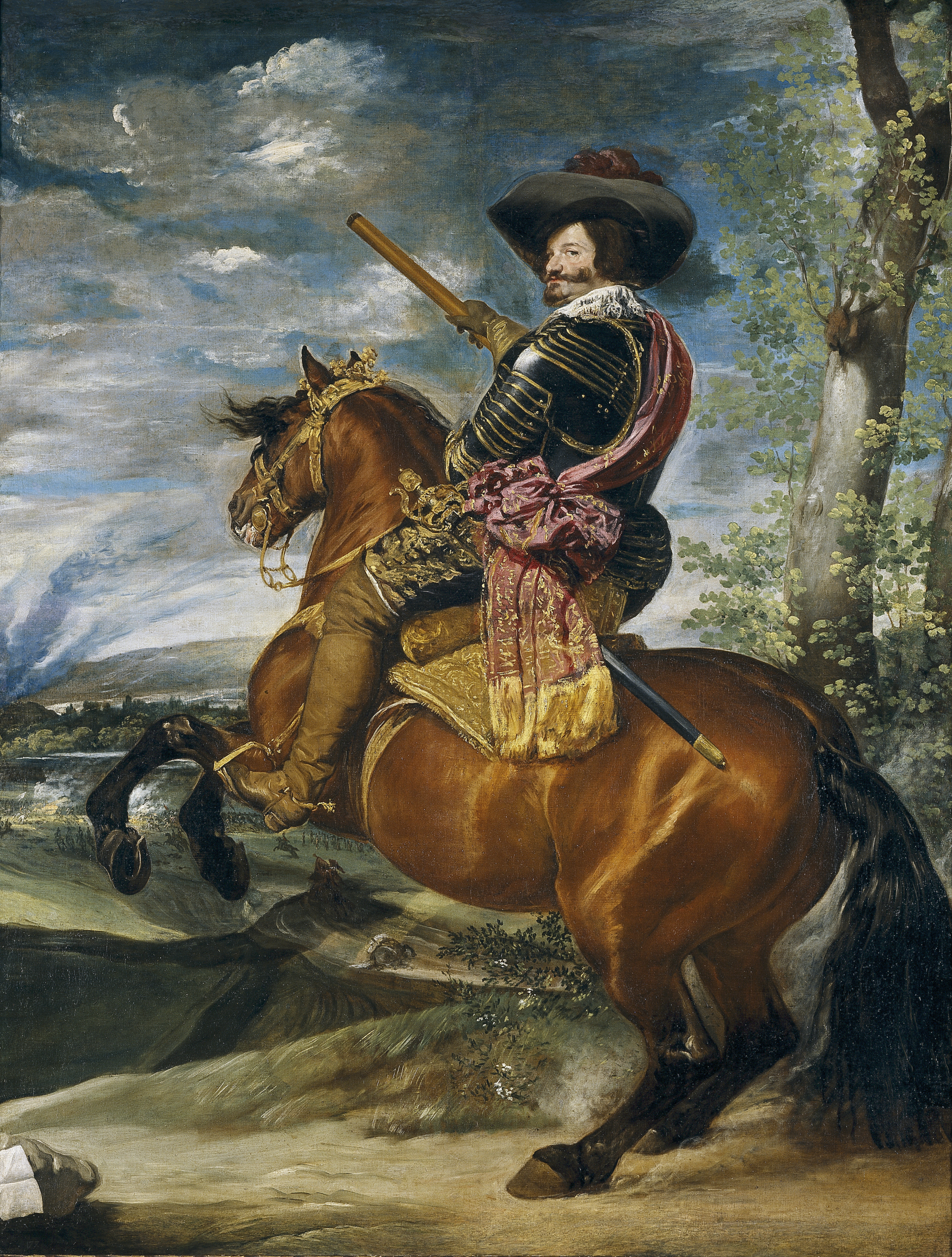
Gaspar de Guzmán, Count-Duke of Olivares, as portrayed by Diego Velázquez

== See also ==
- List of municipalities in Seville
