= Laelia (disambiguation) =

Laelia is a genus of orchids from Central and South America.

Laelia may also refer to:

== Science ==
- Laelia (moth), a genus of moths
- Philhedra laelia (also known as Crania laelia and Petrocrania laelia), a species of extinct brachiopod in the Craniidae family
- Laelia, a crater on the minor planet Vesta

== History ==
- Laelia (city), ancient Roman city in southern Hispania
- Laelia (gens), a noble family from Ancient Rome
- Laelia, a vestal virgin of Ancient Rome
- Laelia Quinta, Roman noblewoman married to Lucius Subrius Felix of the Subria gens
- Aelia Laelia Crispis, a famous tombstone in Bologna, Italy

== See also ==
- Aelia (disambiguation)
