= Lastigi =

Ancient Tartessian city in southern Spain

Lastigi was an ancient Tartessian city in southern Spain, settled by the Romans in the 2nd century BC. It is mentioned by Pliny the Elder in his Natural History as lying on the Menoba River (Guadiamar) near the towns of Laelia and Olontigi. He mentions it again as a town in the Celtic region, whose boundaries are not clear, but may extend from Málaga to the Guadiana. Its exact location has been debated by historians since the 19th century. The following sites have been proposed, in chronological order:

- Zahara de la Sierra, in the Sierra de Grazalema, Province of Cádiz; proposed by Rodrigo Caro, on the basis of Pliny's second mention of the town in the same list as Arunda (Ronda), Acinipo, etc. However, the same list includes Aruci and Turobriga, near Portugal.
- Castuera, Badajoz; proposed by Miguel Cortés y López, on the basis of Pliny's second list, despite its broad range.
- On the Guadiamar, near Aznalcóllar; proposed by Antonio Delgado, who suggested downstream sites for Laelia (Cortijo de la Pisana or Pizana) and Olontigi (Aznalcázar).
- The coast of Huelva; proposed by Francisco Mateos Gago.
- Dehesa de Crespín (or Crispín), west of the confluence of the Agrio and Guadiamar rivers, between Aznalcóllar and Olivares; proposed by historian Juan Cuveiro Piñol, on the basis of Pliny's first mention of the Menoba river.
- Cerro de la Cabeza, near Olivares, proposed by numismatic researcher Leandre Villaronga, but this site most likely corresponds to Laelia.
- Los Merineros, near Aznalcóllar, a Roman settlement which has been researched as a potential site since the 1930s.
- Dehesa de la Sierra, near Aznalcóllar, about 3 km east of Tejada la Vieja, a large area of ruins found by Juan Antonio Figueras in 2009 and verified by LiDAR by Manuel Hidalgo in 2022. As of 2024, scholarly consensus is that this is the most likely site.

The idea that Pliny might have referred to two towns with the same name is generally rejected. Numismatic evidence places Lastigi near Laelia and Olontigi and rejects the hypotheses of Zahara and Castuera. The ore-rich area around Aznalcóllar and the navigability of the Guadiamar support the notion that these cities lie in this region along the river.
