= Portrait of the Count-Duke of Olivares =

Portrait of the Count-Duke of Olivares may refer to

- Equestrian portrait of Duke de Olivares
- Portrait of the Count-Duke of Olivares (Hermitage)
- Portrait of the Count-Duke of Olivares (São Paulo)
