= Guadiamar =

Coordinates: 36°54′12″N 6°20′05″W

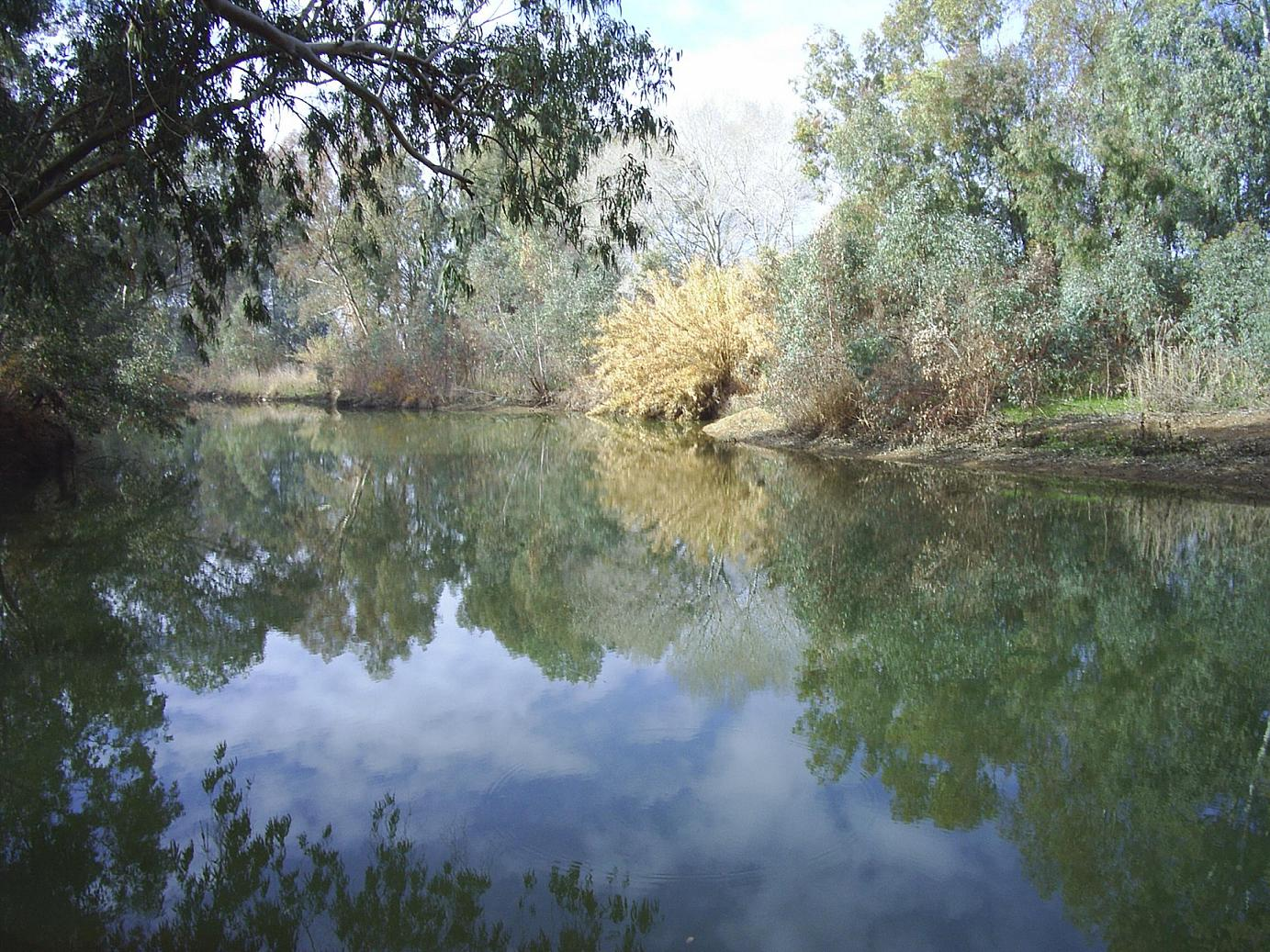
- Guadiamar near Sanlúcar la Mayor.

Location
- Autonomous community: Andalusia

The Guadiamar is a river of Andalusia, Spain, and a tributary of the Guadalquivir. Its course runs entirely within the Province of Seville, flowing from Sierra Morena through the eastern border of Doñana National Park. Its source is in Dehesa del Moral in Zufre, and the river goes through Gerena, Sanlúcar la Mayor, Olivares, Benacazón and Aznalcázar.

The river's water system is managed by the Confederación Hidrográfica del Guadalquivir.

== Mining disaster ==
On 25 April 1998, the company Boliden AB was responsible for a major ecological disaster in Spain, when a reservoir of toxic waste near the town of Aznalcóllar, owned by its subsidiary Boliden-Apirsa, broke and spilled its contents into the Agrio River, the main tributary of the Guadiamar. Both rivers became severally contaminated with heavy metals. To recover the ecological diversity of the area, the Corredor Verde del Guadiamar was created, a wildlife corridor which connects Sierra Morena with Doñana.

== See also ==
- List of rivers of Spain
