= Portrait of the Count-Duke of Olivares (Hermitage) =

1635 painting by Diego Velázquez

Portrait of Count Duke de Olivares
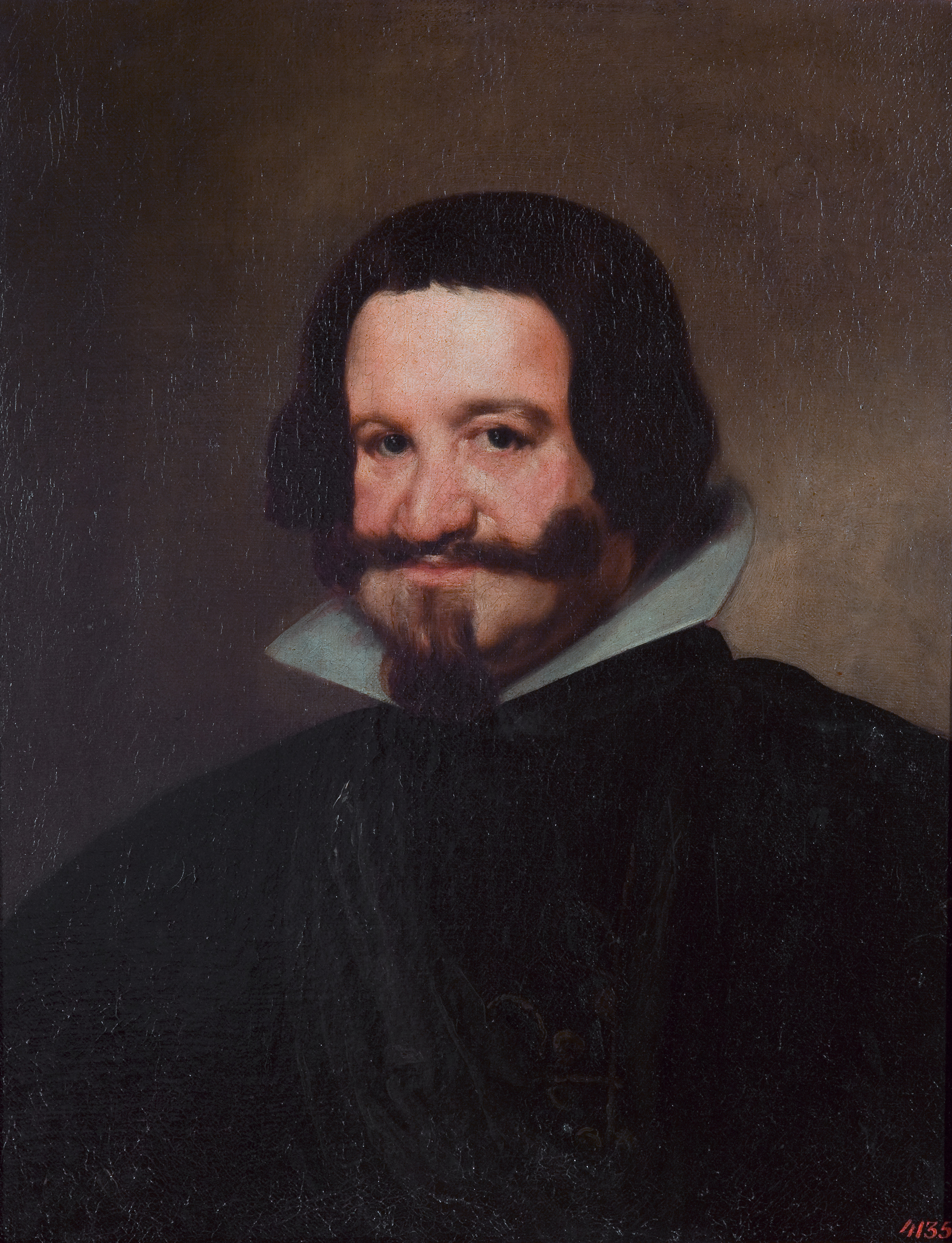
- Artist: Diego Velázquez
- Year: 1635
- Medium: Oil on canvas
- Dimensions: 67 cm × 54.5 cm (26 in × 21.5 in)
- Location: Hermitage Museum; St. Petersburg

The Portrait of Count-Duke de Olivares is a painting by Spanish artist Diego Velázquez, finished in 1635. It is housed in the Hermitage Museum of St. Petersburg.

The picture portrays Gaspar de Guzmán, Count-Duke of Olivares, Prime Minister of Spain during the reign of Philip IV. He is portrayed in half bust over a neutral background, the face appearing tired and swollen, markedly aged from the previous, more famous equestrian portrait of Duke de Olivares also by Velázquez. Olivares wears a simple black dress with a white ruff.

== See also ==
- List of works by Diego Velázquez
