= Lope Conchillos y Quintana =

Spanish politician

Lope Conchillos y Quintana (? - 1521 in Toledo) was a Spanish politician and secretary at the court of King Ferdinand "the Catholic". He married María Niño de Ribera, cousin of the Duke of Infantado.

He was awarded an absentee encomienda in Puerto Rico. In the Crónicas de Arecibo written by Puerto Rican historian Cayetano Coll y Toste, Toste states that his research and investigations led him to uncover the following facts. In the year 1515, the area of Arecibo, including the rivers of "Rio Grande" and "Tanama", was given as a gift to Lope Conchillos (who resided in Spain) by the Spanish Crown. Conchillos sent a helper by the name of "Pedro Moreno" to the island to administer his lands; Moreno found Aracibo and his tribe of about 200 Taínos living in the land; he then enslaved them, and Aracibo and his people died shortly after.

He was an enemy of Bartolomé de Las Casas, and father in law to Pedro Nuñez de Guzmán by his daughter Francisca de Ribera Niño.
