= Pedro Aranaz =

Spanish composer

Pedro Aranaz y Vides (1742–1821) was a Spanish composer and music theorist. Some of his works are preserved in the El Escorial archive. With his organist and former student Francisco José Olivares, he also co-authored a notable treatise on music theory, the Plan completo de composición fundamental.

== Works, editions, recordings ==
- tonadilla: La maja limonera.
