= Soledad Cabezón Ruiz =

Spanish politician

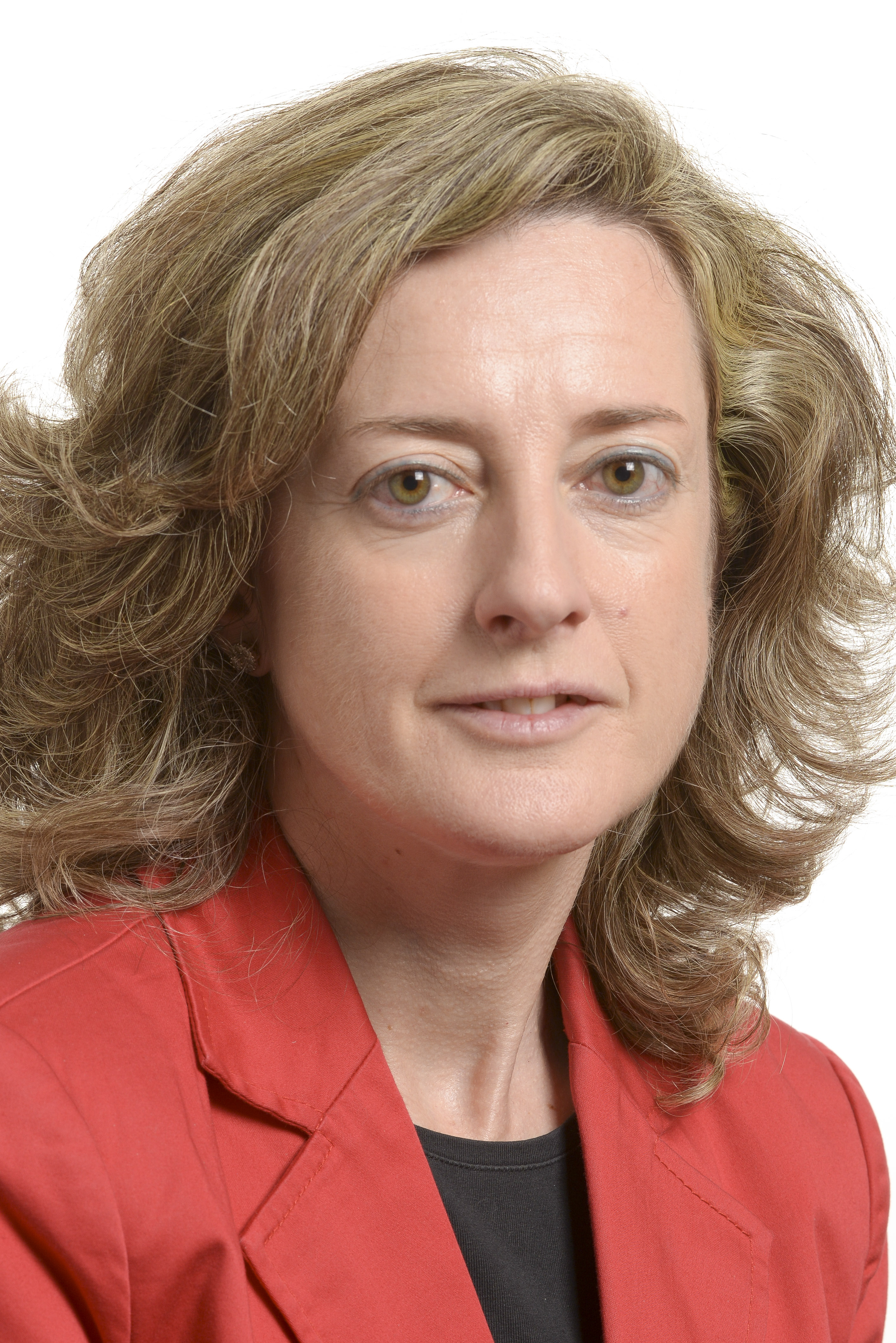

Soledad Cabezón Ruiz (born 1 September 1973) is a Spanish politician for the Spanish Socialist Workers' Party (PSOE) who served as Member of the European Parliament from 2014 until 2019.

She was born in a working-class family in Albaida del Aljarafe. Her grandfather had served in the Republican faction and was later subject to forced labour as retaliation.

== Political career ==
A cardiologist by profession, Cabezón worked for several years at the Hospital Universitario Virgen del Rocío. She served as mayor of Albaida del Aljarafe 2003–2011 and was elected to the Congress of Deputies, the lower house of Cortes Generales in 2008, representing Seville Province. In the 2008–2012 period she served as secretary of equality in the executive committee of the PSOE.

=== Member of the European Parliament, 2014–2019 ===
In the European Parliament election, 2014 Cabezón was nominated in the third spot on the PSOE list and elected as one of 14 members for the party. She was a member of the Committee on Industry, Research and Energy from 2014 until 2015. and the Committee on Petitions. From 2015 until 2019, she served on the Committee on the Environment, Public Health and Food Safety. In addition, she was a member of the Parliament's delegation to the EU-Chile Joint Parliamentary Committee.

Cabezón was a member of the MEP Heart Group (sponsored by the European Heart Network (EHN) and the European Society of Cardiology (ESC)), a group of parliamentarians who have an interest in promoting measures that will help reduce the burden of cardiovascular diseases (CVD). In March 2017, she participated in the first ever gathering of the Party of European Socialists’ health ministers, chaired by Jevgeni Ossinovski.

== Other activities ==
- IDEAS Foundation for progress, Member of the Board

== Personal life ==
Married to a doctor and with three children she lives in Albaida del Aljarafe.
