= Pedro Pérez de Guzmán, 1st Count of Olivares =

16th Century Count of Olivares

Pedro Pérez de Guzmán y Zúñiga (Sp.: Don Pedro Pérez de Guzmán y Zúñiga, primer Conde de Olivares, Seville, 1503 – Madrid, 14 July 1569) was the founder of the House of Olivares, a cadet branch of the House of Medina Sidonia.

== Biography ==
Pedro Pérez de Guzmán was a younger son of Juan Alfonso Pérez de Guzmán, 3rd Duke of Medina Sidonia. His father acquired Olivares, Seville for him from Ferdinand II of Aragon in 1507. Pedro Pérez de Guzmán entered the service of Charles V, Holy Roman Emperor, and, as a reward for participating in the suppression of the Revolt of the Comuneros and his services in Italy, Germany, and Tunisia, Charles V granted Pedro Pérez de Guzmán the Spanish noble title of Count of Olivares in Palermo on October 12, 1535.

Olivares took advantage of papal bulls issued by Pope Clement VII in 1529 and Pope Paul III in 1536 to purchase land formerly held by the military orders. In 1532, he purchased Castilleja de Alcántar (which he renamed Castilleja de Guzmán), Heliche, and Huévar del Aljarafe; the next year, he acquired Castilleja de la Cuesta.

=== Marriage and children ===
In 1539, he married Francisca de Ribera Niño, widow of the Count of Fuensalida, who brought a dowry of 14,000 maravedís. Francisca de Ribera was the daughter of Lope Conchillos y Quintana, an Aragonese secretary with a converso origin, who belonged to a family with a long tradition in royal administration and a considerable fortune.
The marriage produced at least three sons and two daughters :

- Enrique (1540–1607), the second Count, who held numerous public offices;
- Pedro, a gentleman of Philip II and the heir to the throne;
- Ana Félix (died 1612), who married the 2nd Marquess of Camarasa;
- Leonor, who married Diego Velázquez Dávila, 1st Count of Uceda

He was succeeded as Count of Olivares by his son, Enrique de Guzmán, 2nd Count of Olivares, the father of Gaspar de Guzmán, Count-Duke of Olivares.
