= House of Olivares =

Family

Arms of the House of Olivares.

The House of Olivares is a Spanish noble house originating in the Crown of Castile. It is a cadet branch of the House of Medina Sidonia, originating in the sixteenth century.

Historically, the house possessed the lordships of Olivares, Seville; Heliche; Albaida del Aljarafe; Camas, Seville; Castilleja de Guzmán; Castilleja de la Cuesta; Salteras; and Tomares. The most prominent member of the House of Olivares was Gaspar de Guzmán, Count-Duke of Olivares, the favourite of Philip IV of Spain.

== Constitution of the House of Olivares ==
The House of Olivares was constituted in 1539 when Charles I of Spain granted Pedro Pérez de Guzmán, son of Juan Alfonso Pérez de Guzmán, 3rd Duke of Medina Sidonia, the title of Count of Olivares (Spanish conde de Olivares). The title comes from the municipality of Olivares in Seville, which was already owned by Pedro Pérez de Guzmán.

== Counts of Olivares ==
- Pedro Pérez de Guzmán, 1st Count of Olivares
- Enrique de Guzmán, 2nd Count of Olivares (1540–1607)
- Gaspar de Guzmán, 3rd Count of Olivares (1587–1645), who became 1st Count-Duke of Olivares in 1625

== Count-Dukes of Olivares ==
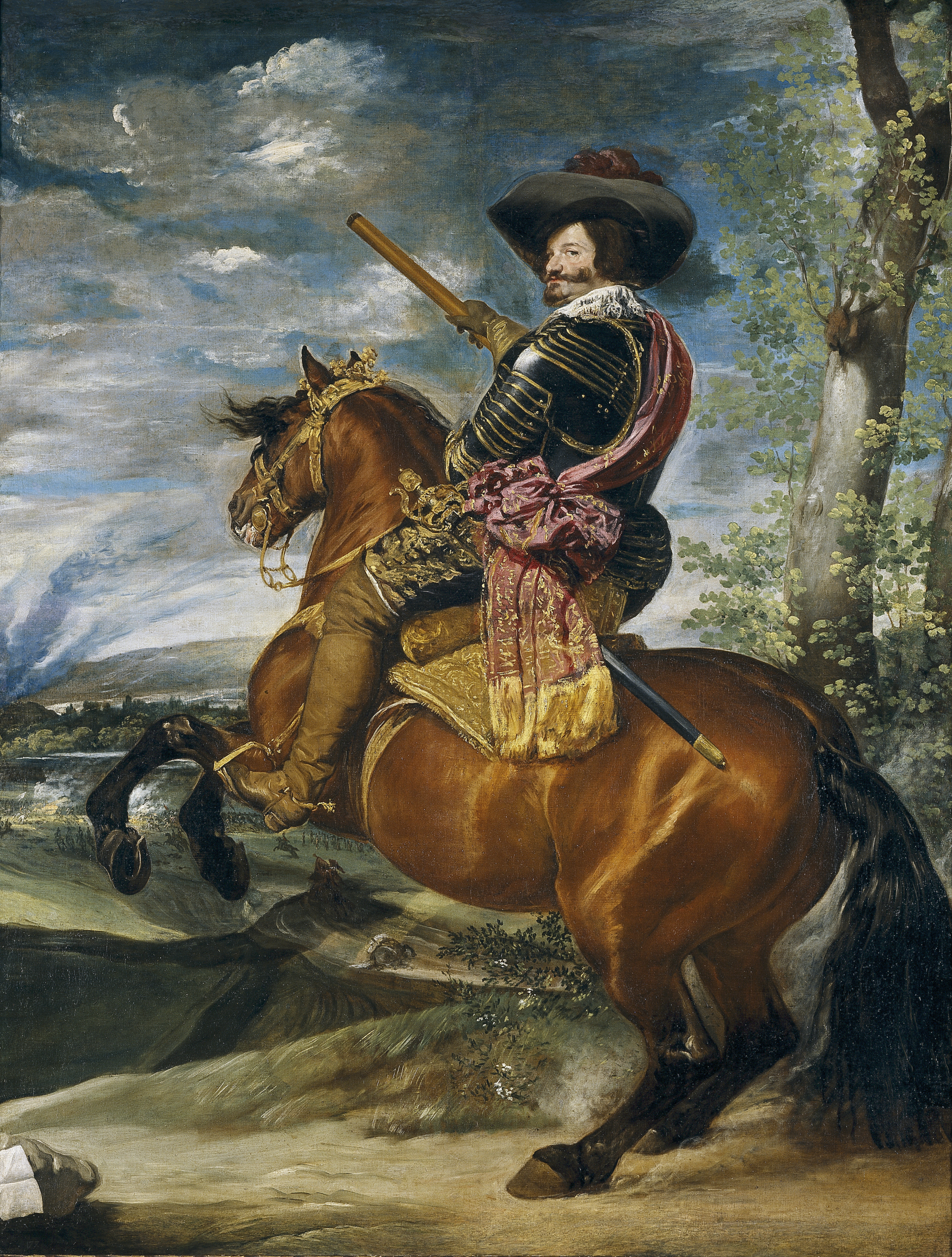
Gaspar de Guzmán, Count-Duke of Olivares.

In 1625, Philip IV of Spain granted Gaspar de Guzmán, 3rd Count of Olivares, the Duchy of Sanlúcar, at which point he assumed the title of Count-Duke of Olivares (Spanish: conde-duque de Olivares).

- Gaspar de Guzmán, Count-Duke of Olivares (1587–1645)
- Enrique Felipe de Guzmán, 2nd Count-Duke of Olivares (1601–1646)
- Gaspar Felipe de Guzmán, 3rd Marquis of Eliche (1646–1648)
- Luis Méndez de Haro, 6th Marquis of Carpio (1598–1661)
- Gaspar Méndez de Haro, 7th Marquis of Carpio (1629–1687)
- Catalina Méndez de Haro, 8th Marchioness of Carpio (1672–1733)
- María Teresa Álvarez de Toledo, 11th Duchess of Alba (1691–1755)
- Fernando de Silva, 12th Duke of Alba (1714–1776)
- María del Pilar de Silva, 13th Duchess of Alba (1762–1802)
- Carlos Miguel Fitz-James Stuart, 14th Duke of Alba (1794–1835)
- Jacobo Fitz-James Stuart, 15th Duke of Alba (1821–1881)
- Carlos María Fitz-James Stuart, 16th Duke of Alba (1849–1901)
- Jacobo Fitz-James Stuart, 17th Duke of Alba (1878–1953)
- Cayetana Fitz-James Stuart, 18th Duchess of Alba (1926–2014)
- Carlos Fitz-James Stuart, 19th Duke of Alba (b. 1948)
