= Enrique Felipe de Guzmán, 2nd Count-Duke of Olivares =

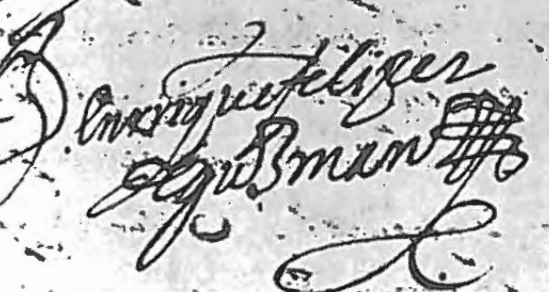
Signature of Enrique Felípez de Guzmán

Enrique Felipe de Guzmán, 2nd Count-Duke of Olivares (14 April 1613 – Loeches (Madrid), 13 June 1646) was the illegitimate son of Gaspar de Guzmán, Count-Duke of Olivares, who was legitimated in 1642 and who inherited the titles of Count-Duke of Olivares and Duke of Sanlúcar la Mayor.

== Biography ==
His mother was his father's mistress, Isabel de Anversa, and he was initially named Julian. In 1626, Gaspar de Guzmán, Count-Duke of Olivares' daughter, the Marchioness of Heliche, and his favorite nephew both died. It was widely believed at court that Olivares' heir would be his remaining nephew, Luis de Haro, but in 1642, Olivares decided to legitimize his son, who was consequently re-christened Enrique Felipe de Guzmán.
This decision infuriated the Queen of Spain, Elisabeth of France, who believed that Olivares' precedent led to Philip IV of Spain's decision to legitimize his bastard son, John of Austria the Younger.

On 28 May 1642, he married Juana Fernández de Velasco, daughter of Bernardino Fernández de Velasco, 6th Duke of Frías.
He was appointed Gentleman of the King's Chamber and Mayor of the Royal Site of Buen Retiro, Ambassador of the Royal Mint (1643), Constable and Chief Notary of the House of Trade in Seville (1644), and was also granted the habit of the Order of Calatrava and the privileges of the Major Commandery of Alcañiz. On 10 October 1642, he received the title of Marquis of Mairena. He was also given command of one of the companies of the Prince's Colonelcy, created for the war in Catalonia.

After his father's fall from grace in 1643, he and his wife were exiled in Loeches. Here, his only child Gaspar Felipe de Guzmán was born in 1646. Enrique Felipe became gravely ill, probably with tuberculosis, and died on 13 June 1646.

His only son Gaspar Felipe died two years later. The titles of Count-Duke of Olivares passed to his nephew Luis Méndez de Haro, after a lengthy legal battle with the widow Inés de Zúñiga, while the Duchy of Sanlúcar la Mayor went to Diego Felípez de Guzmán, 1st Marquis of Leganés.
