= Aelia =

Aelia may refer to:

- Aelia (bug), an insect genus in the tribe Aelini of the sub family Pentatominae
- Aelia (gens), a plebeian family at Rome, which flourished from the fifth century BC until at least the third century AD, a period of nearly eight hundred years
- Aelia Capitolina, a Roman colony in Jerusalem
