= Subria gens =

Ancient Roman family

The gens Subria was an obscure plebeian family at ancient Rome. Few members of this gens are mentioned in history, but others are known from inscriptions.

== Members ==
This list includes abbreviated praenomina. For an explanation of this practice, see filiation.

- Subria L. l. [...]da, a freedwoman named in a late first-century sepulchral inscription from Carthago Nova in Hispania Citerior, along with the Sevir Augustalis Lucius Subrius La[...].
- Subrius Apollinaris, leader of a cohort in an uncertain legion, who made a second- or third-century offering to Jupiter Optimus Maximus in Britannia.
- Sextus Subrius Dexter, tribune of a cohort in the Praetorian Guard in AD 69, went into the Guard's camp with his fellow tribunes, Cetrius Severus and Pompeius Longinus, to determine whether they would be loyal to Galba or intended to mutiny. In 74, he was governor of Sardinia. He may have been the brother of Subrius Flavus, and perhaps is the same Sextus Subrius Dexter mentioned in an inscription from Patavium, dating to the first half of the second century.
- Lucius Subrius Felix, buried at Ostia in Latium, aged thirty-six, in a third-century tomb dedicated by his wife, Laelia Quinta.
- Subrius Flavus or Flavius, tribune of a cohort in the Praetorian Guard during the reign of Nero, was an active member of the Pisonian conspiracy, and proposed to slay the emperor with his own hand. When he was betrayed by one of his co-conspirators, he denied the charges at first, then took responsibility, and went to his death proudly. It was rumoured that he had planned to kill Piso as well, and offer the empire to the philosopher Seneca.
- Titus Subrius Hyginus, dedicated a tomb at Nemausus in Gallia Narbonensis for his wife, Epidia Hedone, the freedwoman of Peculiaris.
- Lucius Subrius La[...], one of the Seviri Augustales of Arelate in Gallia Narbonensis, named in a late first-century sepulchral inscription from Carthago Nova, along with a freedwoman named Subria.
- Gaius Subrius Secundinus, flamen and patron of the province of Alpes Maritimae, buried at Cemenelum, aged forty, in a third-century tomb dedicated by his brother, Gaius Subrius Severianus.
- Gaius Subrius Severianus, dedicated a third-century tomb at Cemenelum in Alpes Maritimae to his brother, the flamen Gaius Subrius Secundinus.

== See also ==
- List of Roman gentes

== Bibliography ==
- Publius Cornelius Tacitus, Annales, Historiae.
- Lucius Cassius Dio Cocceianus (Cassius Dio), Roman History.
- Dictionary of Greek and Roman Biography and Mythology, William Smith, ed., Little, Brown and Company, Boston (1849).
- Theodor Mommsen et alii, Corpus Inscriptionum Latinarum (The Body of Latin Inscriptions, abbreviated CIL), Berlin-Brandenburgische Akademie der Wissenschaften (1853–present).
- René Cagnat et alii, L'Année épigraphique (The Year in Epigraphy, abbreviated AE), Presses Universitaires de France (1888–present).
- August Pauly, Georg Wissowa, et alii, Realencyclopädie der Classischen Altertumswissenschaft (Scientific Encyclopedia of the Knowledge of Classical Antiquities, abbreviated RE or PW), J. B. Metzler, Stuttgart (1894–1980).
- Paul von Rohden, Elimar Klebs, & Hermann Dessau, Prosopographia Imperii Romani (The Prosopography of the Roman Empire, abbreviated PIR), Berlin (1898).
