= Enrique de Guzmán, 2nd Count of Olivares =

Spanish nobleman and statesman

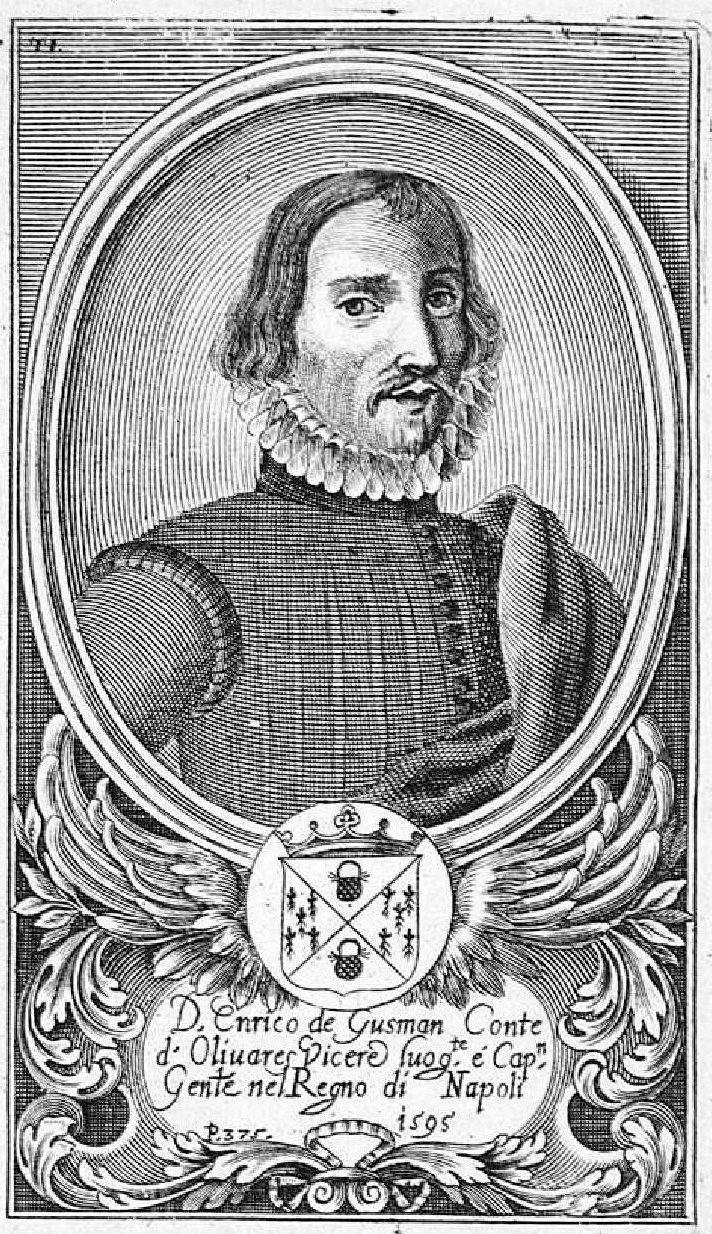
Enrique de Guzmán

Enrique de Guzmán y Ribera, 2nd Count of Olivares (Spanish: Don Enrique de Guzmán y Ribera, segundo Conde de Olivares; 1 March 1540 – 1607) was a Spanish nobleman and statesman.

== Life and career ==
Enrique de Guzmán y Ribera was born in Madrid, the son of Pedro Pérez de Guzmán, 1st Count of Olivares, of Sevilla, and Francisca de Ribera Niño, of Toledo (Niño was her mother's family name; her father's family name was Conchillos, but she took her mother's, as it was more important).

He entered the service of the royal house at a young age, and at age fourteen, he travelled in Europe with his own father in the service of prince Philip, later king Philip II of Spain. He later participated in the war in Naples and in the Battle of St. Quentin (1557), where he was wounded in a leg, something he would use for the rest of his life as an excuse to only go where it suited him.

At the death of his father, in 1569, he inherited the family house and he continued to serve the king in positions of great confidence, like the negotiations with France regarding the new marriage between king Philip with Elizabeth of Valois.

Olivares held many important positions under Philip II of Spain, serving as treasurer of Castile, warden of the Alcázar of Seville, and as Spanish Ambassador to France. In 1582, at age 42, he was appointed ambassador to Rome, where for the next ten years he would represent the king of Spain before the popes Gregory XIII (1572–1585), Sixtus V (1585–1590) and Gregory XIV (1590–1591).

Relations Between the King of Spain and Pope Sixtus were tense: king Philip had asked Pope Sixtus to condemn the French Catholics who supported Henry of Navarre in their fight against the League led by the king of Spain, but Pope Sixtus refused to do so. Olivares first plead, then threatened the pope, and relations deteriorated. The Pope requested several times that Olivares be replaced, but king Philip would not comply. Finally the situation was resolved with the death of the pope. Another point of contention was the rivalry between the Jesuits, subject to the Pope, and the Spanish Inquisition, subject to the king of Spain.

Olivares had a strong, arrogant personality, which made for further friction, specially with pope Sixtus V, who also had a very strong character and special antipathy for the king of Spain. So much was the discord between the Spanish ambassador and Sixtus V that when the pope died, there were rumors that the pope had succumbed to anger caused by Olivares, who "poisoned his days".

Historian López-Calderón, a contemporary of Olivares, recounts several anecdotes representative of the battles between ambassador Olivares and Pope Pius V. For example, Olivares used a bell to call his servants, but this was a privilege restricted only to the Cardinals of the Church, and the Pope sent a Cardinal to ask Olivares to cease this practice. Olivares would not cease, and the matter took larger proportions. The ambassador of France also protested against Olivares, and the Pope sent him a letter of censure. Olivares was received by the pope three times regarding this matter and grew more impatient every time. He replied that Spain was the largest and most powerful Catholic empire and contributed to Rome more than any other kingdom and demanded he be allowed to continue using the bell to call his servants. He finished his tirade by calling the pope "vuestra ingratitud" (your ingratitude) instead of "vuestra beatitud" (your piousness). But the pope would not budge, and Olivares was forced to renounce the practice. After this, Olivares began to call his servants by firing a small cannon he placed on the roof of his residence. The noise and vibration caused by these firings caused so many protests that pope Pius soon gave Olivares the privilege of using a bell to call his servants.

Another story says Olivares was enraged because the pope, instead of paying him full attention, was distractedly playing with a little lapdog, and Olivares angrily took the dog away from the pontiff and put it on the floor. After the death of pope Sixtus V, relations with his successor, Gregory XIV, improved dramatically.

From 1591 to 1595, Olivares was appointed viceroy of Sicily. In November 1595, Philip II appointed Olivares viceroy of Naples. His time in Naples is noted for its abundant crops; Olivares' vigorous attempts to suppress banditry in Naples; and a building program sponsored by Olivares utilizing the services of architect Domenico Fontana. During his service in Sicily, Olivares strengthened the coast against Ottoman and Barbary pirates attacks, and lead successful raiding on Ottoman ship in the area and, numerous bombing of Tripoli, Misrata, Tunis and Alger for which he was rewarded. Upon the death of Philip II in 1598, Philip III of Spain confirmed Olivares as Viceroy of Naples. Historians of that time give him high marks for his service in Italy as ambassador and viceroy.

Olivares returned to Spain in 1599, becoming a member of the Spanish Council of State. He died in Madrid in 1607.

== Marriage and issue ==
Olivares was married to María Pimentel de Fonseca, daughter of Jerónimo de Acevedo, 4th Count of Monterrey and Inés de Velasco. Olivares and his wife had the following children:

- Jerónimo de Guzmán, who died in infancy
- Gaspar de Guzmán, Count-Duke of Olivares, favourite of Philip IV of Spain
- Francisca de Guzmán
- Inés de Guzmán, who married Álvaro Enríquez de Almansa, 6th Marquis of Alcañices
- Leonor María de Guzmán, who married Manuel de Acevedo, 6th Count of Monterrey

Government offices
Preceded by Diego Enríquez de Guzmán	Viceroy of Sicily; 1592–1595	Succeeded by Giovanni Ventimiglia
Preceded by Juan de Zúñiga y Avellaneda	Viceroy of Naples; 1595–1599	Succeeded by Fernando Ruiz de Castro
Spanish nobility
Preceded by Pedro Pérez de Guzmán	Count of Olivares	Succeeded by Gaspar de Guzmán
