= Equestrian Portrait of the Count-Duke of Olivares =

1636 painting by Diego Velázquez

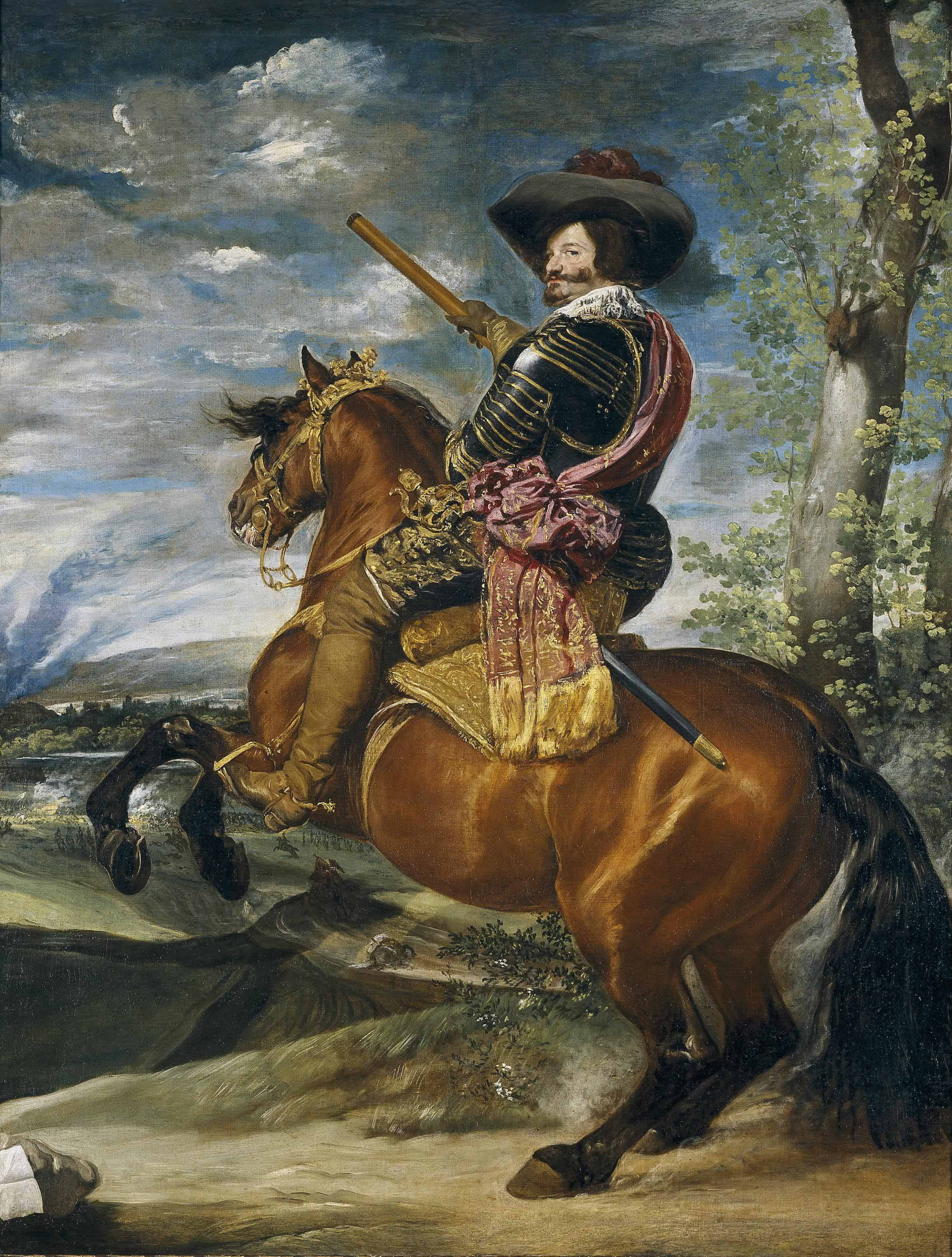
- Artist: Diego Velázquez
- Year: c. 1636
- Medium: oil paint, canvas
- Dimensions: 313 cm (123 in) × 239 cm (94 in)
- Location: Prado Hall 012, Royal Palace of Madrid
- Owner: Ferdinand VII
- Accession: P001181

Gaspar de Guzmán, Count-Duke of Olivares, on Horseback (Spanish: Gaspar de Guzmán, conde-duque de Olivares, a caballo) is an oil on canvas painting by Spanish painter Diego Velázquez, made around the year 1636. It has been in the Museo del Prado in Madrid since its inauguration in 1819.

This painting is an exception for the style of Velázquez as its design and color are more vigorous and pompous than his usual more somber portraits. The object of the work was to validate the power of Gaspar de Guzman, Count of Olivares and Duke of Sanlúcar la Mayor, known as the Count-Duke of Olivares, the chief minister under Philip IV of Spain, a Spanish nobleman and influential politician.

== Description ==
Olivares is portrayed on horseback, an honor usually reserved for monarchs that reflects the power he attained as valido or right hand of the king (equivalent to the current prime minister's office). The picture resembles equestrian portraits Velázquez had painted for the Hall of Realms of the Buen Retiro Palace, though it was not made for this series but rather to display a particular custom of Olivares bound for home. The painting is not dated but was probably painted just after this series, around 1638, and possibly after the Battle of Fuenterrabía, a military success of the Franco–Spanish War that was attributed to Olivares although he was not personally involved. The picture did not join the royal collection at the predecessor of the Museo del Prado until a century later.

The Count-Duke wears a wide-brimmed feathered hat and the band of the State; the hand holds a marshal's baton, which marks the direction of the battle. The armor he wears is possibly preserved in the Palace of Liria of Madrid (collection of the House of Alba). The Count-Duke looks at the viewer, making sure all can witness his feat. The figure is viewed from a low viewpoint and his torso is turned back, making it look more slender; Olivares had a massive body and was rather clumsy, as seen in the portraits that Velázquez had done before.

The horse raises its front legs, performing a somersault or levade as it looks toward the battlefield. Drawing a diagonal from the hills that can be seen in the landscape, the composition provides energy to the portraiture; in this dynamism, the work reminds of Rubens. This equestrian portrait differs from those made for the royal family and is believed to have been suggested by Olivares; Velázquez had to take particular care, as Olivares was the highest political office of the court (after the king) and had supported him in his early days as a painter in Madrid.

The battle in the distance is treated with small spots. The landscape is very schematic, as is typical of Velázquez, with no buildings or characters. Perhaps it is because the painter did not know the town of Hondarribia, where the battle happened as described, although other sources believe the painting does not refer to any particular battle. The hills fade in green and blue tones, providing a feeling of remoteness, for it is said to have a very sharp aerial perspective.

The rich chromaticism and treatment of light give the scene a great vitality.

== See also ==
- List of works by Diego Velázquez
- Portrait of Duke de Olivares
