= Portrait of the Count-Duke of Olivares (São Paulo) =

1624 painting by Diego Velázquez

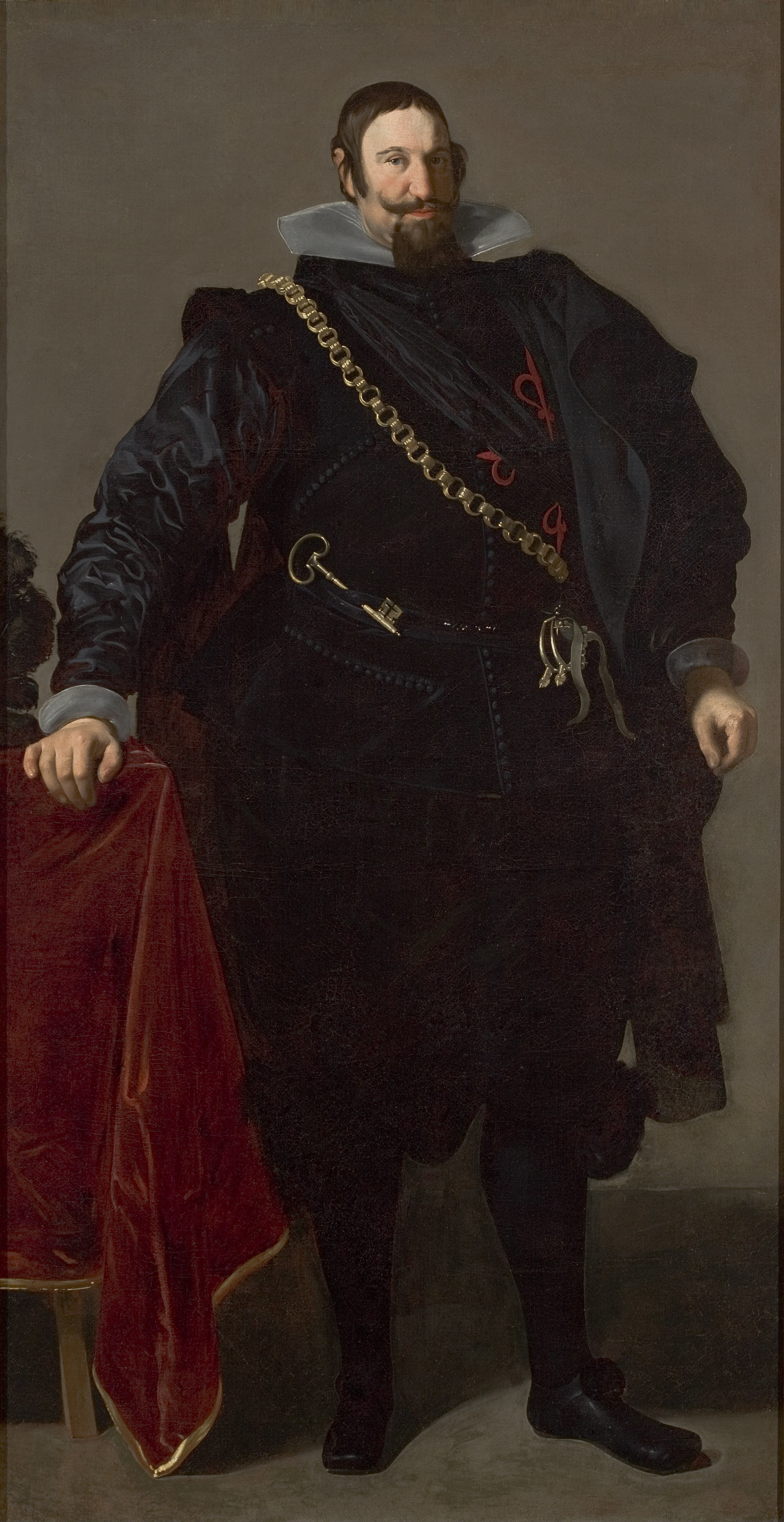
- Year: 1624
- Medium: oil paint, canvas
- Dimensions: 202 cm (80 in) × 105.5 cm (41.5 in) × 3.5 cm (1.4 in)
- Location: São Paulo Museum of Art, Brazil
- Accession: MASP.00171

The Portrait of the Count-Duke of Olivares is a 1624 portrait by Spanish painter Diego Velázquez. It is housed in the São Paulo Museum of Art in São Paulo, Brazil.

== History and characteristics of the painting ==
The man in the portrait is Gaspar de Guzmán y Pimentel, Count-Duke of Olivares, (Rome, January 6, 1587 – Toro, July 22, 1645), a Spanish politician and nobleman, Count of Olivares and Duke of Sanlucar la Mayor, a favorite of King Philip IV.

The precise date the painting was finished is not known, however the painter took fees for his work on December 4, 1624.

The painting shows the Count-Duke standing with his left hand on the hilt of his sword, resting his right hand on a table from where a hat emerges, which in turn rests on a velvet carpet. The sitter wears a sober black coat, with the symbols of his power, a gold chain with large links, gold spurs, and the Red Cross of the Order of Calatrava, noting the importance, power and seriousness of character.

Also noteworthy is the huge neck bust with flat plate in comparison with the smaller size of the head, which creates an interesting visual impact.

== See also ==
- List of works by Diego Velázquez

== Bibliography ==
- El conde-duque de Olivares, by John H. Elliott. ISBN 84-397-0248-5
- El Conde-Duque de Olivares. La pasión de mandar. Gregorio Marañón, (1936), reedited by Espasa, Madrid, 2006. ISBN 84-670-2285-X
- Yo, conde-Duque de Olivares. El arte de lo imposible. Eduardo Chamorro, (1989), edited by Planeta DeAgostini, 1992. ISBN 84-395-5407-9
