= Francisco José Olivares =

Spanish composer and organist (1778–1854)

Francisco José Olivares (17 November 1778 – 2 September 1854) was a Spanish composer and organist who lived in the late eighteenth century and early nineteenth century. Throughout his musical career, he worked in Cuenca, Orihuela and Salamanca.

== Biography ==
Francisco José Olivares was born in Rubielos Bajos, Cuenca, on 17 November 1778. At the age of 9, in 1788, he started to attend the Colegio San José de Infantes de Choir of the Cathedral of Cuenca, where he began his musical training. Pedro Aranaz was one of his teachers, and Olivares was one of his favourite students. He was also the student of the organist Juan Manuel del Barrio. His first two works date from 1794, were a motet and a mass.

On 29 July 1796, he obtained the position of second organist in the Cathedral of Orihuela (Alicante) where he remained until 1803.

=== Salamanca ===
Olivares moved to Salamanca in 1803, when he obtained the appointment as the first organist and rector of the Colegio de Mozos de Nuestra Señora de la Asunción. In 1806, to improve the teaching of choir children in the cathedral, he asked Pedro Aranaz's help to establish a nursery school in Salamanca, similar to the one in Cuenca. As a result of this collaboration, he made a composition treatise, of which a copy is kept in the library of the Madrid Royal Conservatory.

In 1817 Olivares accompanied Manuel Doyagüe to court, appearing before King Fernando VII, on the occasion of the birth of his first daughter by his wife Isabel de Braganza. Both conducted their music at the Royal Chapel: Doyagüe presented the Te Deum a 8 with an obbligato organ in D major and his Great Mass, both for two choirs and orchestra, and Olivares his Scene of Abrádates and Panteá for singers and pianoforte. The scene alludes through mythology to the recent widowhood of the king, as the queen did not survive the birth of her first-born, who also died a few months later.

==== Last years ====
Olivares spent the rest of his life linked to the Cathedral of Salamanca, although trying to achieve greater recognition. On 7 October 1825, he managed to be appointed, upon request to the council, as the master of the chapel of the Cathedral of Segovia, but he rejected the appointment on 9 February 1826. On 4 March 1830, competitive examinations were called for the position of director and composer from the Royal Chapel of Madrid, showing Olivares, but without achieving the appointment. In 1839 he assumed part of the functions of the chapel master when Doyagüe could not fulfill them, due to his advanced age. He was benefited by Queen Isabella II under the Concordat of 1851, but was unable to retire due to the precarious economic situation of the cathedral. He died in 1854.

== Work ==
His work is mainly religious and vocal, including carols, psalms, motets, requiem masses, lamentations etc., although he also cultivated secular genres such as song and scene. Among his theoretical works, the composition treaty is worth mentioning. The archive of the Cathedral of Salamanca preserves some thirty of his works. Other works are kept in the National Library of Spain and the Madrid Royal Conservatory.
