= Aznalcázar =

- town
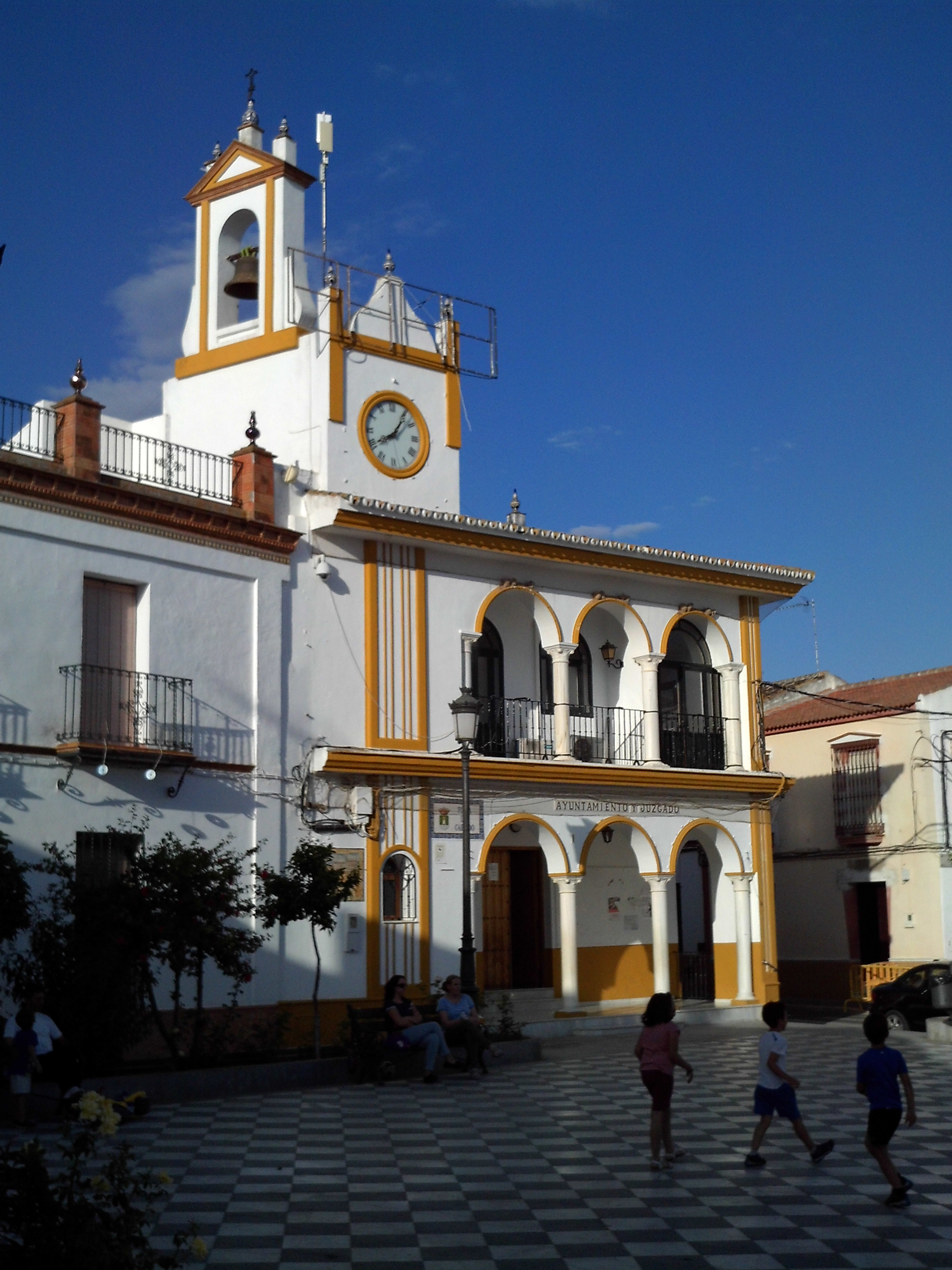
- Town hall

- Flag Coat of arms

- Location in Spain
- Coordinates: 37°18′19″N 6°14′54″W
- Country: Spain
- Province: Seville
- Comarca: Aljarafe

Government
  - Mayor: Manuela Cabello

Area
  - Total: 449.84 km^{2} (173.68 sq mi)
- Elevation: 67 m (220 ft)

Population (2025-01-01)
  - Total: 4,875
  - Density: 10.84/km^{2} (28.07/sq mi)
- Demonym: Aznalcaceños or Aznalcazareños
- Time zone: UTC+1 (CET)
  - Summer (DST): UTC+2 (CEST)
- Postal code: 41849
- Area code: (+34) 955
- Website: Official website

Aznalcázar is a town in the province of Seville, southern Spain. It is 20 minutes from Seville, and is one of the 13 towns located in Doñana National Park, one of Spain's largest national parks and wildlife reserves.

Like most Spanish towns, Aznalcázar has an active social and cultural life, with several bars and restaurants, annual "fiestas", two supermarkets, one Spanish language school for foreigners and three banks. It is also home to Las Minas golf course.

Public transportation connects Aznalcázar with Seville, as well as nearby towns such as El Rocío and other landmarks.

== History ==
The town may be identical with Olontigi, an ancient Tartessian settlement of which not much is known except its coinage issued in the 2nd and 1st centuries BC, bearing the Latin inscription OLVNT. The Barrington Atlas of the Ancient World equates this site with modern Aznalcázar. Less likely alternatives proposed in the 19th century include Gibraleón, Moguer and Almonte, all in the Province of Huelva. Given Pliny's mention of the city along with Laelia and Lastigi on the Menoba river (Guadiamar), Aznalcázar, or a nearby town, is the most likely candidate.

The current name derives from the Arabic حصن القصر (Ḥiṣn al-Qaṣr), meaning "Fortress of the Palace".

== Main sights ==
- Church of St. Paul, in Gothic-Mudéjar style
- 18th century houses
- Old Fountain
- Cerro del Alcázar, site of archaeological findings (such as Punic-Libyan coins) and remains, including those of the fortress from which the town takes its name

== Tourism ==
Located inside the Doñana, Aznalcázar is a popular destination for ecotourism and for visitors to Seville. The town has one small hotel, one casa rural (bed and breakfast-like hotel) and one Spanish language school.

== See also ==
- List of municipalities in Seville
