= Gaspar de Guzmán, Count-Duke of Olivares =

Spanish royal favourite of Philip IV and minister

The Most Excellent The Count-Duke of Olivares GE
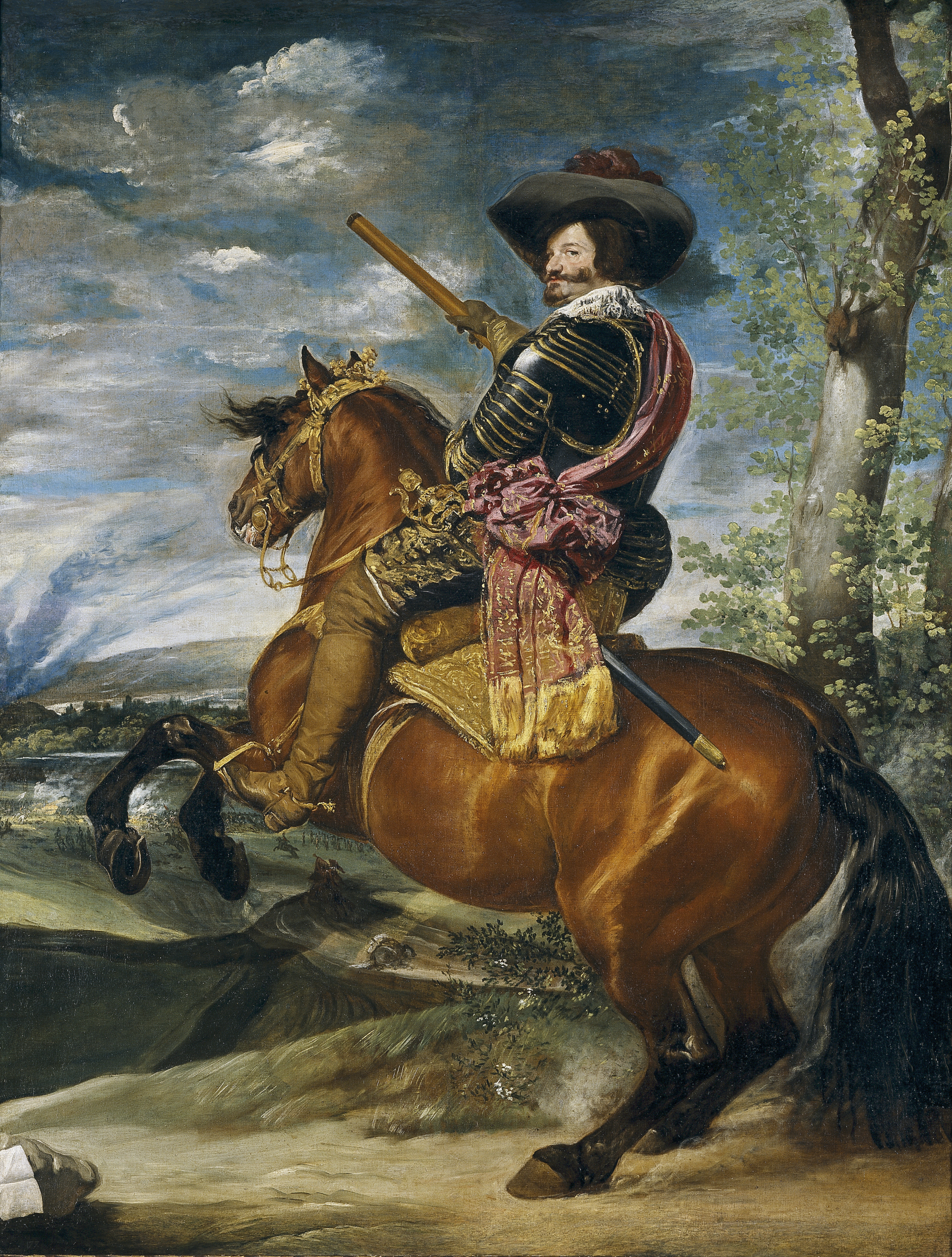
- Equestrian Portrait of the Count-Duke of Olivares by Diego Velázquez

Valido of the King of Spain
- In office 25 January 1622 – 23 January 1643
- Monarch: Philip IV
- Preceded by: Baltasar de Zúñiga
- Succeeded by: Luis de Haro

Personal details
- Born: 6 January 1587 Rome, Papal States
- Died: 22 July 1645 (aged 58) Toro, Crown of Castile, Spain
- Spouse: Inés de Zúñiga y Velasco (m. 1607)
- Parents: Enrique de Guzmán y Ribera (father); María Pimentel de Fonseca (mother)

Gaspar de Guzmán y Pimentel, 1st Duke of Sanlúcar, 3rd Count of Olivares, GE, known as the Count-Duke of Olivares (taken by joining both his countship and subsequent dukedom) (6 January 1587 – 22 July 1645), was a Spanish royal favourite (Spanish: valido) of Philip IV and minister. He was appointed as Grandee on 10 April 1621, a day after the ending of the Twelve Years' Truce, and was a key figure that shaped state policy in Spain until January 1643. During his rule, he over-exerted Spain in foreign affairs and unsuccessfully attempted domestic reform. His policy of committing Spain to recapture Holland led to a renewal of the Eighty Years' War while Spain was also embroiled in the Thirty Years' War (1618–1648). In addition, his attempts to centralise power and increase wartime taxation led to revolts in Catalonia and in Portugal, which brought about his downfall.

== Rise to power ==
Arms of the House of Olivares.

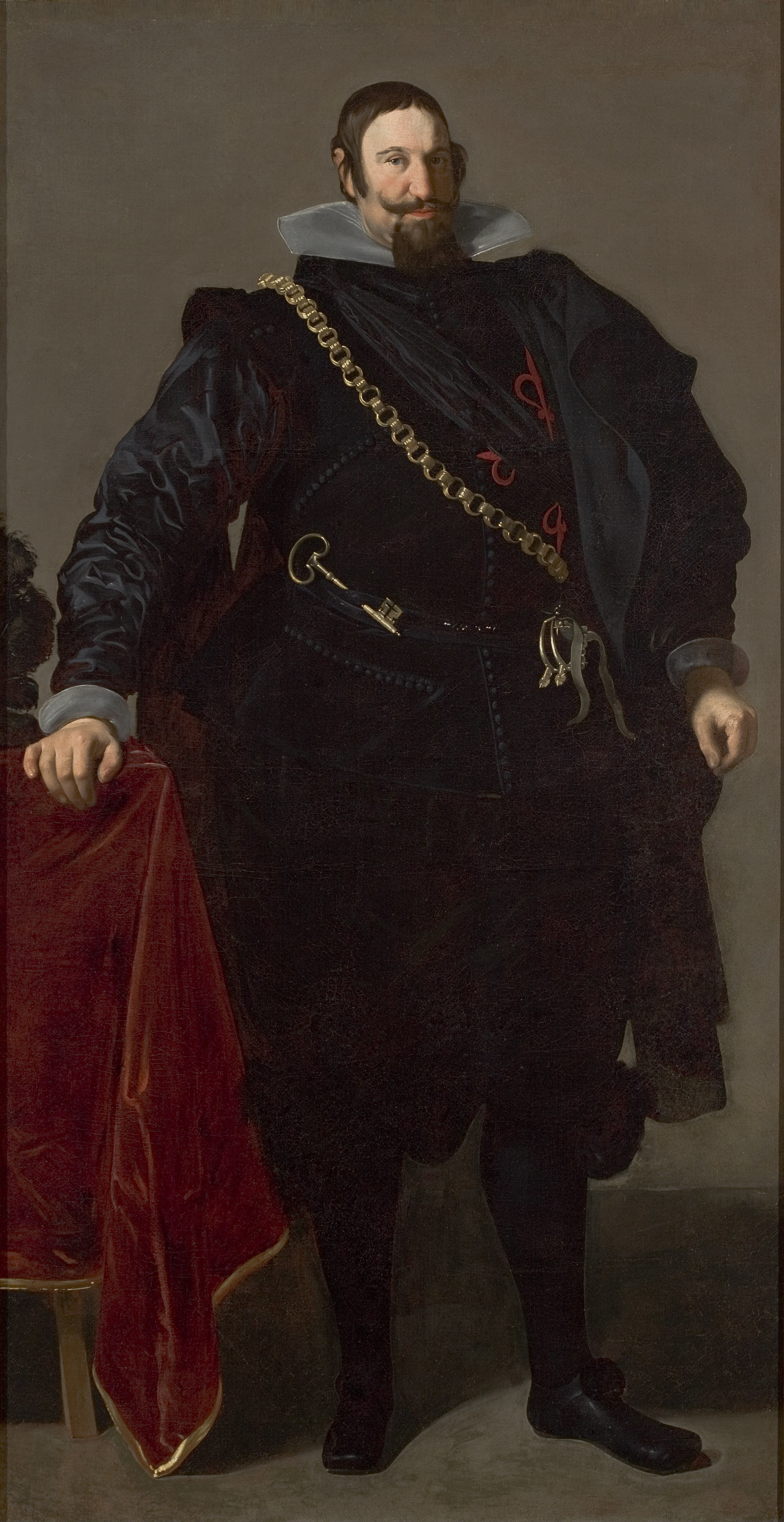
A relatively youthful Olivares in 1624, three years into his time in power, dressed in robes of the Order of Calatrava by Diego Velázquez

Olivares was born in Rome in 1587, where his father, Enrique de Guzmán, 2nd Count of Olivares, from one of Spain's oldest noble families, was the Spanish ambassador. His mother died young, and his father brought him up under a strict parental regime. While in Rome, Olivares appointed Tomás Fernández de Medrano to serve in his service from 1582 to 1590. He returned to Spain in 1599, and became student rector at Salamanca University. By background, he was both a man of letters and well trained in arms. During the reign of King Philip III, he was appointed to a post in the household of the heir apparent, Philip, by his maternal uncle Don Baltasar de Zúñiga, a key foreign policy advisor to Phillip III, who himself had already established a significant influence over the young prince. Olivares in turn rapidly became the young prince's most trusted advisor.

When Philip IV ascended the throne in 1621, at the age of sixteen, he showed his confidence in Olivares by ordering that all papers requiring the royal signature should first be sent to the count-duke; despite this, Olivares, then aged 34, had no real experience of administration.

Olivares told his uncle de Zúñiga, who was to die the following year, that he was now the dominant force at court; he had become what is known in Spain as a valido, something more than a prime minister, the favourite and alter ego of the king. His compound title is explained by the fact that he inherited the title of Count of Olivares, but was created Duke of Sanlúcar la Mayor by King Philip IV of Spain. He begged the King to allow him to preserve his inherited title in combination with the new honour — according to a practice almost unique in Spanish history. Accordingly, he was commonly spoken of as the count-duke.

Olivares' personality and appearance have attracted much comment, especially by 17th-century writers, who were generally critical of them. He possessed a strikingly 'big, heavy body and florid face'. Contemporaries described an 'extravagant, out-size personality with a gift for endless self-dramatisation', others, more positively, have outlined a 'determined, perceptive and ambitious' personality. Olivares' enemies saw in him a desire to acquire excessive wealth and power. He disliked sports and light-hearted entertainment, but was a good horseman, albeit hampered by his weight in later life.

Olivares did not share the King's taste for personally acquiring art and literature, although he may have helped assemble the King's own collection, and it was he who brought to Philip's attention the young artist Diego Velázquez, in 1623. For himself he formed a vast collection of state papers, ancient and contemporary, which he endeavoured to protect from destruction by entailing them as an heirloom. He also formed a splendid aviary for the Buen Retiro Palace, which lent him comfort after the death of his daughter but which opened the door for his enemies to nickname the entire Retiro the Gallinero, or the hencoop.

Velázquez painted at least three portraits of his friend and original patron, producing the baroque equestrian portrait along with the standing portraits now at the Hermitage and São Paulo. It is possible that other portraits by Velázquez commissioned by the King were destroyed after Olivares' fall — in a copy of Prince Baltasar Carlos in the Riding School, his figure was painted over — though a few minor portraits made in the conde-duque's last years of power remain.

== Style of government ==
The royal favourite, who also was Sumiller de Corps and Caballerizo mayor to the King, came to power with a desire to commit the monarchy to a 'crusade of reform', with his early recommendations being extremely radical. The heart of the problem, Olivares felt, was Spain's moral and spiritual decline.

De Zúñiga and Olivares had both presented Philip IV with the concept of restoring the kingdoms to their condition under Philip II, undoing the alleged decline that had occurred under the King's father, Philip III, and in particular his royal favourite, the Francisco Gómez de Sandoval, 1st Duke of Lerma. Olivares was concerned that Spain was too attached to the idea of limpieza de sangre, 'purity of blood', and worried about Castilians' disinclination for manual work. For Olivares, the concept of Spain was centred on the monarchy and Philip IV as a person; unlike his French contemporary Cardinal Richelieu, Olivares did not elaborate a concept of the 'state' as separate from the person of the king.

Olivares was inclined to see domestic policy as a tool in support of foreign policy – a common view amongst contemporary arbitristas, such as Sancho de Moncada and Jeronimo Zeballos. Like many other contemporaries, he had a keen interest in astrology, and its potential impact on the world around him. Naturally, he incorporated that interest into political expression: he promoted Philip as "The Planet King" — the Sun, traditionally the fourth planet, was a fitting emblem for the fourth Philip of Spain — taking for his own symbol the sunflower. Whilst displaying huge confidence in his own capabilities and judgment, he also felt considerable 'doubt and uneasiness' over his position as chief minister to the king.

Olivares was well known for his passion for work. Olivares would rise early, go to confession, wake Philip IV and discuss the day's events with him, before then working throughout the rest of the day, often until 11 o'clock at night. Initially, Olivares would meet with the King three times a day, although this declined over time until he met with him only once a day. Whilst living a private life of "Spartan austerity" himself, Olivares was skillful in using the formal and elaborate protocol of the court as a way of controlling the ambitions of Philip's enemies and rivals.

Determined to attempt to improve the bureaucratic Polysynodial System of Castilian government, during the 1620s Olivares began to create juntas, smaller governmental committees, to increase the speed of decision making. By the 1630s, these were increasingly packed with Olivares' own placemen, tasked to implement his policies. He placed tight controls on the use of special royal favours to circumvent tight spending controls. The result was a very particular combination of centralised power in the form of Olivares, and loose government executed by small committees.

Over time, Olivares began to suffer under his tremendous workload, developing sleeping disorders and, later in life, clearly suffering from mental illness. He became increasingly impatient with those who disagreed with him, flying into rages, and refusing to listen to advice proffered by his own advisers. His behaviour may also have been exacerbated by the severe bloodletting and excessive purging he received from his doctors at key moments in his career. Olivares wrote extensively, although there are differences of opinion amongst modern scholars on his work: some find them 'forceful, incisive and persuasive', others consider them 'inflated and tortuous prose', wandering down 'interminable labyrinths'.

== Foreign policies ==
For twenty-two years Olivares directed Spain's foreign policy. It was a period of constant war, and finally of disaster abroad and of rebellion at home. Olivares' foreign policy was based around his assessment that Philip IV was surrounded by jealous rivals across Europe, who wished to attack his position as a champion of the Catholic Church; in particular, Olivares saw the rebellious Dutch as a key enemy. Although Olivares made much of religion as a facet of Spain's foreign policy, in practice he often overruled that principle. It has also been argued that Olivares' dislike of flamboyant spending may have influenced his views of the Dutch Republic, known for its relatively open show of wealth.

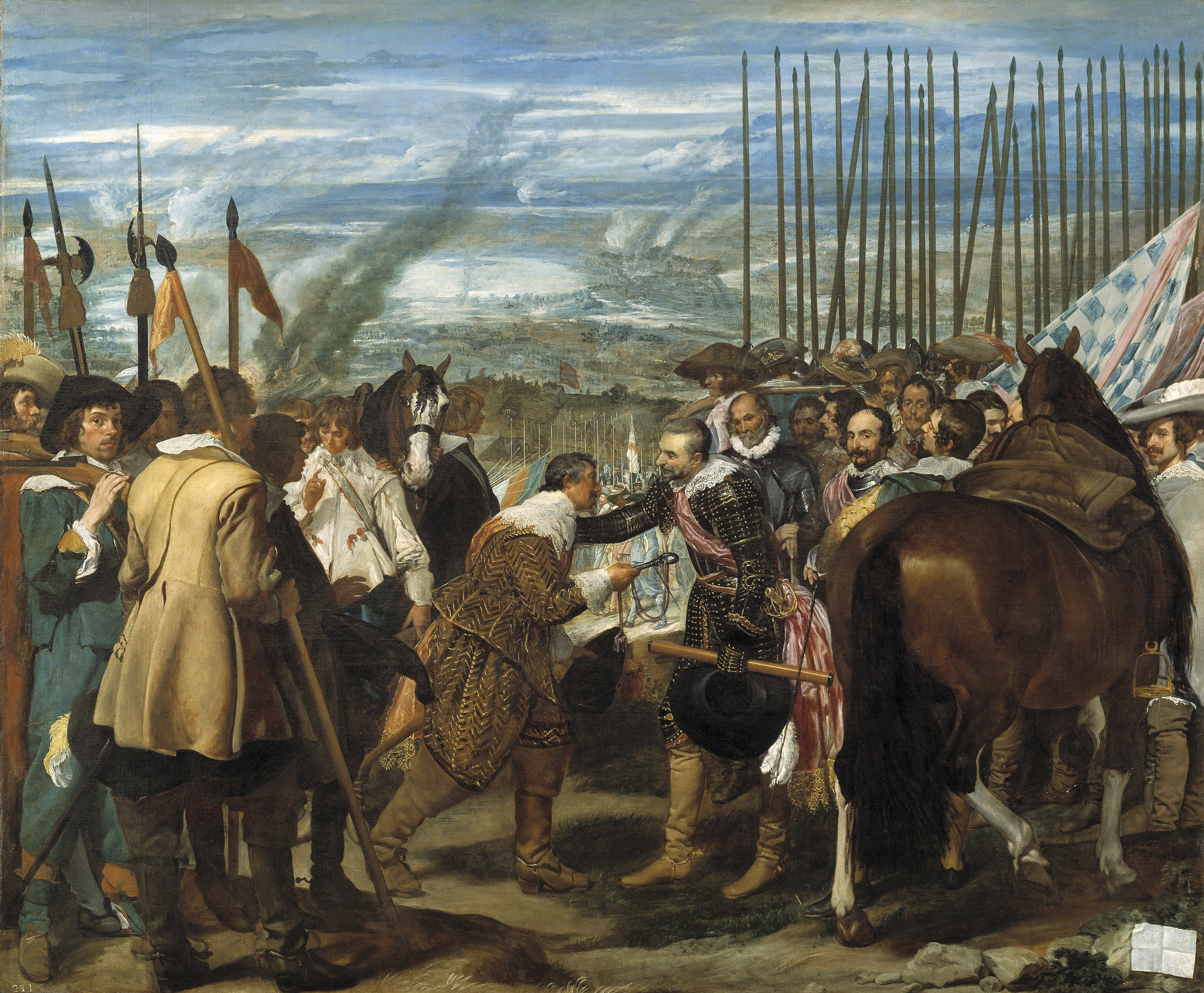
The re-taking of Breda, an early Spanish success in the Eighty Years' War that would ultimately result in Olivares' fall from power, by Diego Velázquez.

Olivares' first key decision came in 1621. Under Philip III, Spain had successfully intervened in the Electoral Palatinate in combination with the forces of Ferdinand II, Holy Roman Emperor, a fellow Habsburg, during 1618–20, surrounding the Dutch provinces that had rebelled against Spanish rule some forty years before.

An armistice had successfully held since April 1609, but in his role as foreign policy advisor, Olivares' uncle Baltasar de Zúñiga had brought Spain closer and closer to recommencing hostilities as a means of improving Spain's negotiating position with the Dutch. Olivares' new influence was central to the decision to finally abandon the armistice in favour of renewed military action using the Army of Flanders and economic warfare – ending the Twelve Years Truce and attacking Dutch fleets and applying trading embargoes. This policy would ultimately fail over the next thirty years; to some the Spanish recommencement of the war has appeared 'surprising', whilst it can also be explained as a misreading of internal Dutch politics. Whilst the strategy itself was a failure, Olivares' tactics – his attempt to combine military and economic warfare – have since been praised as a 'shrewd policy'.

For the remainder of the Eighty Years' War, Olivares would pursue a 'Netherlands first' strategy, focusing his resources and attention on delivering success in the Netherlands first, with the hope of dealing with the other challenges facing the Spanish across Europe once this key Spanish possession had been secured. For the first fifteen years of the war, this strategy proved largely successful. Spain made considerable early advances against the Dutch, finally retaking the key city of Breda in 1624, albeit at huge expense.

In 1634, against the backdrop of Swedish successes across northern Europe, Olivares was crucial to the creation of a fresh Spanish army in northern Italy, and the projection of that force under the leadership of Cardinal-Infante Ferdinand along the Spanish Road into Germany, where the 'almost miraculous appearance' of the army defeated the Protestant alliance at the Battle of Nördlingen (1634). The scene had been set, Olivares believed, for a renewed attack on the Dutch.

Olivares' strategy ultimately failed due to the entry of France into the war. His handling of War of the Mantuan Succession, which started to pitch France against the Habsburgs in northern Italy and would ultimately result in the French invasion of Spain, has been much criticised. By 1634, France seeing the Spanish successes in Germany and the defeat of her Swedish allies, began raising the political stakes, taking provocative military action on a small scale. In 1635, Spain responded by intervening against the Elector of Trier, a significant move that effectively forced a French declaration of war. By this stage in the war, Olivares' advice to the King was that this conflict with France would be for all or nothing – Spain would win or fall by the result.

Nonetheless, French victory was far from certain in the 1630s; Olivares' invasion plan in 1635 involved four different armies and two navies, being described as 'the most ambitious military conception of early modern Europe.' Although Spanish forces were within 16 miles of Paris at the height of their success that year, Olivares' plan had severely overstretched Spanish resources and ultimately failed, leaving Spain to face a massive counter-attack in 1637.

By 1639, Olivares was attempting to convince the King to compromise with the French but without success; he considered making a separate peace with the Dutch, which would have freed up resources for the war on France, but the Dutch occupation of Brazil and the Portuguese opposition to any peace involving relinquishing their colony made this impossible. The destruction of the Spanish Atlantic fleet at the Battle of the Downs was another major blow, leaving a cash-strapped Spain unable to build a replacement force. An attempt to bring Poland into the war failed. By 1640, Olivares' foreign policy was creaking badly under pressure from an increasingly powerful France, with money increasingly tight.

== Domestic policies ==
Olivares approached the problem of domestic policy through the prism of foreign affairs. Spain in the early 17th century was a collection of possessions – the kingdoms of Castile, Aragon, Naples, Portugal, the autonomous provinces of Valencia, Catalonia and Andalusia as well as the Netherlands, Duchy of Milan etc. – all loosely joined through the institution of the Castile monarchy and the person of Philip IV.

Each part had different taxation, privileges and military arrangements; in practice, the level of taxation in many of the more peripheral provinces was less than in Castile, but the privileged position of the Castilian nobility at all senior levels of royal appointment was a contentious issue for the less favoured provinces. This loose system had successfully resisted reform and higher taxation before, resulting in Spain having had historically, up until the 1640s at least, less than the usual number of fiscal revolts for an early modern European state.

By the 1620s and '30s, however, the ability of the Spanish monarchy to extract resources from Castile was at breaking point, as illustrated by Olivares' early failure to reform the millones food tax in Castile, and with war continuing across Europe, new options were necessary.

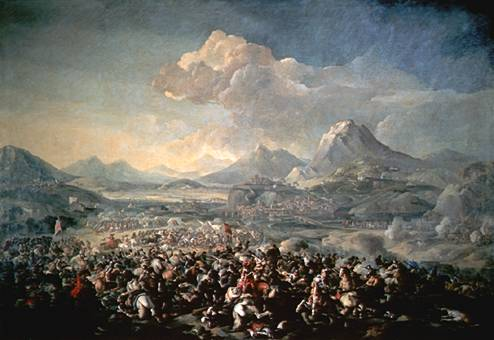
The Battle of Montjuïc (1641), by Pandolfo Reschi, a Spanish failure during the Catalan Revolt which would help seal Olivares' fate as prime minister.

Like many contemporaries, Olivares was 'haunted' by Spain's potential decline, and saw part of the solution at least in a reform of the Spanish state. Olivares saw Catalan and the other provinces as paying less to the crown than they should, and did not really understand why the inhabitants should object to a fairer distribution of taxes. He was confident in the intellectual argument for a better defended, better ordered Spain, and never seems to have shown serious doubt that his plans would succeed, or understood the growing hatred against his rule.

These plans took form first in Olivares' 'Union of Arms' concept, put forward in 1624. This would have involved the different elements of Philip's territories raising fixed quotas of soldiers in line with their size and population. Despite being portrayed by Olivares as a purely military plan, it reflected Olivares' desire for a more closely unified Spain – although not, it is generally argued, a completely unified kingdom.

Olivares' 'Union of Arms' plan failed in the face of opposition from the provinces, in particular Catalonia, leading him to offer his resignation to the King in 1626 – it was not accepted. The subsequent years were challenging financially for Spain. In 1627, Olivares attempted to deal with the problem of Philip's Genoese bankers – who had proved uncooperative in recent years – by declaring a state bankruptcy.

With the Genoese debt now removed, Olivares hoped to turn to indigenous bankers for renewed funds. In practice, the plan was a disaster. The Spanish treasure fleet of 1628 was captured by the Dutch, and Spain's ability to borrow and transfer money across Europe declined sharply. Faced by the Dutch capture of Brazil, Olivares turned to Portugal in 1637, attempting to raise taxes to pay for a mission to reclaim the Portuguese colony. The result was a minor Portuguese uprising.

Union of Arms (Unión de Armas) envisaged by Olivares.

The final years of Olivares' rule were marked by major uprisings in Catalonia and Portugal. Catalan histories have tended to represent Olivares as deliberately provoking the rebellion of 1640, in order that he could crush it and thereby unify Spain, although this is considered doubtful by most historians. Instead, it appears most likely that in the face of the increased French threat and the need to raise men, money and arms to defend the Peninsula, Olivares sent his army of 9,000 men into Catalonia expecting relatively limited resistance. Chaos ensued in the form of a major revolt; Portugal followed suit later in the year in the face of Olivares' attempts to convince its nobility to serve in the war in Catalonia, with Lisbon offering Philip's throne to the House of Braganza.

== Fall from power ==
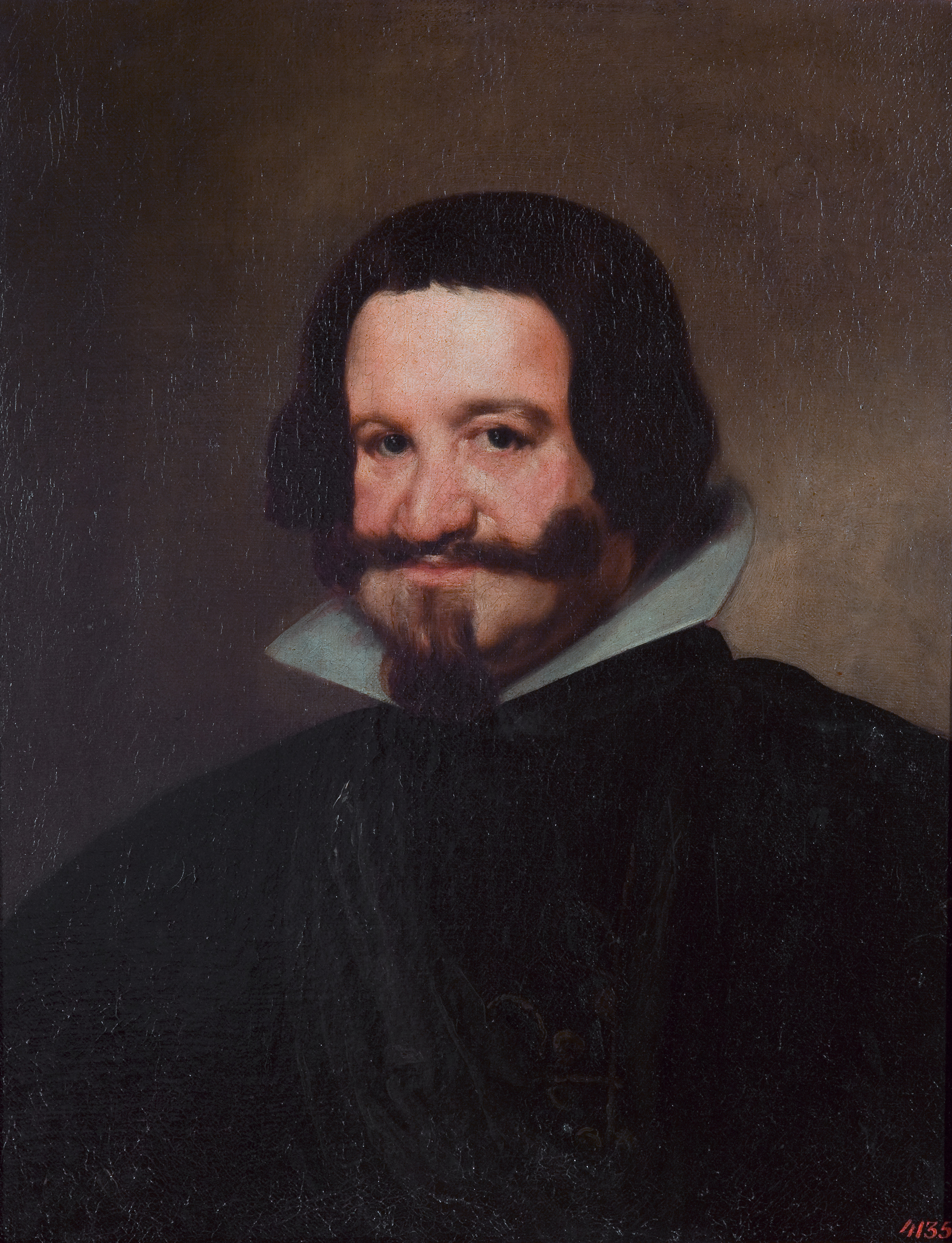
Olivares, 1635; tired, swollen and markedly aged at 48, 14 years since his previous portrait, by Velázquez.

Olivares' fall from power occurred for several reasons. The revolts in Catalonia and Portugal proved the immediate factor, placing the stability of Spain itself in doubt, but other factors played a part. Olivares increasingly suffered from mental illness in his later years, and was no longer as effective an administrator as he had once been. He had also increasingly alienated the other Castilian nobility. His use of juntas – committees – packed with his own men, irritated many. Olivares was also largely blamed by contemporaries for the new royal palace of Buen Retiro, the huge cost of which appeared to fly in the face of the wider austerity measures Olivares had championed in the 1630s. 1641 had seen a disastrous bout of inflation, causing economic chaos. More generally the Spanish people held his favourite responsible for the numerous misfortunes of the country in the 1640s.

Olivares did not let go of power readily. He attempted to use art and theatre in the 1630s to shore up his waning popularity amongst the elite but without success, although he was able to overcome the attempts of Gaspar Alfonso Pérez de Guzmán, 9th Duke of Medina Sidonia, whose family was a traditional enemy of the Counts of Olivares, to remove him from power in the Andalusian revolt in 1641. By the following year, his situation was weakening as the Catalan revolt dragged on.

Olivares' nephew and favoured successor, along with Olivares' daughter and young baby had all died in 1626, and in the absence of other children he chose to legitimate his bastard son, Don Enrique Felipez de Guzman in 1641. In doing so he had effectively disinherited another nephew and heir, causing huge family tensions within the upper echelons of Castilian society. The King himself noted that it might be necessary to sacrifice Olivares' life in order to divert unpopularity from the royal house. The end was near, but the King parted with him reluctantly in January 1643, and only under the pressure of a court intrigue headed by Queen Isabel.

He retired by the King's order first to Loeches, where he published an apology under the title of El Nicandro, which was perhaps written by an agent but was undeniably inspired by the fallen minister. El Nicandro was denounced to the Inquisition, and it is not impossible that Olivares might have ended in the prisons of the Holy Office, or on the scaffold, if he had not died beforehand of natural causes. His rivals felt that Loeches remained too close to the court, and he was moved onto his sister's palace at Toro.

He endeavoured to satisfy his passion for work, partly by sharing in the municipal government of the town and the regulation of its commons, woods and pastures. He died, increasingly consumed by madness, in 1645. The Olivares library was not preserved as he had instructed after his death, and his collection of private and state papers was largely destroyed in an 18th-century fire.

The Count-Duke became, and for long remained, in the opinion of his countrymen, the accepted model of a grasping and incapable favorite, although this commonly held opinion about his personality has changed. His personal reputation has traditionally been portrayed unfavorably, especially compared to his French contemporary, Cardinal Richelieu, a trend which began in the 18th century.

== See also ==
- History of Spain
- Thirty Years' War
- Portrait of the Count-Duke of Olivares (disambiguation)

== Sources ==
- Aercke, Kristiaan P. The Gods of Play: Baroque Festive Performances as Rhetorical Discourse. Albany: State University of New York Press. (1994)
- Anderson, M. S. War and Society in Europe of the Old Regime, 1618–1789. London: Fontana. (1988)
- Armstrong, Walter, edited by Philip Gilbert Hamerton (1896). The Portfolio: Monographs on Artistic Subjects, Issues 28–30. London: Seeley and Co. Limited and New York: The Macmillan Co.
- Brown, Jonathan, and John H. Elliott. A Palace for a King: The Buen Retiro and the Court of Philip IV (revised and expanded edition). New Haven: Yale University Press. (2004) ISBN 978-0-300-10185-0
- Brown, Jonathan, and Carmen Garrido. Velazquez: The Technique of Genius. New Haven: Yale University Press. (1998) ISBN 978-0-300-07293-8
- Corteguera, Luis R. For the Common Good: Popular Politics in Barcelona, 1580–1640. Ithaca: Cornell University Press. (2002)
- Elliott, J. H. The Statecraft of Olivares. in Elliot and Koenisburger (eds) 1970.
- Elliott, J. H. The Revolt of the Catalans: A Study in the Decline of Spain, 1598–1640. Cambridge: Cambridge University Press. (1984)
- Elliott, J. H. The Count-Duke of Olivares. The Statesman in an Age of Decline. Yale University: New Haven. (1986)
- Elliott, J. H. Richelieu and Olivares. Cambridge: Canto Press. (1991)
- Elliott, J. H. and H. G. Koenisburger (ed). The Diversity of History: Essays in Honour of Sir Henry Butterfield. London: Routledge and Kegan Paul. (1970)
- Kamen, Henry. Spain, 1469–1714: A Society of Conflict. Harlow: Pearson Education. (2005)
- Mackay, Ruth. The Limits of Royal Authority: Resistance and Authority in Seventeenth Century Castile. Cambridge: Cambridge University Press. (1999)
- Munck, Thomas. Seventeenth Century Europe, 1598–1700. London: Macmillan. (1990)
- Parker, Geoffrey. Europe in Crisis, 1598–1648. London: Fontana. (1984)
- Parker, Geoffrey. The Dutch Revolt. London: Pelican Books. (1985)
- Polisensky, J. V. The Thirty Years War. London: NEL. (1971)
- Schama, Simon. The Embarrassment of Riches: An Interpretation of Dutch Culture in the Golden Age. London: Fontana. (1991)
- Stradling, R. A. Olivaries and the origins of the Franco-Spanish war, 1627–1635. in English Historical Review ci (1986).
- de Vallory, Guillaime. Anecdotes du Ministere du Comte-Duc d'Olivares. Paris. (1722) (in French)
- Wedgewood, C. V. The Thirty Years' War. London: Methuen. (1981)
- Zagorin, Perez. Rebels and Rulers, 1500–1660. Volume II: Provincial rebellion: Revolutionary civil wars, 1560–1660. Cambridge: Cambridge University Press. (1992)
- This article incorporates text from a publication now in the public domain: Chisholm, Hugh, ed. (1911). "Olivares, Gaspar de Guzman". Encyclopædia Britannica. Vol. 20 (11th ed.). Cambridge University Press. pp. 84–85.

Spanish nobility
Preceded by Enrique de Guzmán	Count of Olivares	Succeeded by Enrique Felipe de Guzmán
Preceded by New creation	Duke of Sanlúcar	Succeeded by Enrique Felipe de Guzmán
