= Gerena =

- Municipality
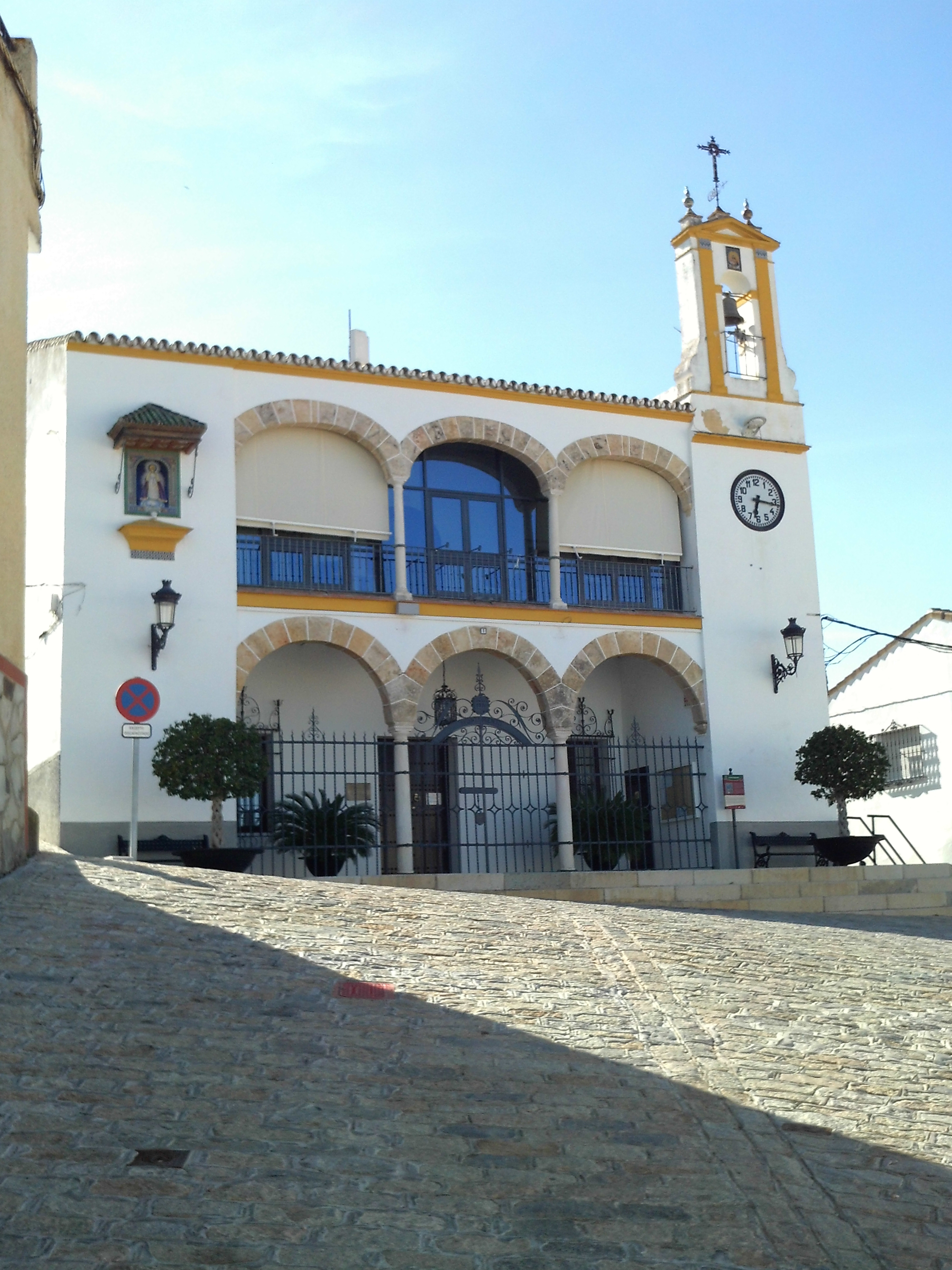
- Town hall

- Flag Coat of arms

- Location within Spain
- Coordinates: 37.517°N 6.150°W
- Country: Spain
- Autonomous community: Andalusia
- Province: Seville
- Comarca: Sierra Norte
- Municipality: Gerena

Population (2025-01-01)
  - Total: 7,971

Gerena is a municipality in the Province of Seville, Andalusia, Spain. It is 25 km northwest of the provincial capital, Seville, and 10 km north of Olivares.

== See also ==
- List of municipalities in Seville
