= Albaida del Aljarafe =

- Flag Coat of arms

- Location in Spain.
- Coordinates: 37°26′N 6°10′W
- Country: Spain
- Autonomous community: Andalusia

Area
  - Total: 11 km^{2} (4.2 sq mi)
- Elevation: 162 m (531 ft)

Population (2025-01-01)
  - Total: 3,220
  - Density: 290/km^{2} (760/sq mi)
- Time zone: UTC+1 (CET)
  - Summer (DST): UTC+2 (CEST)
- Website: www.albaidadelaljarafe.es

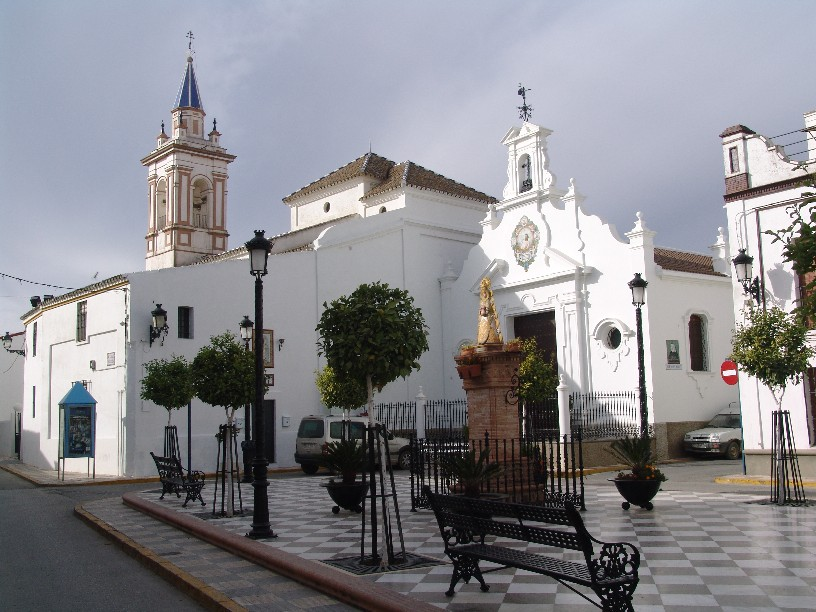
Plaza de España, Albaida del Aljarafe

Albaida del Aljarafe is a municipality in Seville. It had a population of approximately 3,084 people in 2013, up from 2,231 in 2005. It has architecture from the Roman and pre-Roman eras. Much of its industry is agricultural, with the main crop being olives.

Member of the European Parliament Soledad Cabezón Ruiz was mayor of the municipality from 2003–2011.

== See also ==
- List of municipalities in Seville
