= Aznalcóllar =

- city
- Flag Coat of arms

- Location in Spain.
- Coordinates: 37°31′N 6°16′W
- Country: Spain
- Province: Seville
- Comarca: Sierra Norte de Sevilla

Government
  - Mayor: Juan José Fernández Garrido

Area
  - Total: 199 km^{2} (77 sq mi)
- Elevation: 155 m (509 ft)

Population (2025-01-01)
  - Total: 6,096
  - Density: 30.6/km^{2} (79.3/sq mi)
- Demonym(s): Aznalcollero, -a
- Time zone: UTC+1 (CET)
  - Summer (DST): UTC+2 (CEST)

Aznalcóllar is a city located in the province of Seville, southern Spain. It is located at the feet of the Sierra Morena.

== Aznalcollar mine ==
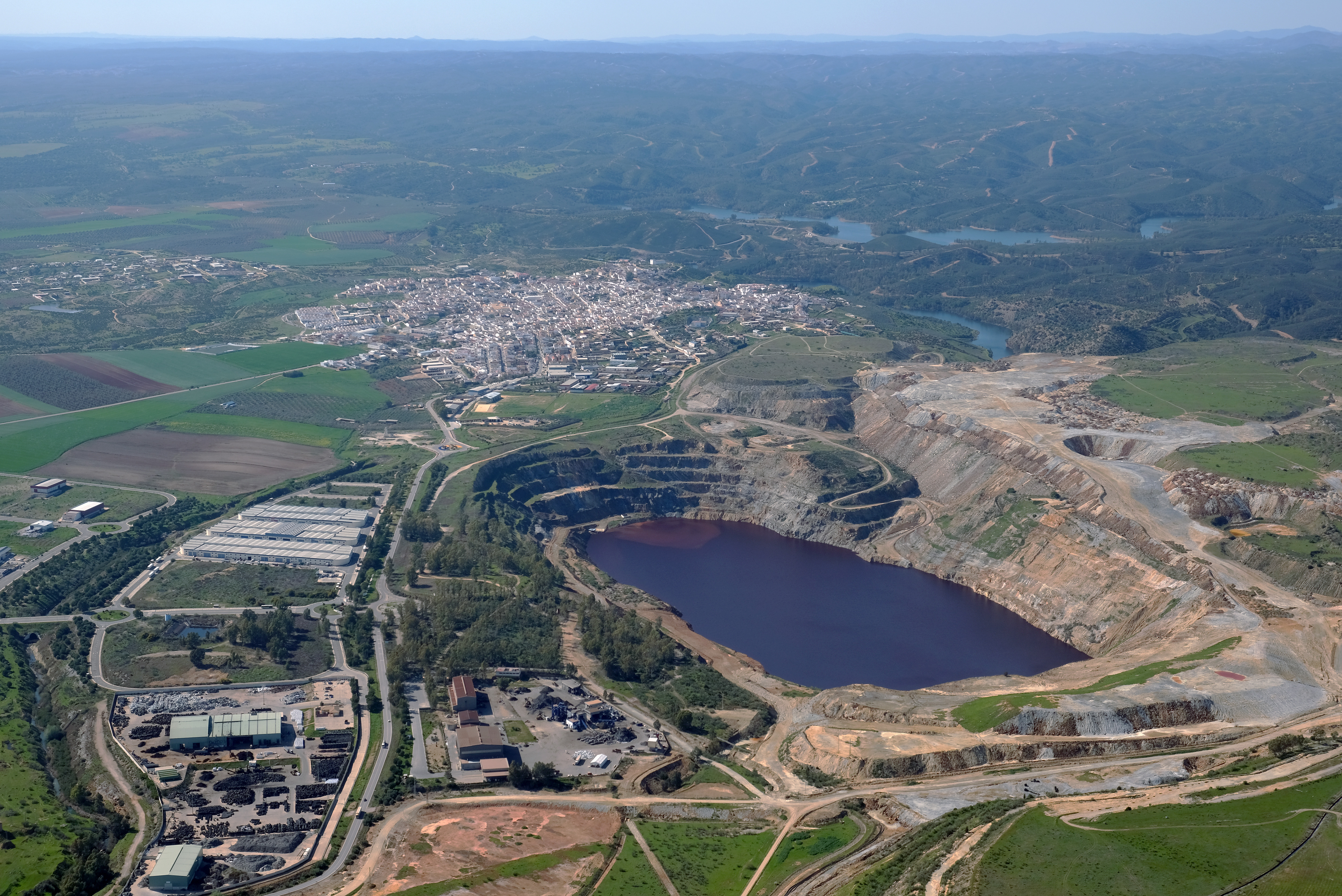
Aznalcóllar mine.

The Boliden mine produces around 125,000 tonnes of zinc and 2.9 million ounces of silver per year.

The residue pool at the mine burst in late April 1998 sending a toxic wave into Doñana National Park, one of Europe's largest nature reserves. The spill caused damage over an area of around 30 kilometres, destroying rare plant and wildlife.

== See also ==
- List of municipalities in Seville
