= European route E1 in Spain =

The European route E1 in Spain is a series of roads, part of the International E-road network running in two parts through the Southern European country. The first part runs completely through the Autonomous community of Galicia in Northwestern Spain. The E1 arrives from the United Kingdom and the Republic of Ireland by a non-existent ferry route between Rosslare Harbour and Ferrol. From there it runs to the Portuguese border. After crossing Portugal all the way to the south, the E1 starts with the second Spanish part after crossing the border at the Guadiana river. The highway runs only through Andalusia until it ends at the city of Seville.

== Route ==
The first part starts at the city of Ferrol at the Bay of Biscay. From there it follows the AP-9 motorway passing close by A Coruña before it goes to the capital and pilgrimage destination of Santiago de Compostela. After running through the green hills and passing Pontevedra, it arrives in the largest city of Galicia Vigo. The AP-9 motorway stops at the Autovía A-55 near Tui. Eventually the E1 crosses the border with Portugal on the Minho river. This is one of the most important highways in Galicia as it connects the largest cities on the Atlantic coast. After the Portuguese interruption, the Spanish part of the E1 starts again at the Guadiana river in Ayamonte entering Andalusia. It passes the major city of Huelva following the A-49 until the Andalusian capital Seville. It covers a total distance of 337 km (209 mi) within Spain.

== Detailed route ==
E1 Galicia
Province	National road number	Section	Junction
(European Union) (Republic of Ireland) (Leinster)	Sea route Rosslare Harbour-Ferrol	Ireland towards Rosslare Harbour and Dublin	
(European Union) (Spain) (Galicia (Spain)) A Coruña	Autopista AP-9 'Autopista del Atlántico'	Ferrol-Padrón	Ferrol N-651, FE-13, AC-646 A Coruña, Catabois, Cedeira, Ortigueira 34F AC-862, AC-566, FE-12, AG-64, N-655 As Pontes de García Rodríguez, Narón, Rio do Pozo 33F FE-11, AC-862 Ortigueira, Xuvia, A Gándara 31F AC-115 Fene, Neda 27F-B N-651 Fene, Ferrol 27F-A N-651, VG-1.2, AC-563 Betanzos, Pontedeume, Ares, Mugardos, As Pontes 25F VG-1.2, AC-563 Vilar do Colo, Ares, Mugardos, As Pontes de García Rodríguez Pereiro 21F N-651, AC-122, AC-564 Cabanas, Pontedeume, Mugardos, Ares, As Pontes de García Rodríguez Services of Miño 12F CP-4803 Miño, Perbes 2F-A N-VI Betanzos, Guísamo, Oleiros 2F-B Bergondo, Sada AP-9 towards A Coruña, Santiago de Compostela, Lugo, Arteixo A Coruña 16 A-6 E70 towards Lugo, Arteixo, Ponferrada, Valladolid, Madrid Parking near Betanzos Services of Ameixeira 41 AC-524, N-634, N-550 Ordes, Mesía, Curtis, Boimorto, Vilasantar, Sobrado, Frades, Carballo Santiago de Compostela North 55 N-550 Sigüeiro, Oroso, Trazo, Santiago de Compostela Airport Parking near Sigüeiro 67 SC-20, A-54 Santiago de Compostela North, Santiago de Compostela Airport, Arzúa 72 AP-53, AG-59, N-525, AC-841, SC-11 Santiago de Compostela East, Ourense, Lalín, A Estrada, Madrid 75 AG-56, SC-20 Santiago de Compostela Center, Noia, Milladoiro, Ames Santiago de Compostela South Services of Santiago de Compostela 92 AG-11, N-550 Ribeira, Padrón, Pontecesures, Boiro
Pontevedra	Autopista AP-9 'Autopista del Atlántico'	Padrón-Tui	104 EP-8001, N-550 Catoira, Ribeira, Valga 110 N-640 Caldas de Reis, Vilagarcía de Arousa, A Estrada Services of Salnes 119 AG-41 Cambados, Sanxenxo, O Grove, Meis Pontevedra North 129 PO-531, PO-308 Pontevedra North, Poio 132A PO-11 Pontevedra South, Marín 132B N-550, N-541 Pontevedra, Ourense Parking near Balteiro Pontevedra South 137 N-550 Redondela, Vilaboa, Soutomaior Services of San Simón 146 N-554, PO-551, CG-4.1 Vilaboa, Moaña, Cangas, Bueu AP-9v, N-552 Vigo, Teis, Chapela 157 N-555, N-120 Vigo–Peinador Airport, Redondela, Mos, Puxeiros 159A A-55 Vigo 159B A-55, A-52 O Porriño, Tui, Mos, Ourense, Valladolid, Madrid 161 AG-57, VG-20 Vigo, Baiona, Gondomar, Nigrán 168 A-55, A-52 O Porriño, Ourense O Porriño
Pontevedra	Autovía A-55 'Autovia del Atlántico'	Tui	A-55 Tui North, Vigo, Pontevedra, A Coruña 29 PO-340 Tui West, Gondomar, Baiona 30 Tui South, Tomiño, O Rosal, A Guarda
(European Union) (Portugal) Norte Region	A3 motorway	Portugal towards Porto and Lisbon	

E1 Andalusia
Province	National road number	Section	Junction
(European Union) (Portugal) Algarve	A22 motorway	Portugal towards Faro and Lisbon	
(European Union) (Spain) (Andalusia) Huelva	Autovía A-49 'Autovía del Quinto Centenario'	Ayamonte-Chucena	131 Ayamonte North, beaches 129 N-431 Ayamonte East 125 A-499, N-431 Villablanca, San Silvestre de Guzmán 122 N-446 Isla Cristina 117 N-445, HU-4400 Lepe West, Villablanca, beaches 113 N-444 Lepe East, Cartaya West, beaches 105 HU-3401, HU-3402 Cartaya East, San Bartolomé de la Torre, Tariquejo, beaches Services of Cartaya 99 N-431, A-492 Huelva West, Aljaraque, Punta Umbría, beaches 94 N-431 Gibraleón West 87 N-431 Huelva North, Gibraleón 81 N-431 Huelva, La Ribera, La Alqueria 77 H-31 Huelva center 75 A-494, N-435 San Juan del Puerto, Moguer, Trigueros, Valverde del Camino, Badajoz Services of Trigueros 60 A-5001, A-484 Niebla, Bonares 53 HU-4102 Rociana del Condado, Villarrasa 50 A-483 Almonte, Doñana National Park 48 A-493 Bollullos Par del Condado, La Palma del Condado, Valverde del Camino, Villalba del Alcor Services of Chucena 34 A-481 Chucena, Hinojos, Manzanilla, Paterna del Campo, Escacena del Campo
Seville	Autovía A-49 'Autovía del Quinto Centenario'	Chucena-Seville	28 A-8061, SE-637 Pilas, Villamanrique de la Condesa, Carrión de los Céspedes, Castilleja del Campo 23 A-8064, SE-638 Huévar del Aljarafe 16 A-473 Benacazón, Sanlúcar la Mayor, Olivares, Aznalcóllar 14 SE-3308 Benacazón, Umbrete, Espartinas, Villanueva del Ariscal, Olivares 11 A-8059 Bollullos de la Mitación, Umbrete, Espartinas, Villanueva del Ariscal, Olivares 5 A-8062 Gines, Bormujos, Mairena del Aljarafe, Valencina de la Concepción 3 A-474 Bormujos, Castilleja de la Cuesta, Castilleja de Guzmán 2 SE-3403 Castilleja de la Cuesta, Tomares, San Juan de Aznalfarache 1B Tomares 1 A-8077, N-630 Camas, San Juan de Aznalfarache, Coria del Río 0B SE-30 Coria del Río, Dos Hermanas, Cádiz, Granada, Málaga, Algeciras 0A SE-30 Córdoba, Mérida, Seville Airport Seville
