= Autopista AP-53 =

Autopista AP-53

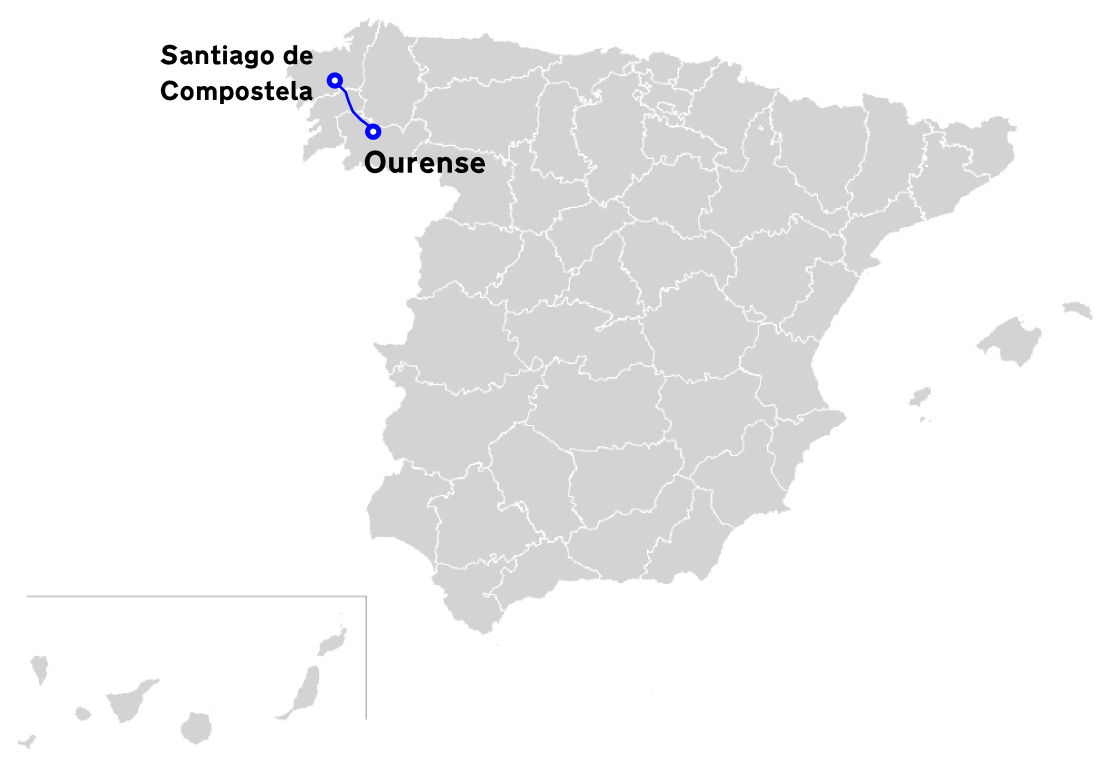

Route information
- Length: 101 km (63 mi)

Major junctions
- From: Santiago
- To: Ourense

Location
- Country: Spain

Highway system
- Highways in Spain; Autopistas and autovías; National Roads

The Autopista A-53 is a highway in north western Spain. It links Santiago de Compostela to Ourense and follows the N-525. It starts to the south east of Santiago at a junction with the Autopista AP-9 (72 km). It passes the Castle Pazo de Oca and Lalín. Thereafter the road has yet to be built and in the Serra do Faro the road as the N-525 crosses a pass at 810 m, under the Pico Seco. At Ourense there are junctions with the Autovía A-52 and N-120.
