= Autovía A-57 =

Road in Spain

Autovía A-57

Route information
- Length: 26 km (16 mi)

Major junctions
- From: Barro
- To: O Confurco, Ponteareas

Location
- Country: Spain

Highway system
- Highways in Spain; Autopistas and autovías; National Roads

The Autovía A-57 is a highway in western Spain to the south of Pontevedra.

== Sections ==
Denomination	Section	Kilometres	Service Year / Status (2020)
AC-14	La Coruña - Ledoño Autovía A-6	10,2	Lonzas-A Zapateira section: 2015 A Zapateira-Ledoño section: 2011
	Ledoño ( Autovía A-6 ) - Ordes Norte	-	Pending new study
	Ordes Norte - Ordes Sur	12,2	Pending new study
	Ordes Sur - Sigüeiro Sur	11	Pending new study
	Sigüeiro Sur - Padrón Norte	35	Pending new study
	Padrón Norte - Valga	6,2	Pending new study
	Valga - Barro	-	Pending new study
	Barro (Conexión Autopista AP-9 , AG-47 y AG-41 ) - Pilarteiros	10,2	Pending new study
	Pilarteiros - A Ermida (Pontevedra ring road section 2)	5,04	Completed information study (submitted public information)
	A Ermida - Vilaboa (Pontevedra ring road section)	6,48	Under construction (planned opening 2021 or 2022)
	Vilaboa - Soutomaior (connection A-59)	7,5	In project writing (project awarded, 09/09/2009)
	Soutomaior - Pazos de Borbén	6,1	In project writing (awarded project, 08/07/2008)
	Pazos de Borbén - Padróns	7,1	In project writing (awarded project, 04/02/2009)
	Padróns - O Confurco (Ponteareas Autovía A-52 )	7,2	In project writing (awarded project, 04/02/2009)
