= Valga =

Valga may refer to:

- Valga, Estonia, a town in Estonia, and its twin town Valka in Latvia
- Valga, Galicia, a town in Galicia, Spain
- Valga County, one of 15 counties of Estonia
