= Joaquín Lluch y Garriga =

Spanish prelate

His Eminence Joaquín Lluch y Garriga OCD
- Archbishop of Seville
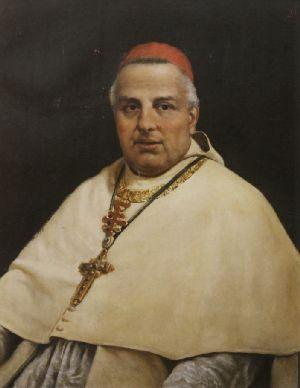
- Church: Roman Catholic Church
- Archdiocese: Seville
- See: Seville
- Appointed: 22 June 1877
- Term ended: 23 September 1882
- Predecessor: Luis de la Lastra y Cuesta
- Successor: Ceferino González y Díaz Tuñón
- Previous posts: Bishop of Islas Canarias (1858-68); Bishop of Salamanca (1868-74); Apostolic Administrator of Ciudad Rodrigo (1868-74); Bishop of Barcelona (1874-77)

Orders
- Ordination: 1838
- Consecration: 12 December 1858 by Florencio Llorente y Montón
- Created cardinal: 27 March 1882 by Pope Leo XIII
- Rank: Cardinal-Priest

Personal details
- Born: Joaquín Jacinto Francisco Lluch y Garriga; 22 February 1816 Manresa, Kingdom of Spain
- Died: 23 September 1882 (aged 66) Umbrete, Seville, Spanish Kingdom
- Buried: Seville Cathedral
- Parents: Antonio Lluch; Mariana Garriga
- Motto: In fide et lenitate

Joaquín Lluch y Garriga, OCD (22 February 1816 – 23 September 1882) was a Spanish prelate of the Catholic Church who was bishop of the Canary Islands from 1858 to 1868, bishop of Salamanca from 1868 to 1874, bishop of Barcelona from 1874 to 1877, and archbishop of Seville from 1877 until his death in 1886. He was made a cardinal in 1882.

== Biography ==
Joaquín Jacinto Lluch y Garriga was born in Manresa, Spain, on 22 February 1816. He studied in Manresa and after 1822 in Barcelona. He entered the order of Discalced Carmelites on 2 November 1830 and took his vows on 27 February 1832. In 1835, when the Spanish government began expropriating monasteries and forcing them to close, he left Spain and eventually settled in Lucca, where he completed his studies and was ordained a priest in 1838. In Lucca, he was master of novices and directed spiritual exercises; he taught philosophy, theology, and French.

When the Italian governments suppressed the Carmelite monasteries, he returned to Barcelona in 1847 without the possibility of continuing to live a monastic life. He fulfilled pastoral assignments, worked as a professor and seminary administrator, and held leadership roles within the Carmelites.

Queen Isabel II proposed him for bishop of the Canary Islands on 22 September 1858. He received his episcopal consecration on 12 December 1858 from Florentino Llorente Montón, Bishop of Girona. He was transferred to the see of Salamanca on 13 March 1868. (Note: Because the Concordat of 1851 anticipated the suppression certain dioceses, Lluch y Garriga was for some periods the apostolic administrator of San Cristóbal de La Laguna while in the Canaries and of Ciudad Rodrigo while in Salamanca. Some reports of the First Vatican Council identify him as either bishop or apostolic administrator of Ciudad Rodrigo.) He participated in the First Vatican Council in 1869-1870, where he proved one of the more eloquent spokesmen for conservatism. He advocated for requiring bishops to make pastoral visitation at least every three years and tried to soften language about the sins of the clergy.

He was transferred to the see of Barcelona on 16 January 1874. King Alfonso XII proposed him for the archdiocese of Sevilla on 7 May 1877 and Pope Pius made the appointment on 22 June 1877.

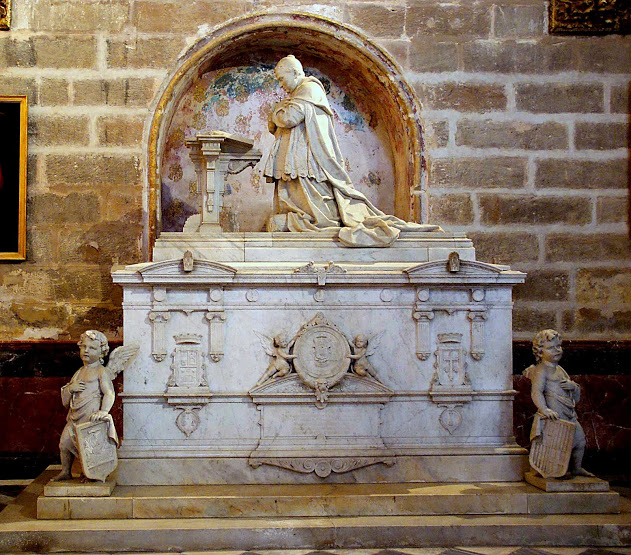
Tomb of Lluch y Garriga in Seville cathedral

Pope Leo XIII made him a cardinal priest on 27 March 1882.

He died six months later on 23 September 1882 in Umbrete, a village outside of Seville where the Archbishop's Palace served as his summer residence. He was interred in the chapel of Saint Lauriano in the Cathedral of Seville. He had not travelled to Rome to receive his cardinal's red galero and be assigned his titular church.
