= Payo Juan Manuel =

Spanish guitarist

- Born: Juan Manuel Cardona Bonilla; 3 October 1941; Espartinas, Spain
- Died: 16 October 2014 (aged 73); Barcelona, Spain
- Occupations: Flamenco singer and composer

Juan Manuel Cardona Bonilla (3 October 1941 – 16 October 2014), better known by his stage name Payo Juan Manuel, was a Spanish singer, guitarist and composer of Romani origin.

== Biography ==
Born in Espartinas in the province of Seville, he emigrated with his family to Barcelona at an early age, where he began to train musically and recorded his first songs. In the 1980s, he moved to Jaén, where he spent much of the rest of his life and continued his artistic career, combined with the attention to his bar "El Rincón del Payo".

Considered a very prolific singer of flamenco and Catalan rumba, with more than 700 songs, much of his popularity was due to songs like Una vieja y un viejo and his appearance on television programs such as Crónicas marcianas.

He died on 16 October 2014, at the age of 73, in Barcelona. He was buried in Santa Coloma de Gramenet, according to his will.

== Partial discography ==
- Sola, Sola Está (Discophon, 1972)
- Haiki, tu mandas (Discophon, 1972)
- Rincón de España (Discophon, 1973)
- Makuka (Discophon, 1974)
- Rumbas del Payo Juan Manuel (Discophon, 1974)
- El Chinito / Que Te Estas Pasando (Zartos, 1975)
- Lairo Lairo / Playas Catalanas (Zartos, 1975)
- Enróllate María (Urogallo, 1978)
- Una Vieja Y Un Viejo Se Van P'al Banco … (Discobal, 1981)
- Dallas "Follón" (Olympo, 1982)
- Son Son Sera - Hot Mix Rumba (Vidisco, 1989)
- El Rumbero Verde (Vale Music, compilation, 2004)
