= N-120 road (Spain) =

Highway in Spain

National road N-120
- Carretera nacional N-120
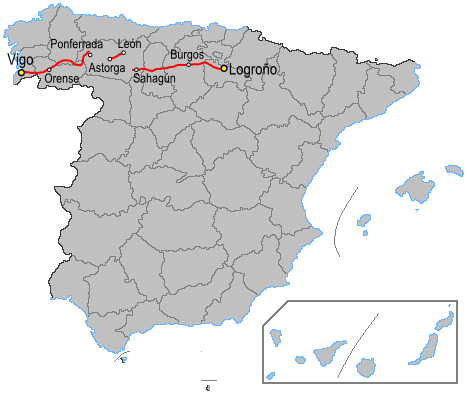

Route information
- Length: 662 km (411 mi)

Major junctions
- From: Logroño
- To: Vigo

Location
- Country: Spain

Highway system
- Highways in Spain; Autopistas and autovías; National Roads

The N-120 is a highway in northern Spain. It goes from Vigo to the Ebro Valley.

Starting on the Rías Bajas at Vigo, the city is connected on the Autopista AP-9, the Autovía A-57, Autovía A-55 and N-550. The N-120 heads east into the Sierra del Suido past the Mondariz Baneario and the Puerto de Fontefría (790m). Most traffic now takes the Autovía A-52, both roads enter the valley of Rio Miño to Ourense. The A-52 heads south with the N-525. The river heads north east along the valley past the Cañón del Sil before leaving the valley to the east past Monforte de Lemos and then back into the Rio Sil valley which passes the southern end of the Cordillera Cantábrica and the towns of La Rúa and Barco de Valdeorras. 13 km west of Ponferrada, the road meets and becomes the Autovía A-6.

The road passes through the Montes de León by the Puerto de Manzanal (1,221m). The N-VI runs parallel to the road. At Astorga the N-120 branches east to León alongside the Autopista AP-71. At León the road meets the N-630 and Autovía A-66. The N-120 merges with the Autovía A-231 heading east past the N-601. At Osorno la Mayor the road crosses the N-611 and the Río Pisuerga and the Canal de Castilla.

After the Rio Ubierna the road enters Burgos where there are junctions with the N-234, N-623 and Autovía A-1. The N-120 heads east passing north of the Sierra de la Demanda through the Montes de Oca by the Puerto de la Pedraja (1,150m). The road now heads through the Rioja region before entering the Ebro valley and Logroño. Here the road meets the N-111, N-232, Autovía A-12 and Autopista AP-68.
