= Benacazón =

- city
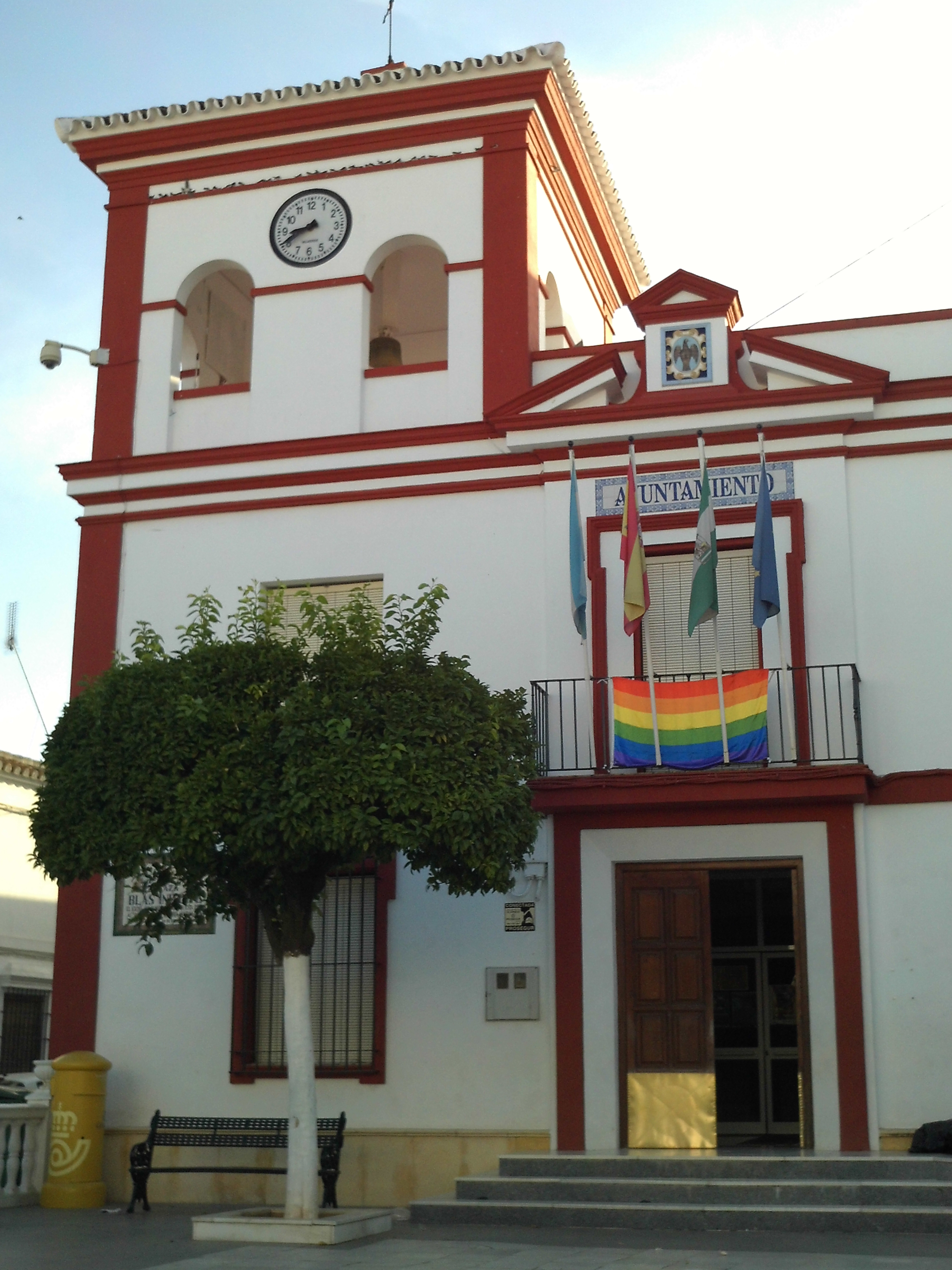
- Town hall

- Flag Coat of arms

- Location in Spain
- Coordinates: 37°21′N 6°11′W
- Country: Spain
- Province: Seville
- Comarca: Aljarafe

Government
  - Mayor: Juana María Carmona González

Area
  - Total: 32 km^{2} (12 sq mi)
- Elevation: 120 m (390 ft)

Population (2025-01-01)
  - Total: 7,363
  - Density: 230/km^{2} (600/sq mi)
- Demonym: Benacazoneros
- Time zone: UTC+1 (CET)
  - Summer (DST): UTC+2 (CEST)
- Website: Official website

Benacazón is a city located in the comarca of Aljarafe, in the province of Seville, southern Spain.

== Main sights ==
- Hermitage of Castilleja de Talhara, built in the 14th century, one of the most important Mudéjar churches in the Aljarafe.
- Hermitage of Gelo, also in Mudéjar style. It has a nave and two aisles, and is in brickwork construction.
- Parish church of Santa Maria de las Nieves (17th century).

== Festivals ==
During the patronal festival in honour of Nuestra Señora de las Nieves, on 5 August, the toro de fuego (literally, "fire bull") run through the streets of the city: a man dressed up as a bull, covered with sparklerson the back and horns, chases the people until it eventually explodes.

== See also ==
- List of municipalities in Seville
