= Caldas (comarca) =

Coordinates: 42°38′01″N 8°38′13″W

- Comarca
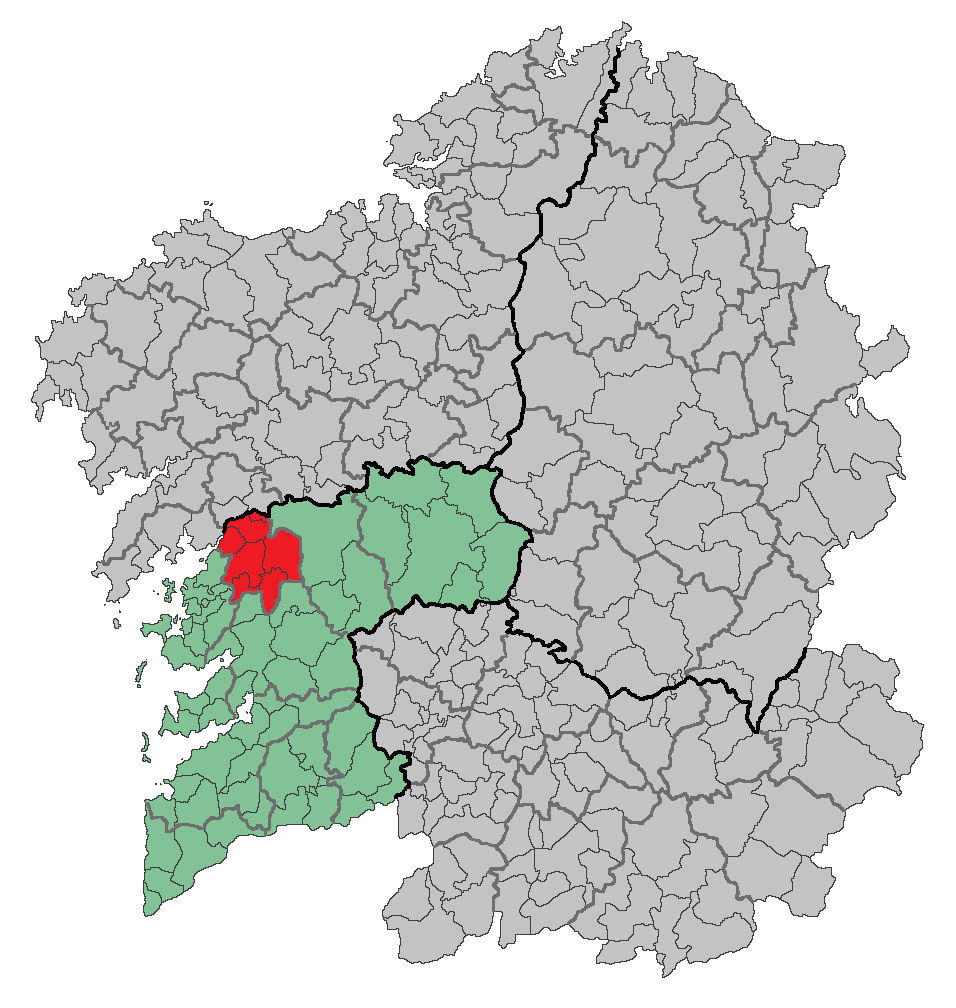
- Country: Spain
- Autonomous community: Galicia
- Province: Pontevedra
- Capital: Caldas de Reis
- Municipalities: List: Caldas de Reis, Catoira, Cuntis, Moraña, Pontecesures, Portas, Valga

Area
  - Total: 288.7 km^{2} (111.5 sq mi)

Population (2018)
  - Total: 34,067
  - Density: 118.0/km^{2} (305.6/sq mi)
- Time zone: UTC+1 (CET)
  - Summer (DST): UTC+2 (CEST)

Caldas is a comarca in the Galician Province of Pontevedra. It covers an area of 288.7 km^{2}, and the overall population of this comarca was 35,176 at the 2011 Census; the latest official estimate (as at the start of 2018) was 34,067.

== Municipalities ==
The comarca comprises the following seven municipalities:

Name of municipality	Population (2001)	Population (2011)	Population (2018)
Caldas de Reis	9,477	10,013	9,860
Catoira	3,451	3,499	3,349
Cuntis	5,530	4,998	4,710
Moraña	4,285	4,410	4,200
Pontecesures	2,940	3,132	3,037
Portas	3,205	3,073	2,984
Valga	6,196	6,051	5,927
Totals	35,084	35,176	34,067
