= Javier Vargas =

Javier Vargas may refer to:

- Javier Vargas (footballer) (born 1941), Mexican football goalkeeper
- Javier Vargas (musician) (born 1958), Spanish blues guitarist
- Javi Vargas (born 2001), Spanish football winger for Atlético Albacete
