= Villanueva del Ariscal =

Coordinates: 37°23′N 6°08′W

- Municipality
- Flag Coat of arms
- Interactive map of Villanueva del Ariscal
- Country: Spain
- Province: Seville
- Municipality: Villanueva del Ariscal

Area
  - Total: 5 km^{2} (1.9 sq mi)

Population (2025-01-01)
  - Total: 6,965
  - Density: 1,400/km^{2} (3,600/sq mi)
- Time zone: UTC+1 (CET)
  - Summer (DST): UTC+2 (CEST)

Villanueva del Ariscal is a town located in the Province of Seville, Spain. It has a population of 6,571 inhabitants (2018 INE). It is located between Olivares (to the north) and Espartinas (to the south). It also borders Sanlúcar la Mayor to the west.

== Gallery ==
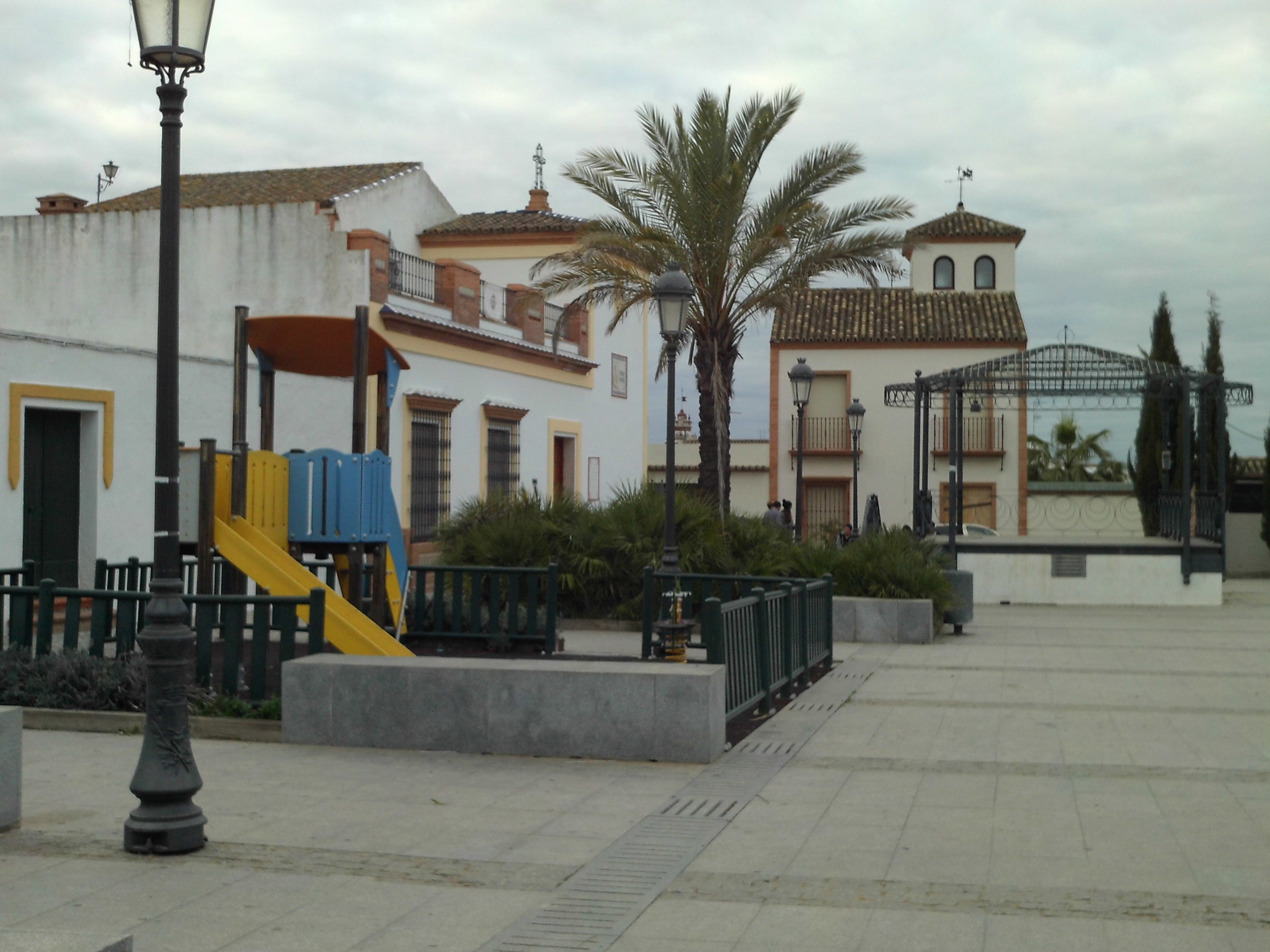
Plaza del Sacramento

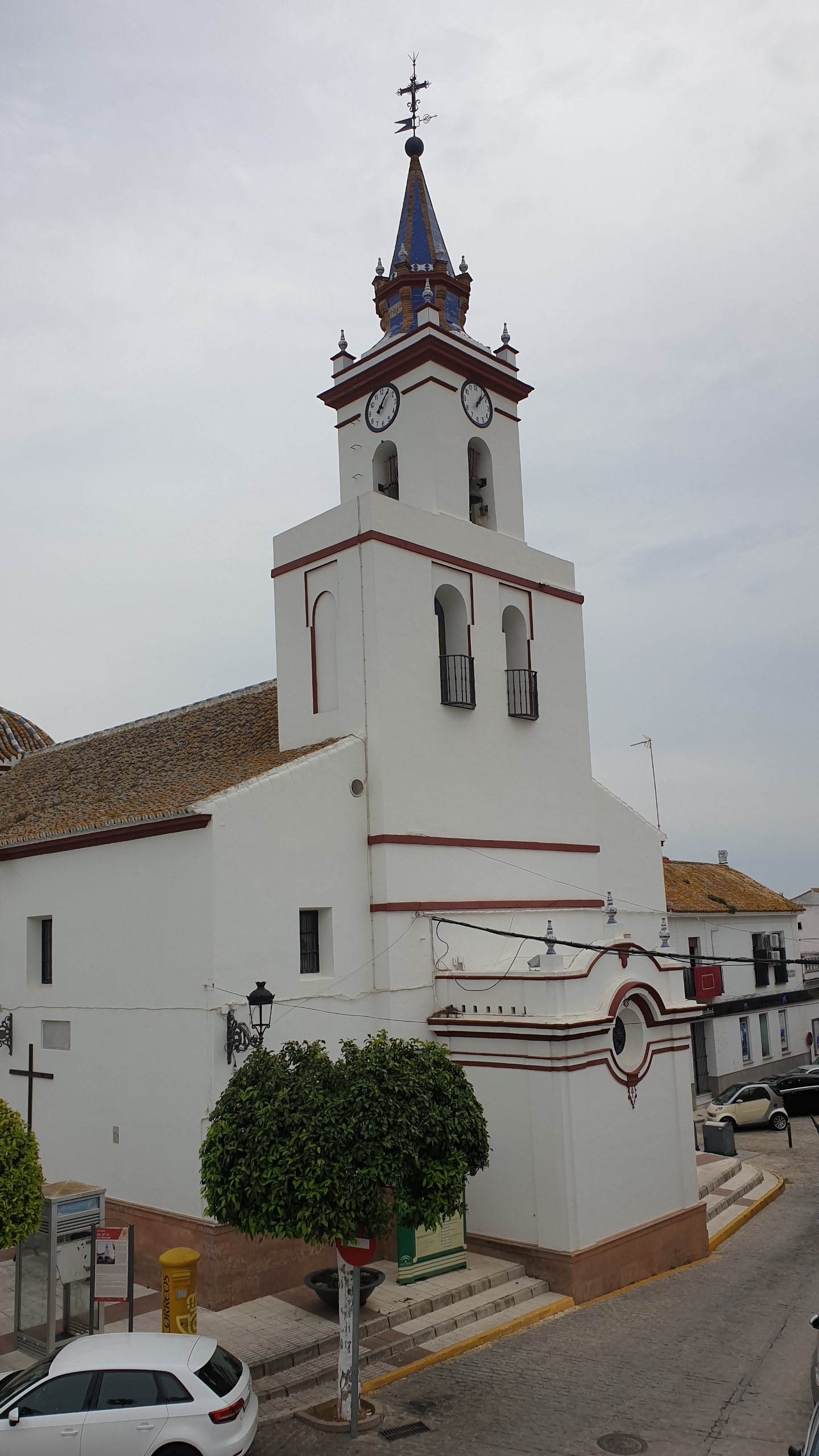
Church Tower, Iglesia Parroquial de Santa María de las Nieves

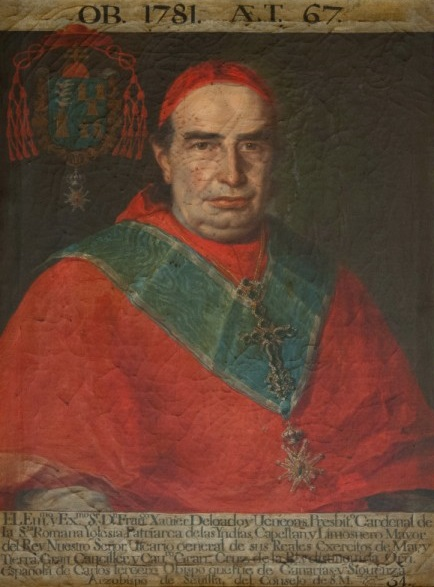
Portrait of Francisco Javier Delgado Venegas, archbishop of Seville, who (re)built the Church of Santa María de las Nieves in 1777

== See also ==
- List of municipalities in Seville
