= Portas =

- Municipality
- Coat of arms

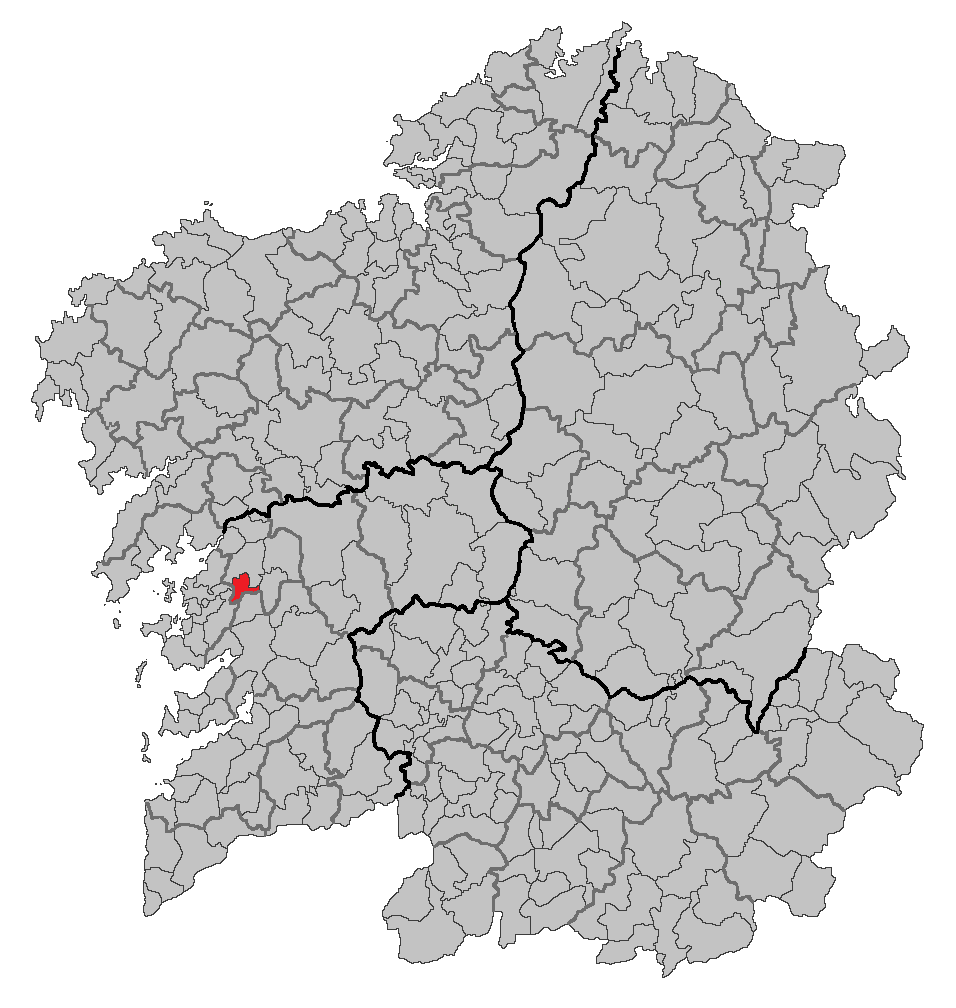
- Situation of Portas within Galicia

- Location within Spain Location within Galicia
- Country: Spain
- Autonomous community: Galicia
- Province: Pontevedra
- Comarca: Caldas

Government
  - Alcalde (Mayor): Ricardo Martínez Chantada (People's Party)

Area
  - Total: 22.71 km^{2} (8.77 sq mi)

Population (2024)
  - Total: 2,823
  - Density: 124.3/km^{2} (322.0/sq mi)
- Demonym: Portense/a
- Time zone: UTC+1 (CET)
  - Summer (DST): UTC+2 (CET)

Portas is a small municipality in the province of Pontevedra, in the autonomous community of Galicia, Spain. It belongs to the comarca of Caldas.

== Parroquias ==
It is made up of four parroquias (parishes):

- Briallos (San Cristóbal)
- Lantaño (San Pedro)
- Portas (Santa María)
- Romay (San Julián), home to the Romay fortress in Tras do Rio, an ancestral seat of the House of Romay.

== See also ==
- List of municipalities in Pontevedra
