= Dolmen de Soto =

Neolithic subterranean structure in Trigueros, Andalucía, Spain

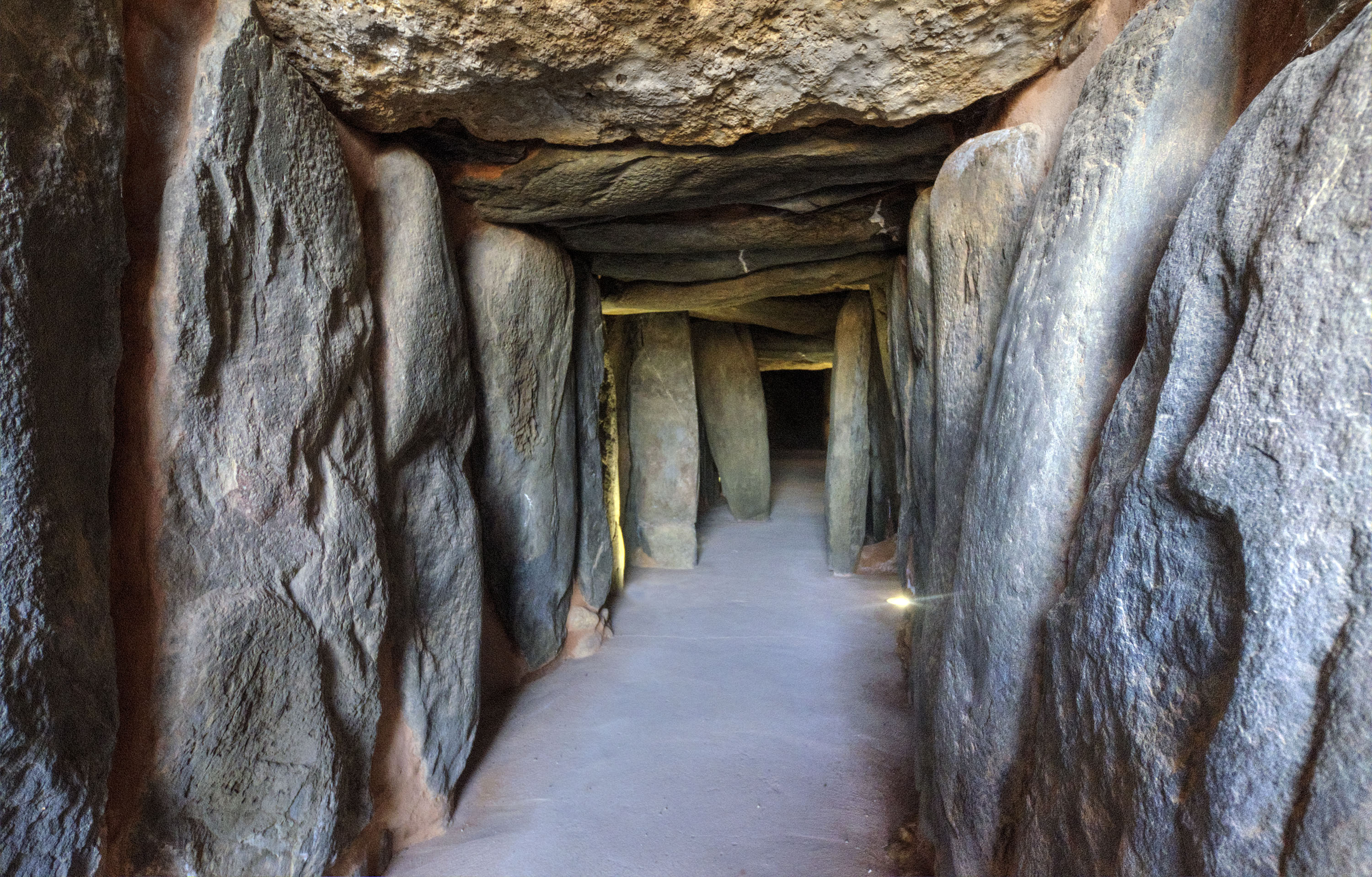
- Passage in the Dolmen de Soto
- Interactive map of Dolmen de Soto
- 37°21′08″N 06°45′05″W
- Type: Tomb
- Location: Andalusia, Spain

History
- Built: c. 2750 BC

Site notes
- Material: Limestone
- Discovered: 1922 by Armando Morillas

The Dolmen de Soto is a Neolithic subterranean tomb in Trigueros, Andalucía, Spain. It is estimated it was built between 2500 and 3000 BC and is one of about 200 neolithic ritual-burial sites in the province of Huelva.

== History ==
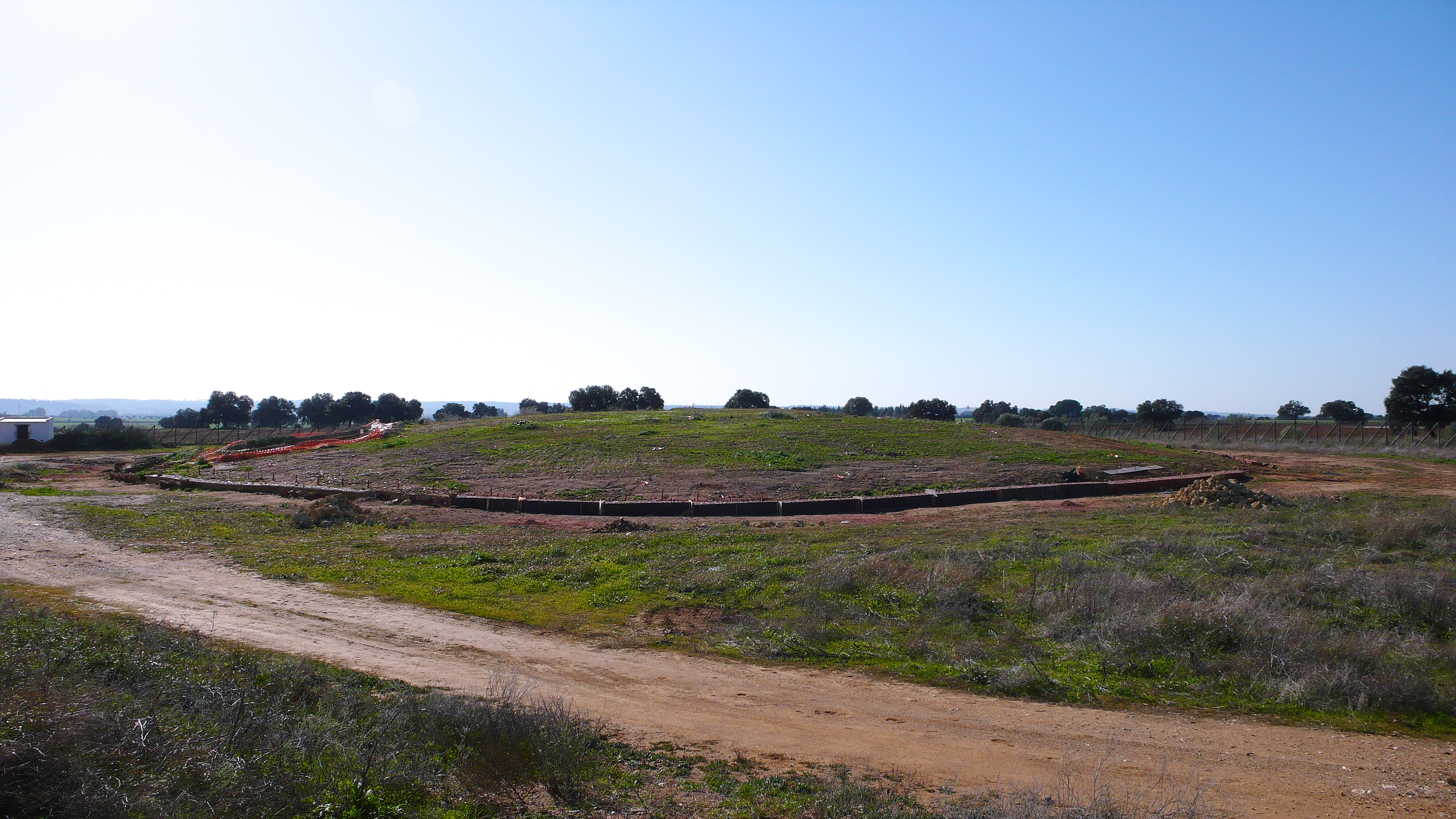
Surface of the Dolmen de Soto

The site was discovered by Armando de Soto Morillas, he wanted to build a new house in 1922 on his estate, La lobita. The same year, excavation work was initiated on the burial site, by 1924, the German archaeologist Hugo Obermaier was asked to perform some research by the Duke of Alba, Jacobo Fitz-James Stuart. Obermaier discovered eight buried bodies in a fetal position accompanied by artifacts following which Obermaier published a book describing the results of the excavation and the characteristics of the funerary site. In 1931, it was declared a National Monument of Spain, but it stayed a private property until 1987, when it was included within the jurisdiction of the Spanish Ministry of Culture. Recently, the First Art team, a Portuguese/Spanish/Welsh team undertook a comprehensive study on the engraved and painted uprights that stand within the passage and chamber areas of the monument. The results revealed a unique corpus of material. The results have been published in a large monograph and as a popular article in Current World Archaeology, a summary has also been posted on the Bradshaw Foundation website.

== Structure ==
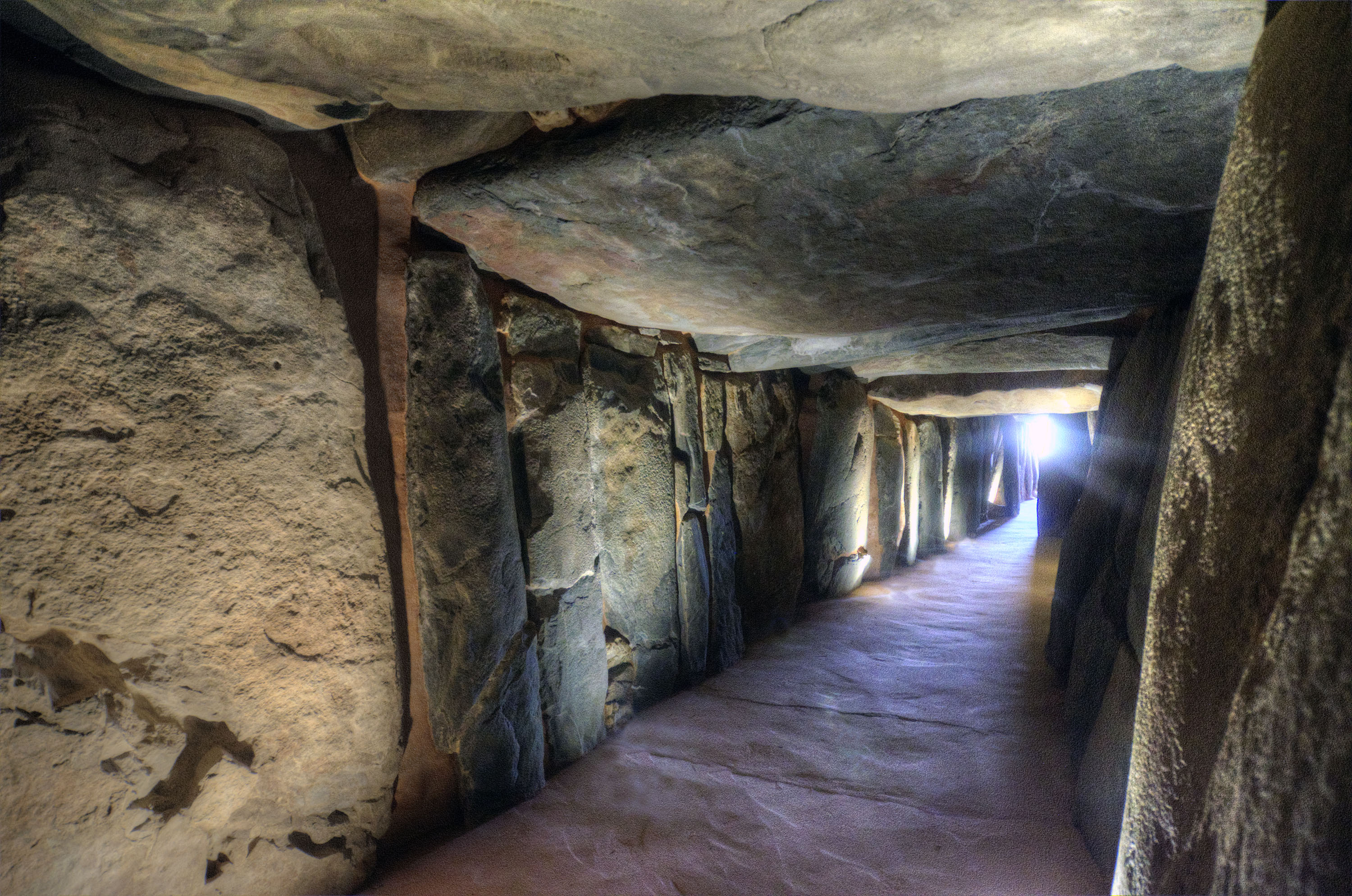
View towards the entrance

On the surface the site resembles a circlular mound with a diameter of 75 metres (246 ft). It has a V-shaped passage 20.9 metres (69 ft) long starting at the 0.8 metres (2 ft 7 in) wide,1.55 metres (5 ft 1 in) high western entrance, which expands to 3.1 metres (10 ft) wide and 3.9 metres (13 ft) high in the east. At the eastern end of the passage there is a chamber. During the equinox, the rising sun lights the interior of the passage and the chamber for some minutes, it is assumed this was to denote an eventual re-birth of the buried. Several of the standing-stones have engravings, it is viewed as one of the largest dolmens in Spain. The passage has 31 standing-stones in the northern part of the passage and 33 in the southern part. The standing stones are of quartzite, sandstone, and limestone and carry 20 capstones that make the roof of the passage.

== Artifacts and engravings ==
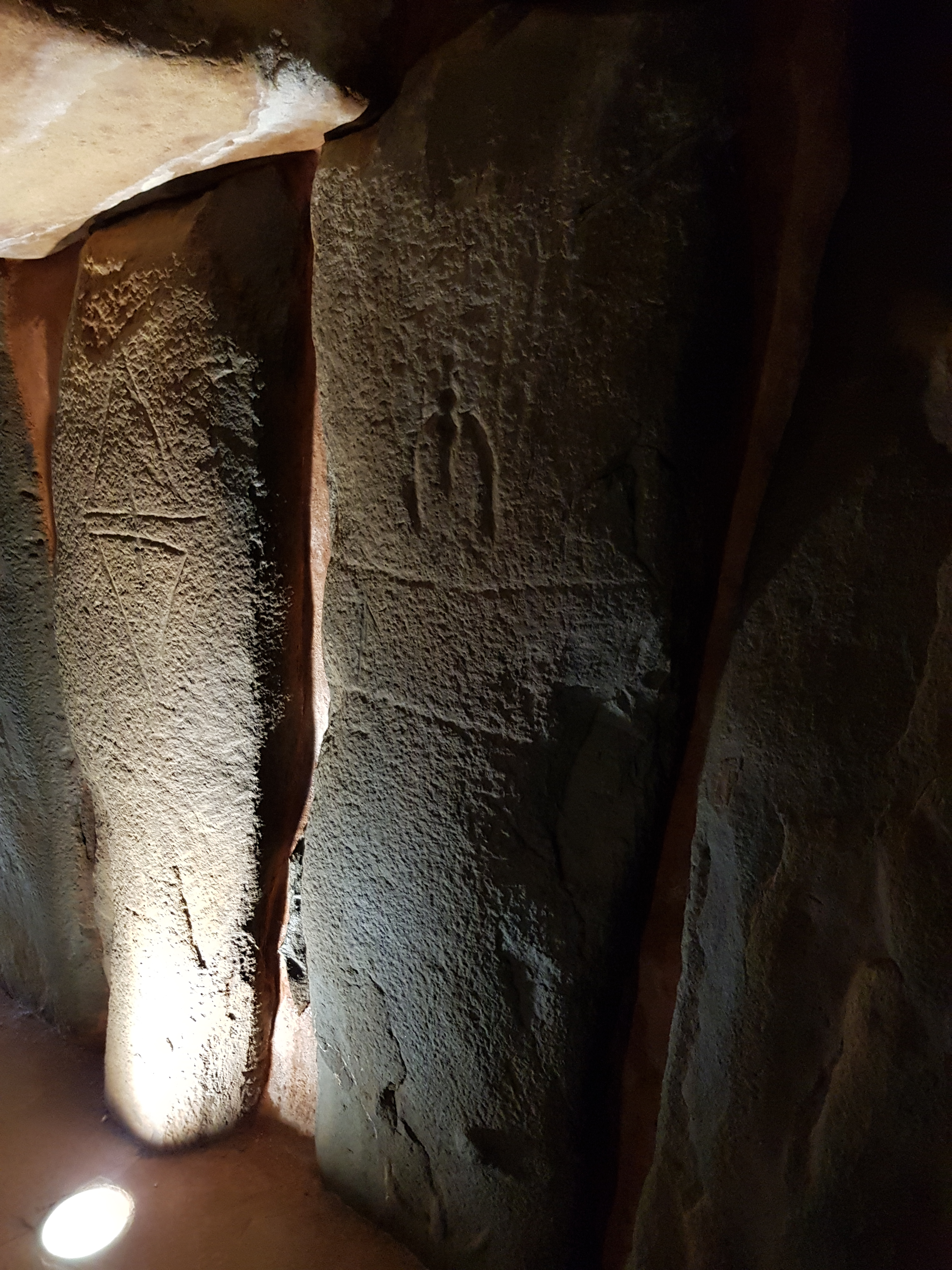
Engraved stones

Each of the eight buried bodies were in fetal position and had their belongings beside them. Daggers, cups, and marine fossils. The artifacts found were not as abundant as those found at other sites; therefore, it is assumed the Dolmen de Soto was used for a short period of time. Engravings were found on 43 standing stones and show humans, cups, knives, and geometric forms, simple lines or circles.

== See also ==
- Antequera Dolmens Site
- Dolmen of Menga
- Dolmen de Viera
