= Tomares =

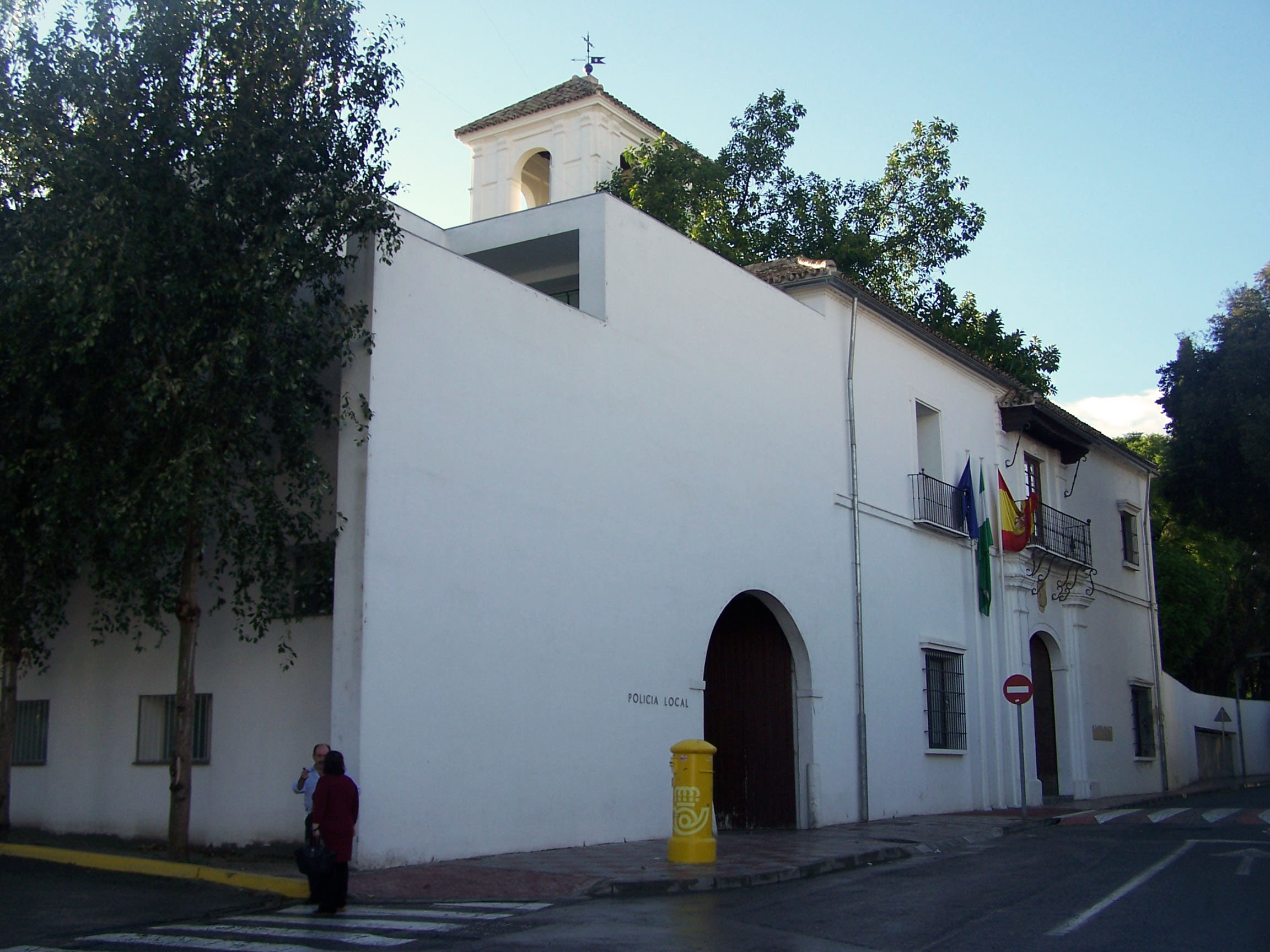
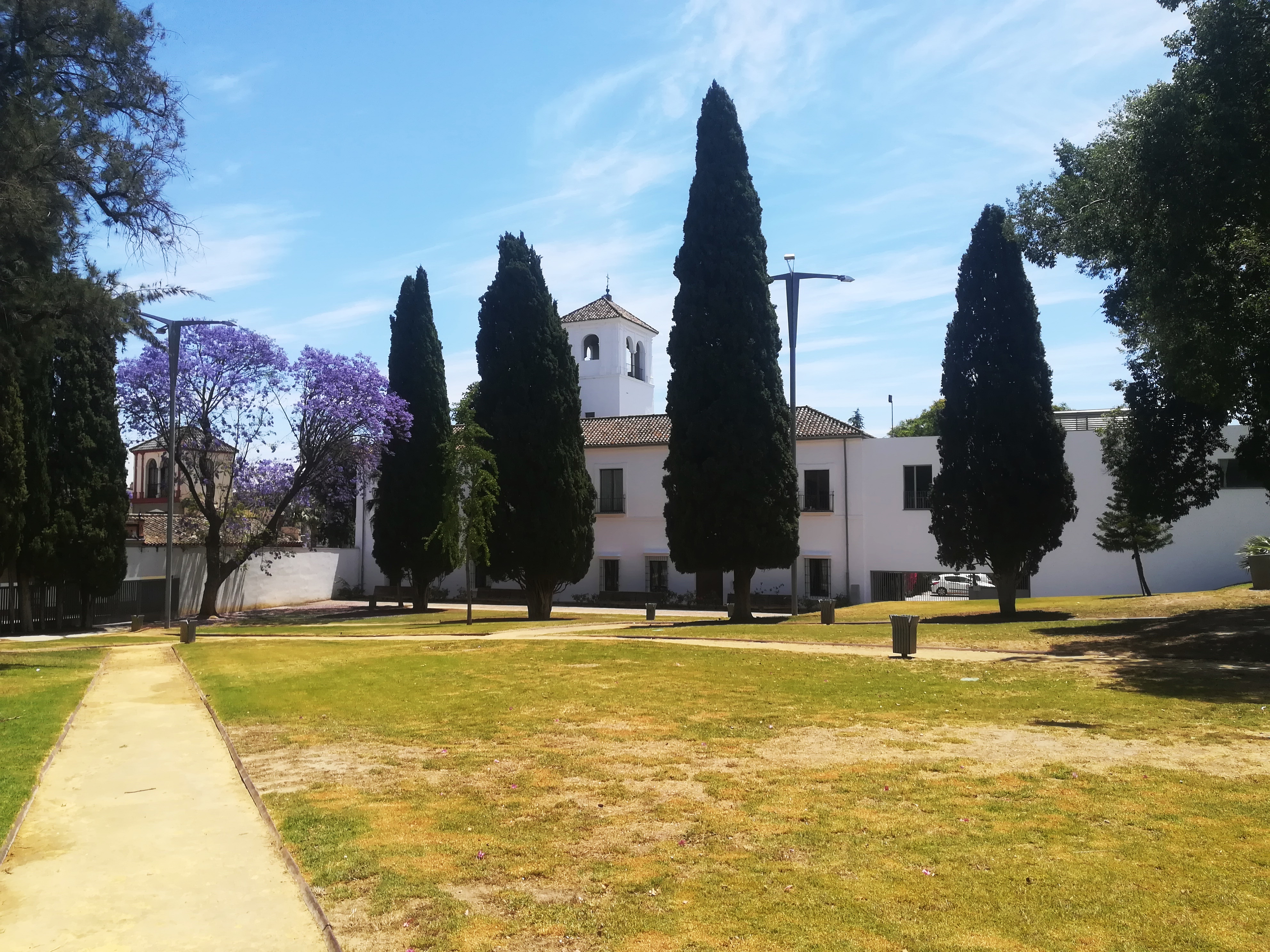
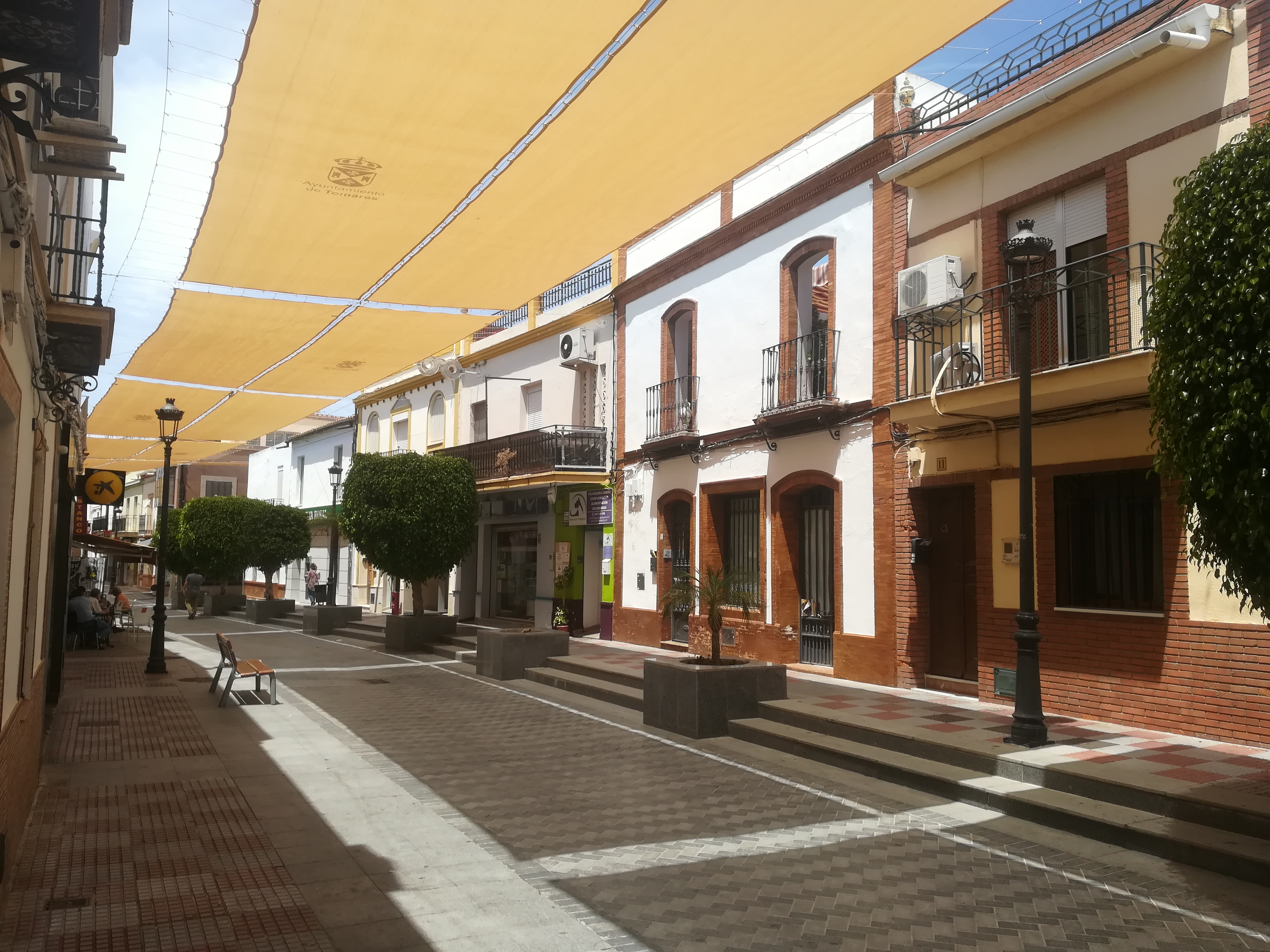

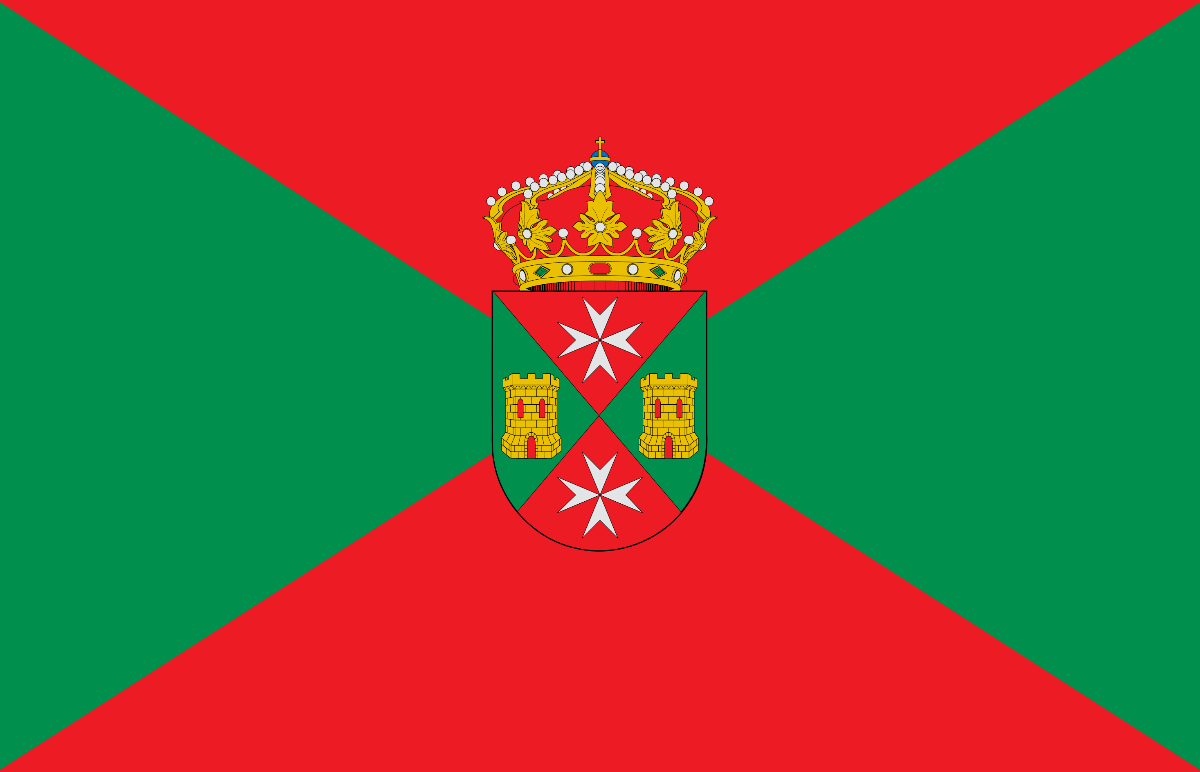
- Flag Coat of arms

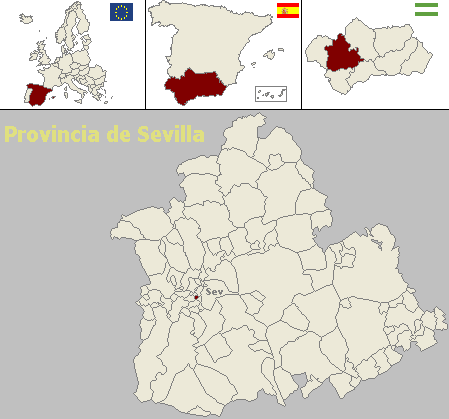
- Location of Tomares in the Province of Seville

- Location in Spain
- Coordinates: 37°22′35″N 6°2′45″W
- Country: Spain
- Autonomous community: Andalusia
- Province: Seville
- Comarca: Aljarafe

Government
  - Mayor: José Luis Sanz Ruiz

Area
  - Total: 5.17 km^{2} (2.00 sq mi)
- Elevation: 78 m (256 ft)

Population (2025-01-01)
  - Total: 25,432
  - Density: 4,920/km^{2} (12,700/sq mi)
- Demonym(s): Tomareño, -ña
- Time zone: UTC+1 (CET)
  - Summer (DST): UTC+2 (CEST)
- Postcode: 41940
- Website: www.tomares.es

Tomares is a municipality in Andalusia, southern Spain. It is a Seville suburb of over 25,000 inhabitants situated two kilometers west of Triana District of Seville, separated from the city by River Guadalquivir. It is surrounded by other municipalities of the Comarca of Aljarafe, whose boundaries are reduced to a single street, forming a conurbation.

== Roman hoard ==
In 2016 construction workers uncovered a 600 kg (1,300 lb) hoard of ancient Roman coins in Zaudin Park. The bronze coins were stored in 19 amphoras while newly minted, and are stamped with inscriptions of emperors Maximian and Constantine. Some were originally coated in silver.

== See also ==
- List of municipalities in Seville
