= Autovía A-52 =

Motorway in Spain

Autovía A-52
- Autovía da Rías Baixas
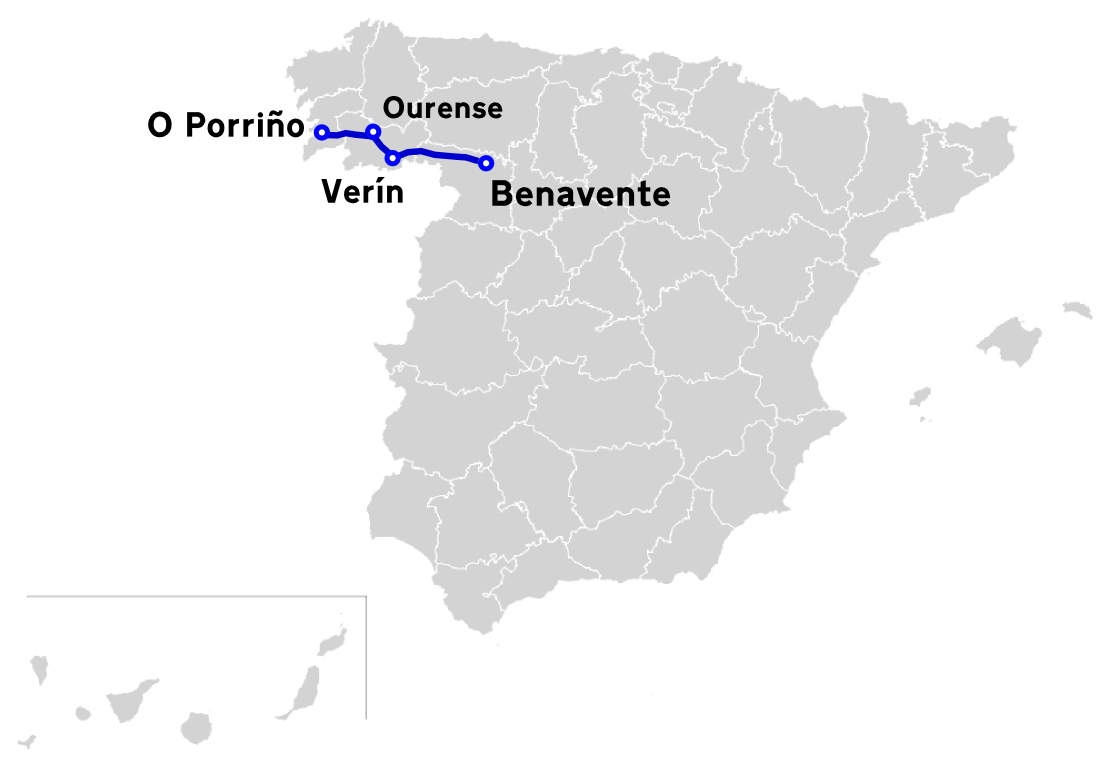

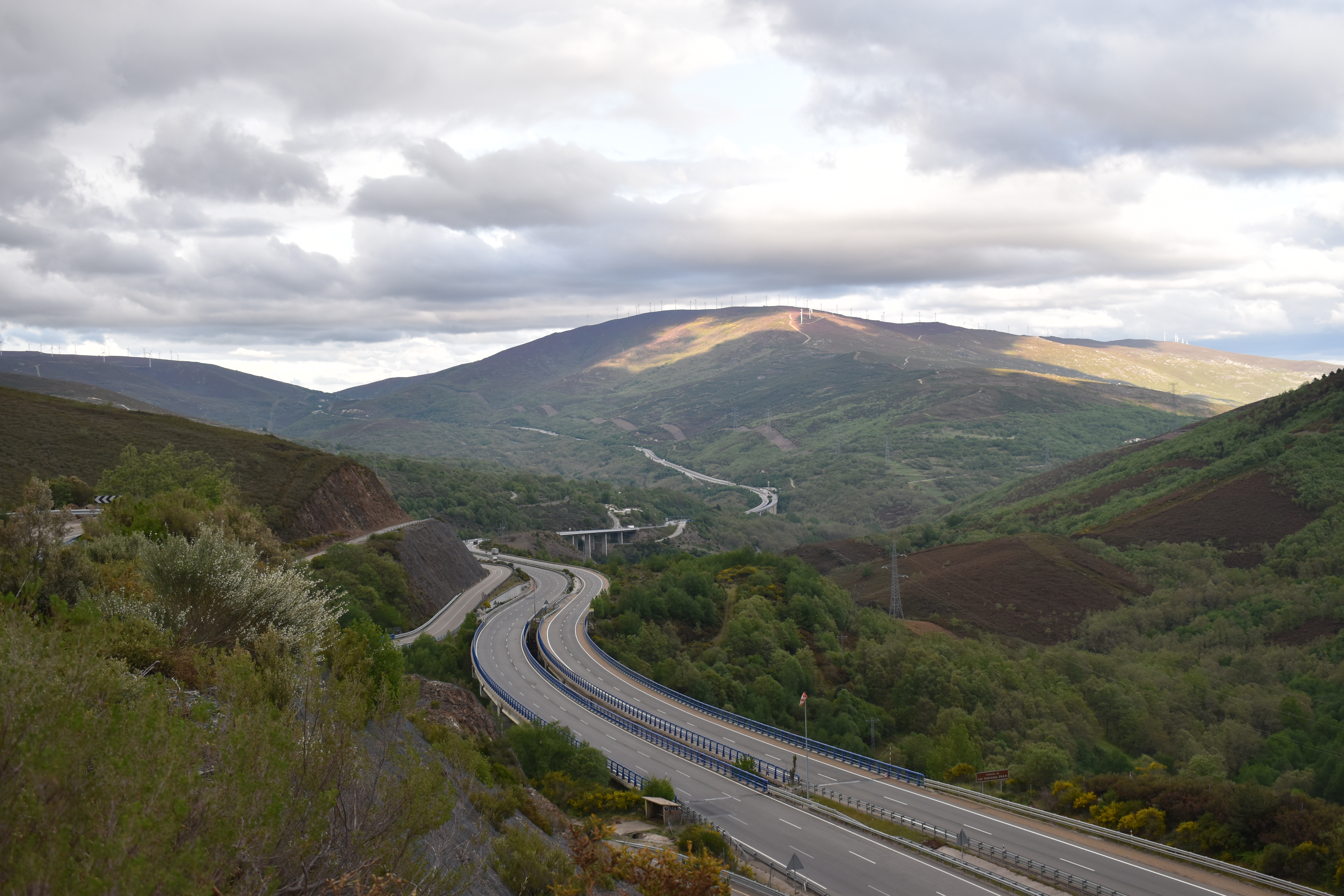

Route information
- Length: 278 km (173 mi)
- Existed: 1994–present

Major junctions
- East end: A-6 in Benavente
- N-631 in Rionegro del Puente; A-75 in Verín; N-532 in Verín; AG-31 in San Cibrao das Viñas; AG-53 in Toén; AG-51 in Salvaterra de Miño
- West end: A-55 in Mos

Location
- Country: Spain
- Autonomous communities: Galicia, Castile and Léon
- Provinces: Pontevedra, Ourense, Zamora

Highway system
- Highways in Spain; Autopistas and autovías; National Roads

The A-52 is a motorway in northwestern Spain. It starts at Vigo heads east from the town crossing the Autopista AP-9 and then the N-550/Autovía A-55. It then goes over the Rio Tea running parallel to the N-120 and along the Rio Miño. At Ourense the road turns south out of the valley in conjunction with the N-525. It passes over the Alto de Allariz (725m) and Alto de Estivadas (900m). At Verín the N-532 heads 13 km south to the Portugal frontier where it becomes the E-801/A-24/IP-3.

The road runs to the north of the Sierra de Peñas Libras and over the Alto de Fumaces (850m). The Peña Nofre (1,291m) lies to the north. The road heads east over the Alto do Canizo (1,035m) into the Valle de Sanabria overlooked by the Sierra la Cabrera rising to 2,044m at Mt Moncalvo.

The road then heads along the Rio Tera which is dammed into a series of reservoirs. At Benavente the Rios Esla and Orbigo converge. There is a junction with the Autovía A-6 and Autovía A-66 as well as the N-VI.

The section of the A-52 that runs through the northwest of the province of Zamora, as it passes through the regions of La Carballeda and Sanabria, has been identified by various environmental groups as the black point of Spanish roads for the wolf, a species that in Spain enjoys protection status. There are several reasons for this problem, most of them related to the lack of maintenance of the highway as it passes through said territory.

On July 3, 2025, Portuguese footballer Diogo Jota and his brother, André Silva both died in a car crash while driving on this road, this crash raised concerns about how unsafe the road was.
