= Autovía A-55 =

Motorway in Spain

Autovía A-55
- Autovía del Atlántico

Route information
- Length: 32 km (20 mi)

Major junctions
- From: Vigo
- To: Portugal–Spain border at Tui

Location
- Country: Spain

Highway system
- Highways in Spain; Autopistas and autovías; National Roads

The Autovía A-55 (also known as Autovía del Atlántico) is an autovía in Galicia (Spain). It is 32 km (20 miles) long and runs from the centre of Vigo to the Portugal–Spain border, on the Minho River at Tui, where it connects to the A3 motorway (Portugal).

The A-55 runs parallel to the Autopista AP-9 for much of its length, and also connects with the Autovía A-52 at the town of O Porriño. Between Vigo and O Porriño, the autovía is an upgrade of the N-120 road, and between O Porriño and the Portuguese border it is an upgrade of the N-550. For the final 5 km (3 miles) of its length, from the end of the AP-9 north of Tui to the Portuguese border and the A3 autoestrada, the A-55 forms part of European route E01.

== Sections ==
Denomination	Section	Kilometres	Service year
A-55	Vigo - Puxeiros	11	1992
A-55	Variant of Puxeiros	2	1992
A-55	Porriño - Tuy	13	1993
A-55	Variant of Tuy and Access to the International Bridge	4,5	1992
A-55	Tuy International Bridge (Miño River) - Portuguese border	1	1993
