= Chucena =

Municipality in Spain

Coordinates: 37°22′N 6°23′W

- Municipality
- Concello de Chucena
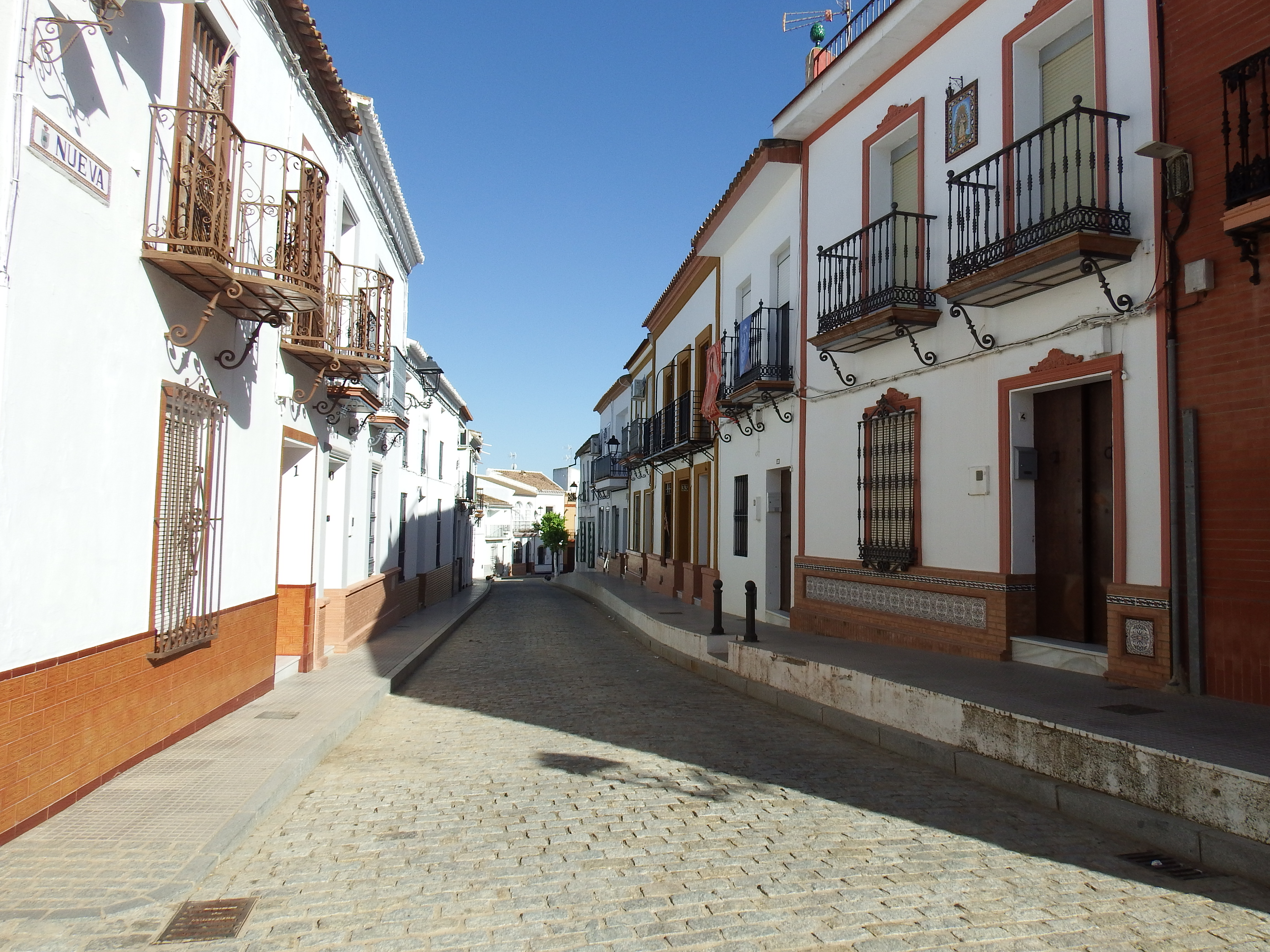
- Calle Nueva (New Street)

- Flag Seal

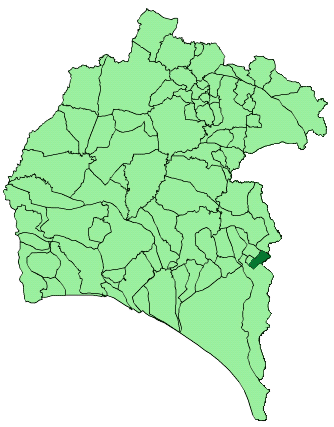
- Map of Chucena, Huelva
- Country: Spain
- Autonomous community: Andalusia
- Province: Huelva

Area
  - Total: 26 km^{2} (10 sq mi)
- Elevation: 147 m (482 ft)

Population (2005)
  - Total: 2,044
  - Density: 79/km^{2} (200/sq mi)
- Time zone: UTC+1 (CET)
  - Summer (DST): UTC+2 (CEST)

Chucena is a town and municipality located in the province of Huelva, Spain. In the 2005 census, it had a population of 2044 inhabitants and covered a 26 km^{2} area (78.6 people per km^{2}).

== Geography ==
The municipality covers an area of 26 km^{2}. It is at an altitude of 147 m above sea level, and 62 km from the capital.

== Demography ==
In the 2005 census, it had a population of 2044 inhabitants. It had a population density of 78.6 per km^{2}.

== See also ==
- List of municipalities in Huelva
