= Caldas de Reis =

- Municipality
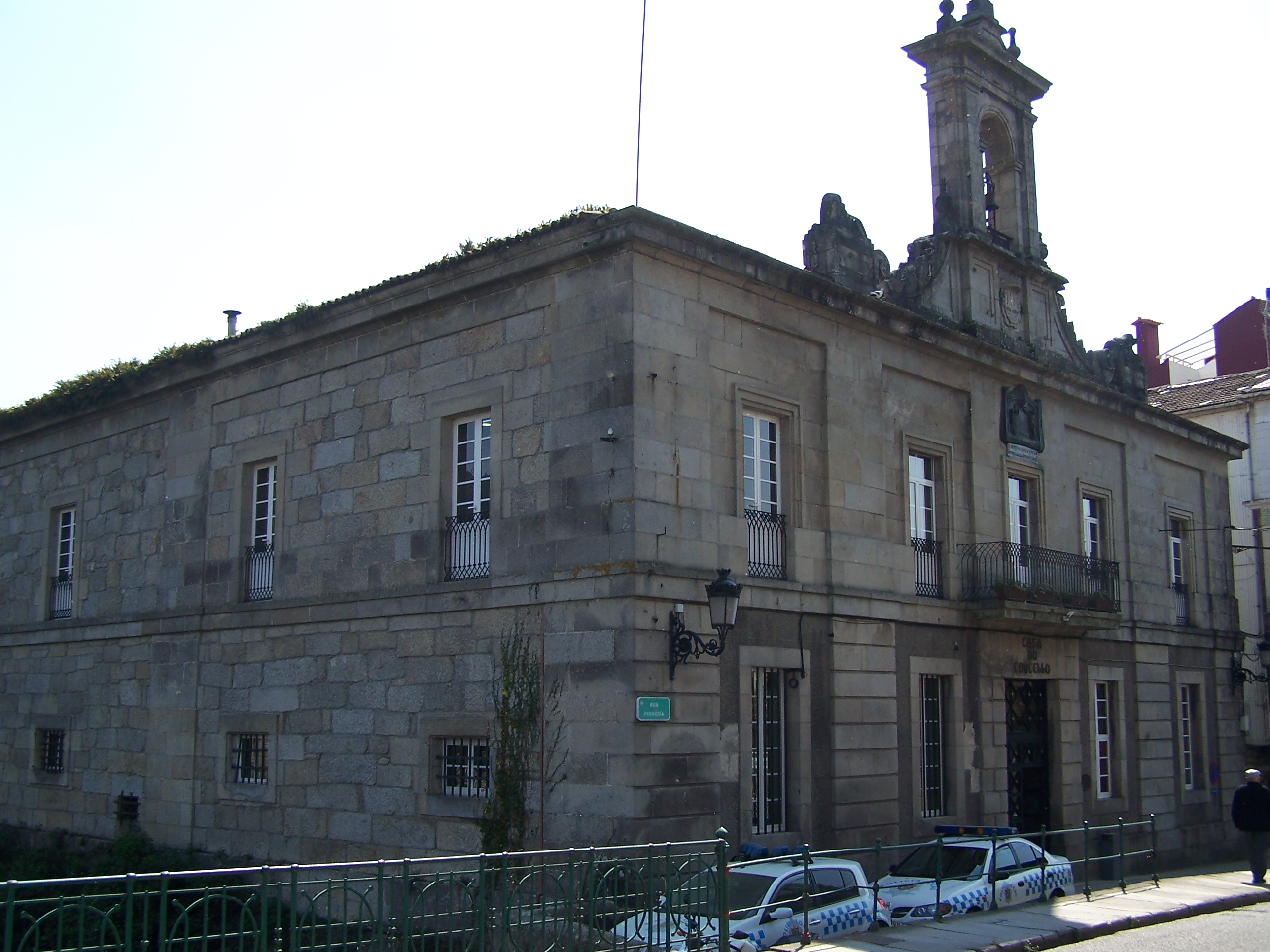
- Town hall.

- Coat of arms

- Location in Spain
- Coordinates: 42°36′10″N 8°38′18″W
- Country: Spain
- Autonomous community: Galicia
- Province: Pontevedra
- Comarca: Caldas

Government
  - Mayor: Juan Manuel Rey

Area
  - Total: 68.16 km^{2} (26.32 sq mi)

Population (2025-01-01)
  - Total: 9,615
  - Density: 141.1/km^{2} (365.4/sq mi)
- Time zone: UTC+1 (CET)
  - Summer (DST): UTC+2 (CET)
- Website: http://www.caldasdereis.com/

Caldas de Reis is a municipality in the north of the province of Pontevedra, in the autonomous community of Galicia, Spain. It belongs to the comarca of Caldas.

== History ==
In Ptolemy's Tables, the town Caldas de Reis (in Galician language) appears as Aquae calidae (Ancient Greek: Ὕδατα Θερμά, meaning hot springs) and in the Itinerarium Antonini as Aquae Celenae. Lucas de Tuy calls it Caldas de Rege. F. Pérez calls it Cilenos or Celenae.

A bishop of this see named Ortigius was at the first Council of Toledo at the end of the 4th century. Of two bishops consecrated later, named respectively Pastor and Siagrius, one appears to have been for this diocese.

In the mid-6th century, the bishop's seat was transferred to Iria Flavia, now the Archdiocese of Santiago de Compostela. Thus, no longer a residential bishopric, Caldas de Reis is today listed by the Catholic Church as a titular see.

The town is the second to last stop on the Portuguese Way path of the Camino de Santiago before it reaches Santiago de Compostela.

== Hot springs ==
Caldas de Reis is known for its hot springs such as those at Acuña Thermal Spa and Dávila Thermal Spa. The mineral content at Acuña is high in bicarbonate, fluoride, lithium, nitrogen, silica, sodium, sulphur, and radioactive elements. The hot water emerges from the thermal springs at 42 °C. The mineral content from Dávila is high in chloride, nitrogen, sodium-rich, sulphur-rich, and radioactive elements. The hot water emerges from the source at 48 °C.

== See also ==
- List of municipalities in Pontevedra
