= Pontecesures =

- municipality
- Coat of arms

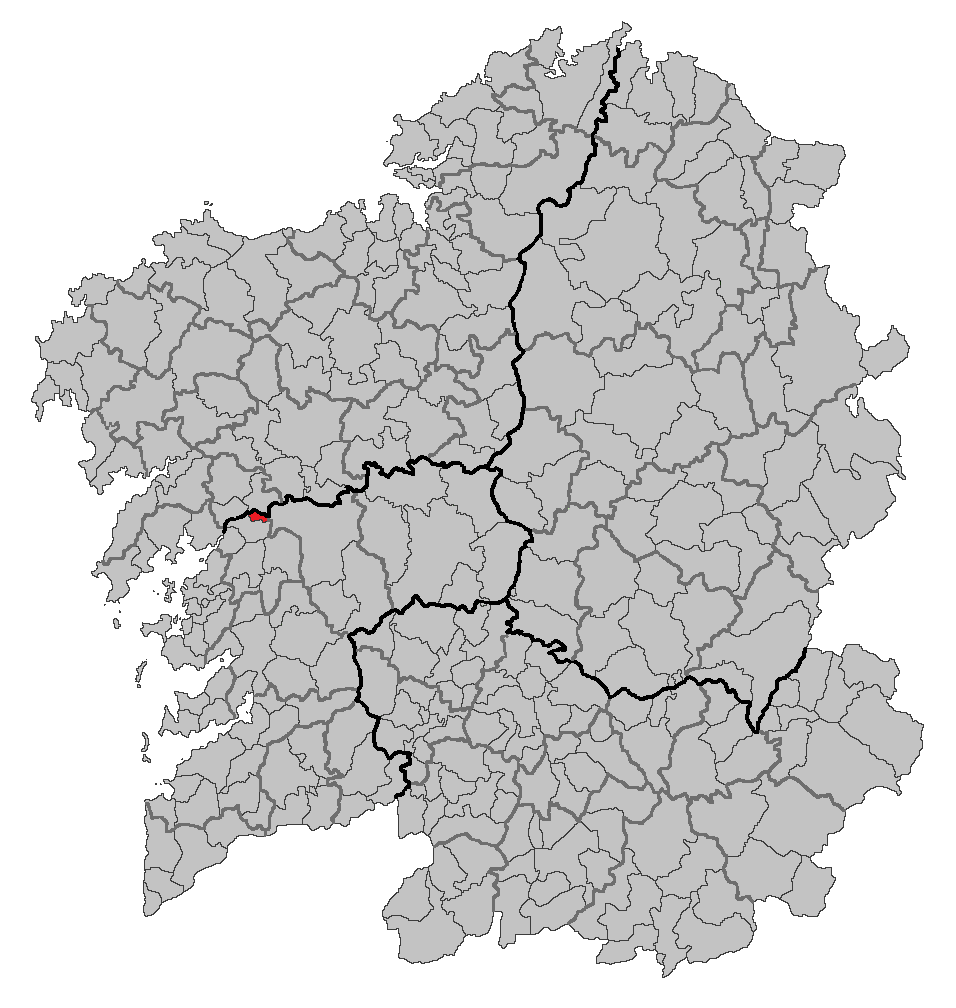
- Situation of Pontecesures within Galicia
- Coordinates: 42°43′00″N 8°39′00″W
- Parroquias: San Xulian

Government
  - Alcalde (Mayor): Manuel Luís Álvarez Angueira (BNG)

Area
  - Land: 6.7 km^{2} (2.6 sq mi)

Population (2025-01-01)
  - Total: 3,076
- Time zone: UTC+1 (CET)
  - Summer (DST): UTC+2 (CET)

Pontecesures is a municipality in the province of Pontevedra, in the autonomous community of Galicia, Spain. It belongs to the comarca of Caldas.

== See also ==
- List of municipalities in Pontevedra
