= Trigueros, Spain =

Coordinates: 37°23′N 6°50′W

Trigueros
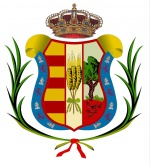
- Flag Coat of arms

- Location in Spain
- Country: Spain
- Autonomous community: Andalusia
- Province: Huelva

Area
  - Total: 118.3 km^{2} (45.7 sq mi)
- Elevation: 76 m (249 ft)

Population (2025-01-01)
  - Total: 8,159
  - Density: 68.97/km^{2} (178.6/sq mi)
- Time zone: UTC+1 (CET)
  - Summer (DST): UTC+2 (CEST)

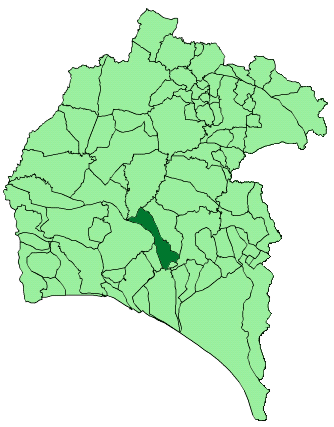
Map of Trigueros, Huelva

Trigueros is a town and municipality located in the province of Huelva, Spain. According to the 2008 census, the municipality had a population of 7,477.

== Main Sights ==
- Dolmen de Soto, dated 3000-2500 BC. It is one of the most famous megalithic monument in Andalusia

== See also ==
- List of municipalities in Huelva
