= Aljarafe =

Region in Spain

Asharaf or Axarafe is the olive-cultivating hilly region around the Guadiamar river located between Seville and Niebla in Andalusia.

== Olive production ==
Olive oil was a significant commodity in 16th century Seville, exported to "all the Kingdom, to the Indies, and to so many other parts of the world." Asharaf was one of its richest olive growing regions. There is evidence of speculators buying large quantities of "the oil of Axarafe", and "the wine and oil of Axarafe" are listed among the goods purchased by monopolists to export to the Indies.

== 19th century literature ==
In a translation of Ahmed Mohammed al-Maqqari by 19th century scholar Pascual de Gayangos y Arce, the author claims "much has been said of the land of Asharaf by various authors". The following description of the land of Asharaf is given by the author:

"It surpasses in beauty and fertility every other spot on the face on the earth; that the oil of its olives is exported as far as Alexandria; that its hamlets and villages are much superior to those of other countries in the extent and commodiousness, and the fine design and ornament, of their houses, which from the continual white-washing, look like so many stars in a sky of olive trees."

From a poem addressed to the Sultan Al-Mu'tamid ibn Abbad:

"Seville is a young bride; her husband is 'Abbád;
Her diadem is Asharaf; her necklace the river."

A similar poem appears in David Urquhart's 19th century travel literature The Pillars of Hercules:

"Seville is a young bride, her husband is 'Abbab;
Her diadem is Asharaf; her necklace Guadakquivir
Asharaf is a forest without wild beasts,
Guadalquivir, a river without crocodiles."

== See also ==
- Kingdom of Seville
