= Umbrete =

Umbrete, Spain
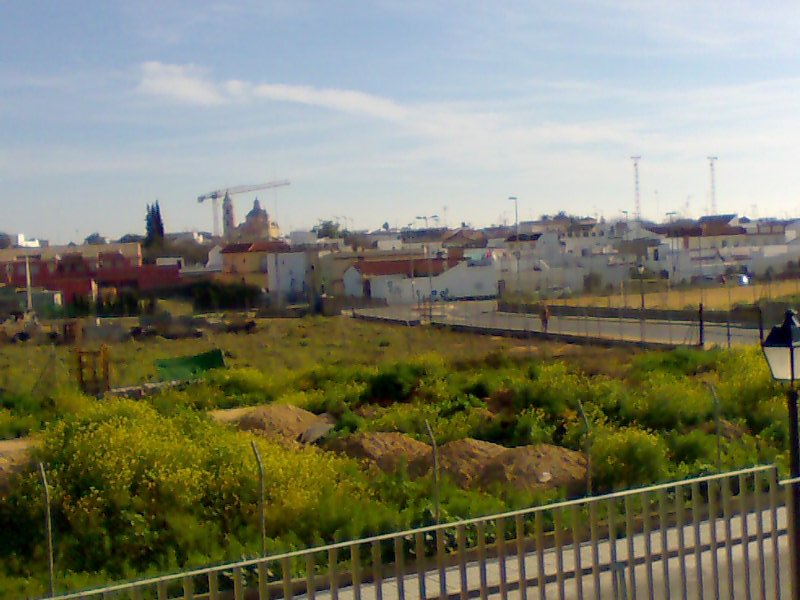

- Flag Coat of arms
- Interactive map of Umbrete, Spain
- Coordinates: 37°22′N 6°09′W
- Country: Spain
- Province: Seville
- Municipality: Umbrete

Area
  - Total: 12 km^{2} (4.6 sq mi)
- Elevation: 121 m (397 ft)

Population (2025-01-01)
  - Total: 9,455
  - Density: 790/km^{2} (2,000/sq mi)
- Time zone: UTC+1 (CET)
  - Summer (DST): UTC+2 (CEST)

Umbrete is a city located in the province of Seville, Spain. According to the 2005 census (INE), the city has a population of 5,797 inhabitants.

== See also ==
- List of municipalities in Seville
