= Valga, Pontevedra =

Valga
- Municipality
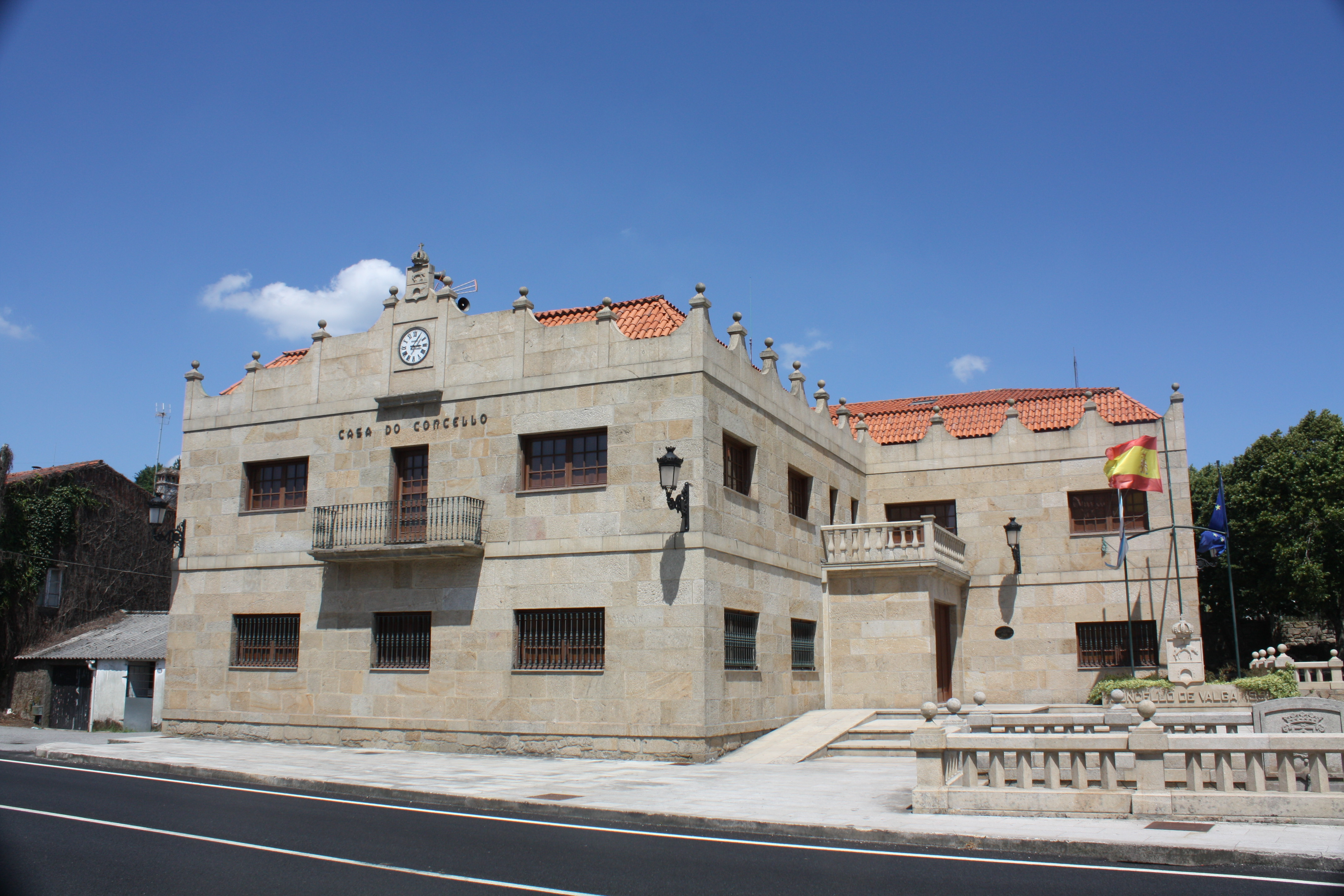
- Municipal office

- Flag Coat of arms

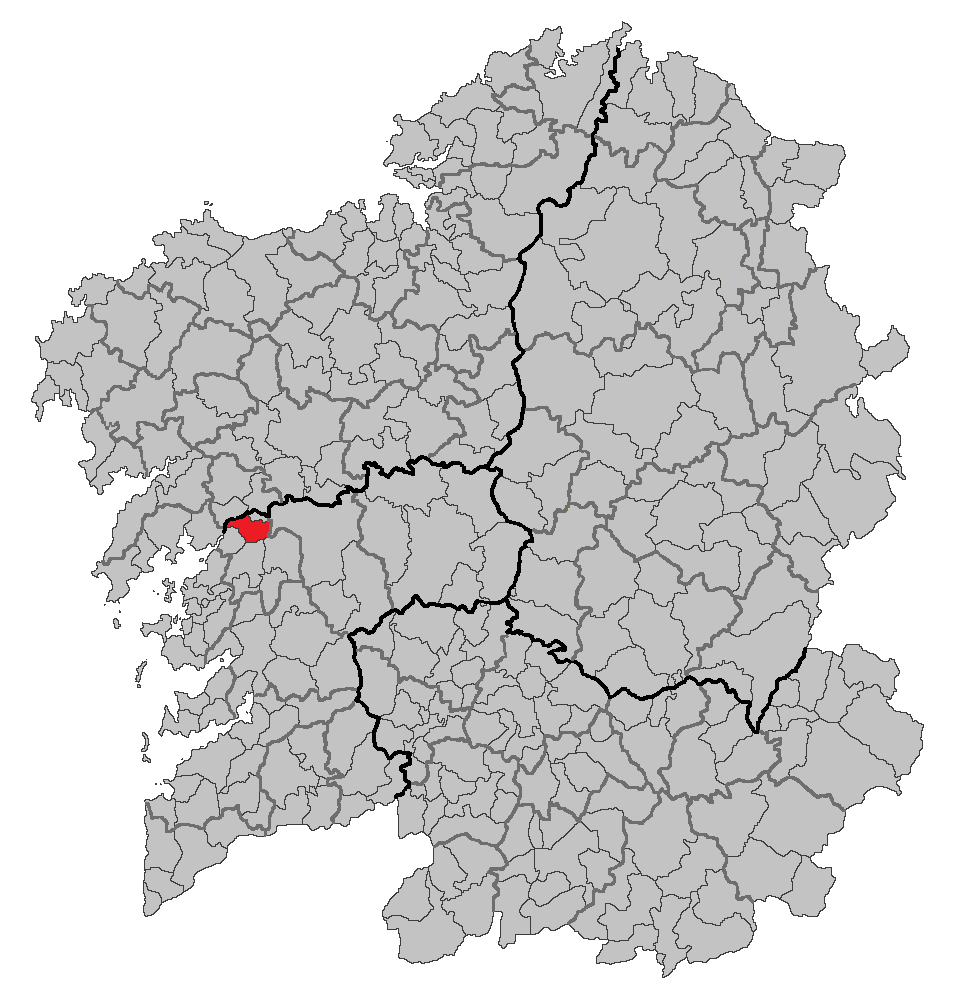
- Location of Valga within Galicia

- Location within Spain Location within Galicia
- Coordinates: 42.700°N 8.633°W
- Country: Spain
- Autonomous community: Galicia
- Province: Pontevedra
- Comarca: Caldas

Area
  - Total: 40.72 km^{2} (15.72 sq mi)

Population (2025-01-01)
  - Total: 5,779
  - Density: 141.9/km^{2} (367.6/sq mi)
- Time zone: UTC+1 (CET)
  - Summer (DST): UTC+2 (CET)

Valga is a municipality in the province of Pontevedra, in the autonomous community of Galicia, Spain. It belongs to the comarca of Caldas.

The town's twin towns are Valga in Estonia and Valka in Latvia.

== See also ==
- List of municipalities in Pontevedra
