= Espartinas =

Espartinas, Spain
- City
- Flag Coat of arms
- Interactive map of Espartinas, Spain
- Coordinates: 37°23′N 6°07′W
- Country: Spain
- Province: Seville
- Municipality: Espartinas

Area
  - Total: 23 km^{2} (8.9 sq mi)
- Elevation: 132 m (433 ft)

Population (2025-01-01)
  - Total: 16,479
  - Density: 720/km^{2} (1,900/sq mi)
- Time zone: UTC+1 (CET)
  - Summer (DST): UTC+2 (CEST)

Espartinas is a city located in the province of Seville, Spain. According to the 2019 census (INE), the city has a population of 15,791 inhabitants.

It has been twinned with Clackmannanshire, Scotland since 2006.

== History ==
The origin of Espartinas can be traced back to the Roman era and the establishment of the settlements of Lauretum, Tablante, Paterna, Villalvilla, and Mejina. The name Espartinas appears in the 13th century, when king Ferdinand III of Castile conquered vast areas of the Guadalquivir basin during the Reconquista. King Alfonso X of Castile later gave the town its current coat of arms.

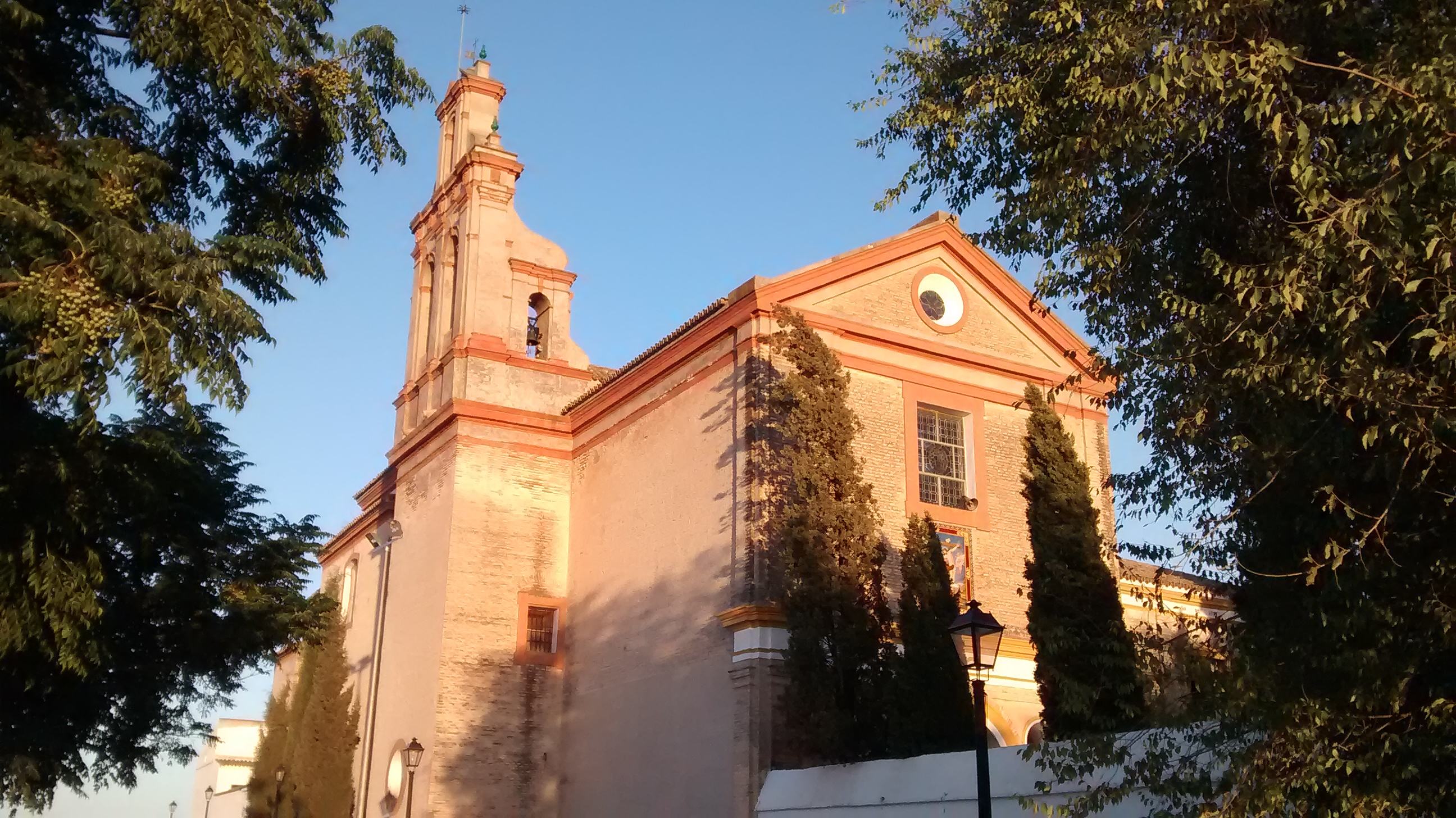
Frontal view of the Monastery of Our Lady of Loreto, Espartinas, Seville

== See also ==
- List of municipalities in Seville
