= Autopista AP-9 =

Road in Spain

Autopista AP-9
- Autoestrada do Atlántico
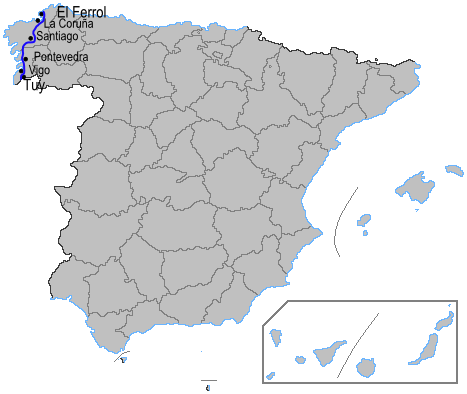

Route information
- Part of E1 and E70
- Maintained by Audasa
- Length: 219.6 km (136.5 mi)
- Existed: 1973–present
- History: Opened: 1973; Completed: 1992

Major junctions
- From: Ferrol
- To: Tui

Location
- Country: Spain
- Provinces: A Coruña, Pontevedra
- Major cities: Ferrol, A Coruña, Santiago de Compostela, Pontevedra, Vigo

Highway system
- Highways in Spain; Autopistas and autovías; National Roads
← A-8	→ A-10

The AP-9 or Autoestrada do Atlántico is a toll motorway in Galicia, Spain. It starts in A Coruña and runs south past the cities of Santiago de Compostela, Pontevedra and Vigo, before ending at the town of Tui, a few kilometres north of the Portuguese border at the Minho River.

The AP-9 is 178 km (111 miles) in length. The first 16 km (10 miles), from A Coruña to the A-6 autovía near the towns of Guísamo and Betanzos, form part of European route E70, while the remainder forms part of European route E01. Between A Coruña and Vigo, the motorway runs parallel to the N-550 road, and between Vigo and Tui it runs parallel to the A-55 autovía .

The AP-9 has two spurs: the 36 km (22.5 mile) long AP-9F from Guísamo to Ferrol, which runs parallel to the N-651 road and also forms part of European route E01; and the 4 km (2.5 mile) long AP-9V, which runs into the centre of Vigo.

== History ==
Construction of the motorway, originally known as the A-9, began in the mid-1970s with the section between Pontevedra and Vigo, including the Rande Bridge, and also the section between A Coruña and Santiago de Compostela. The latter opened in 1979, the former two years later.

Between 1988 and 1992, these two sections were gradually linked. In 1994, construction of the spur to Ferrol commenced.

In the late 1990s, the A-9 was extended from Vigo to what is now the junction with the Autoestrada AG-57. Then, in the early 2000s, it was extended from this point to Tui. The spur to Ferrol was completed in 2003, and in the same year the A-9 was redesignated the AP-9, as part of the general redesignation of Spanish autopistas and autovías.

== Gallery ==
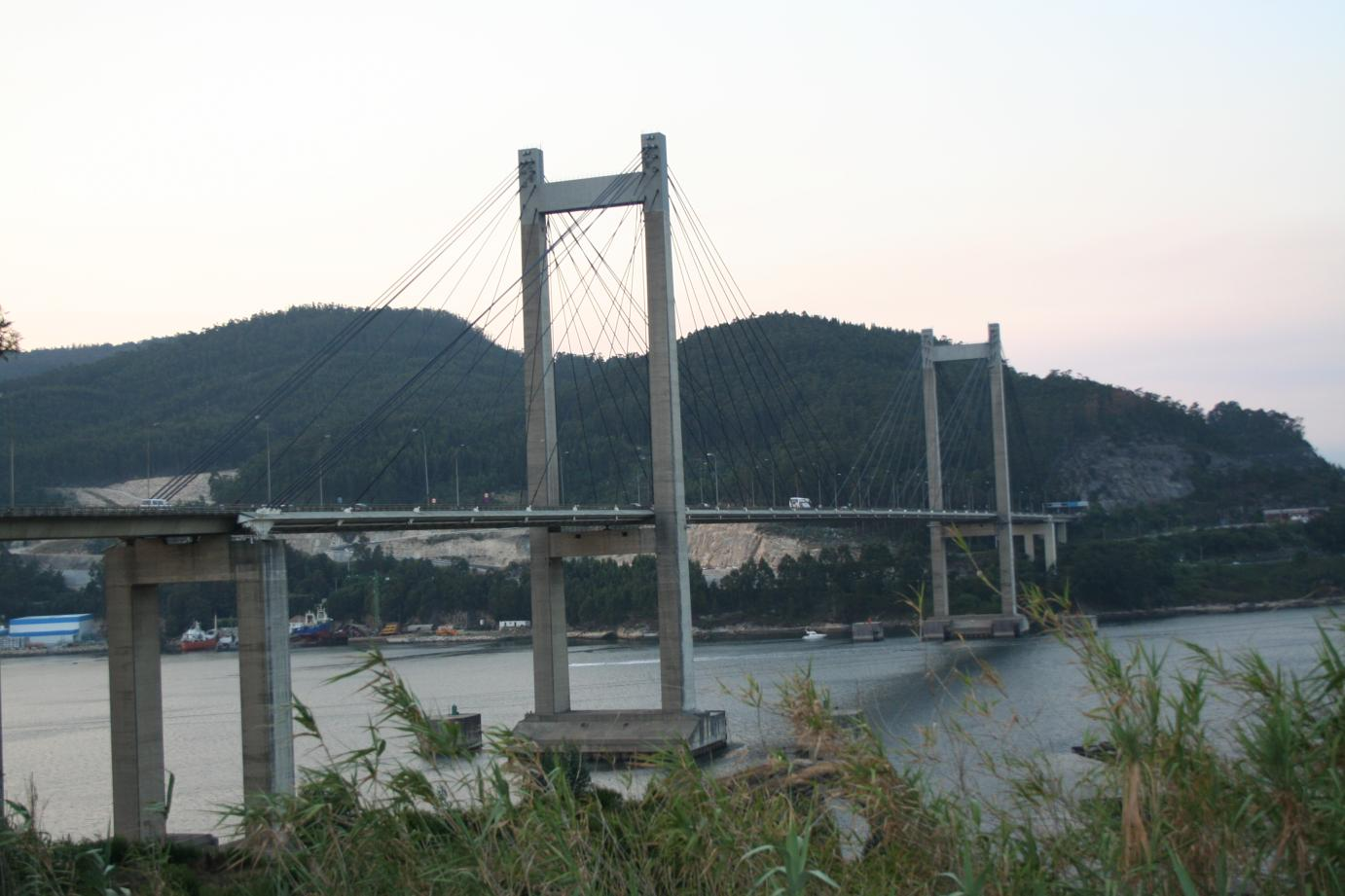
Rande Bridge, Vigo

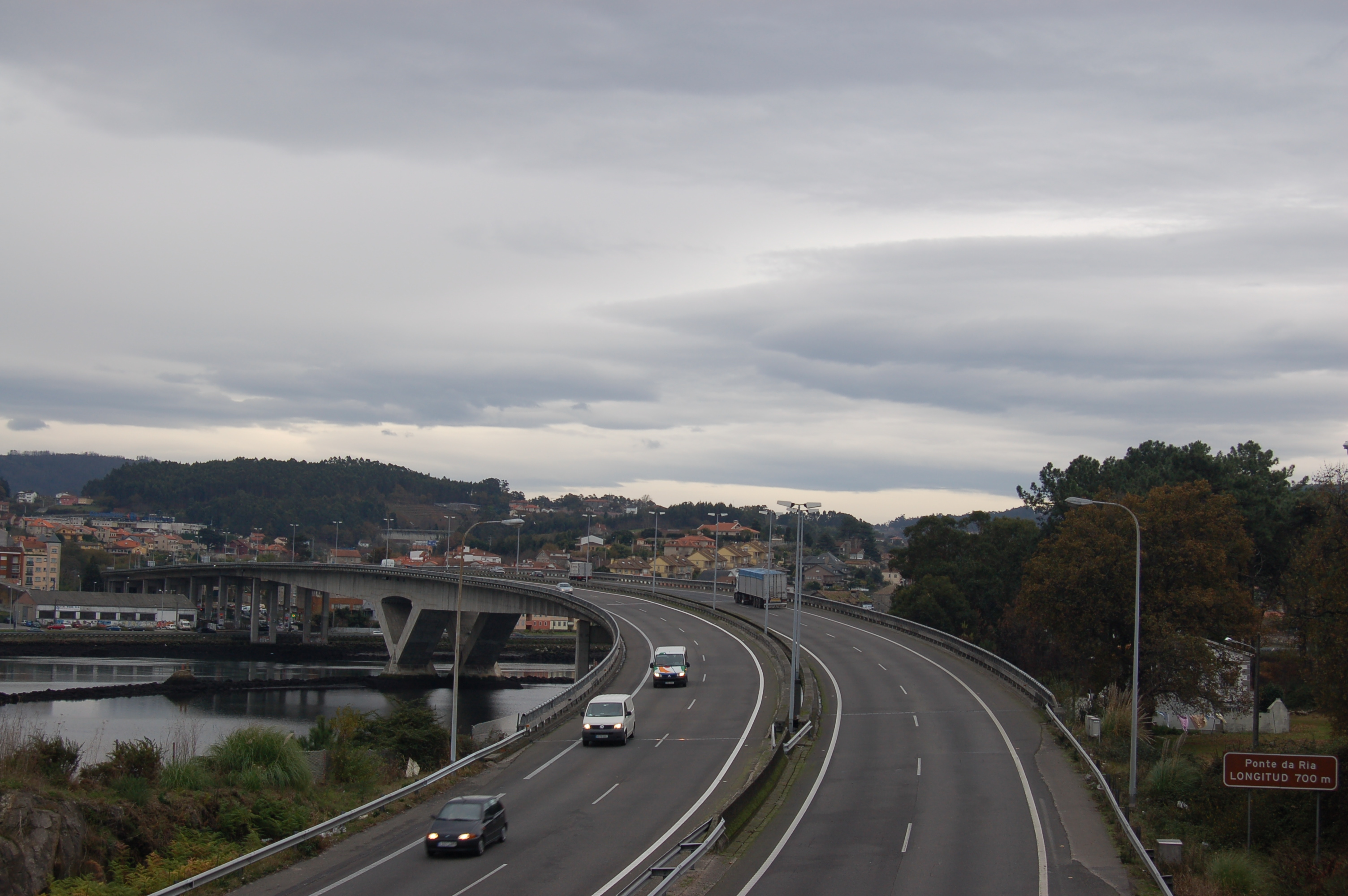
Ponte da Ría, Pontevedra
