= Autovía A-6 =

Road in Spain

Autovía A-6
- Autovía/Autopista del Noroeste
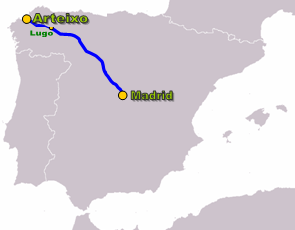

Route information
- Length: 590 km (370 mi)

Major junctions
- From: Madrid
- To: Arteixo

Location
- Country: Spain

Highway system
- Highways in Spain; Autopistas and autovías; National Roads

The Autovía A-6 or Autopista AP-6 (also called Autovía del Noroeste) (Galician: Autovía do Noroeste) is a Spanish autovía and autopista route that starts in Madrid and ends in Arteixo (A Coruña).

The tolled Autopista AP-6, from Villalba to Adanero, has a total length of 72.19 km. It includes one of the most important engineering works in the whole motorway, a tri-tube tunnel under the Sierra de Guadarrama.

== Sections ==
#	From	To	Length	Signal
1	Madrid	Collado Villalba	41.79 km	A-6
2	Collado Villalba	Adanero	72.19 km	AP-6
3	Adanero	Medina del Campo	51.29 km	A-6
4	Medina del Campo	Benavente	107.65 km	A-6
5	Benavente	Astorga	65.57 km	A-6
6	Astorga	Ponferrada	65.05 km	A-6
7	Ponferrada	Baamonde	140.26 km	A-6
8	Baamonde	Arteixo	74.33 km	A-6

== Major cities crossed ==
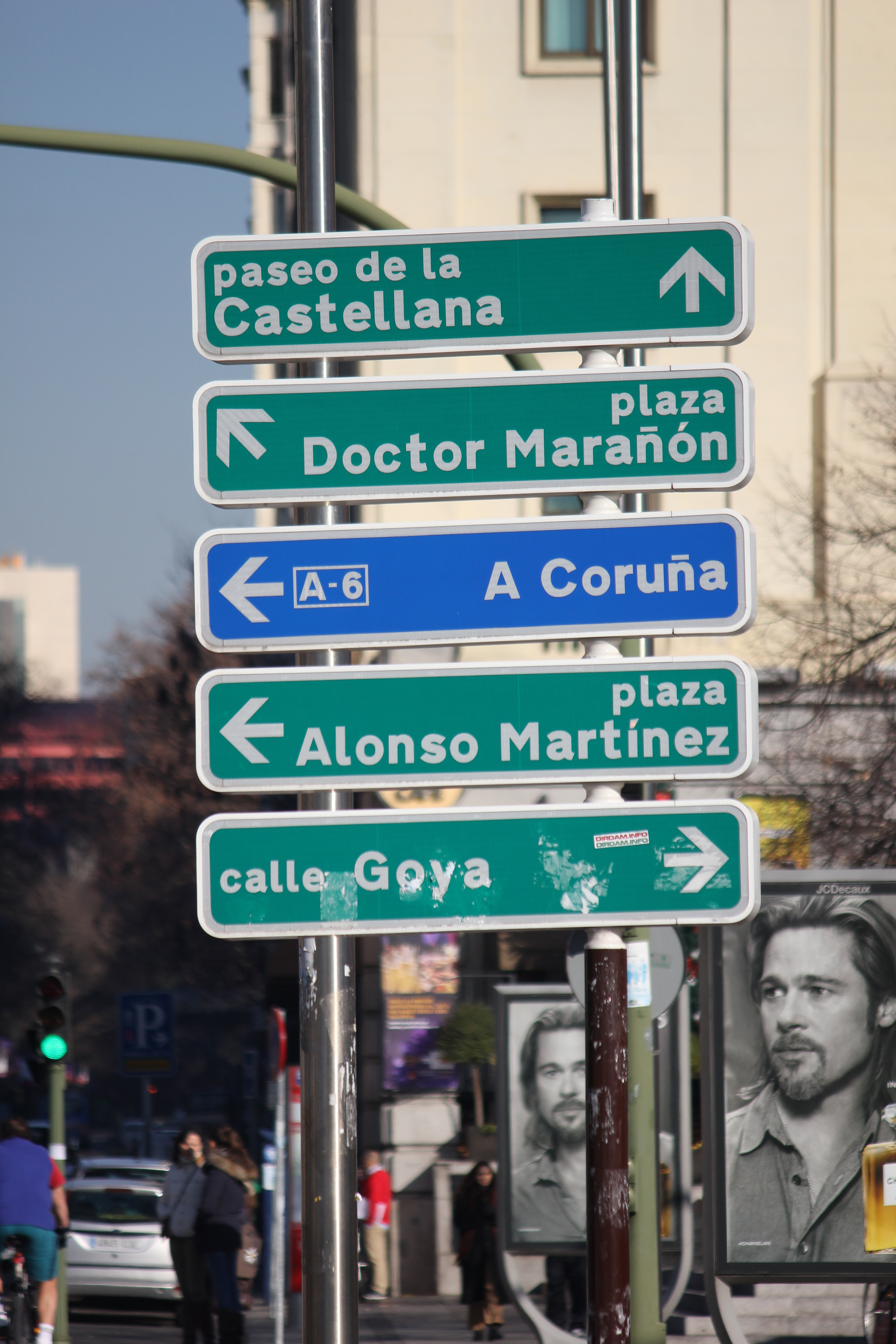
Sign for Autovía A-6 in central Madrid

- Madrid
- Collado Villalba
- Medina del Campo
- Tordesillas
- Benavente
- Astorga
- Ponferrada
- Lugo
- Betanzos
- A Coruña
- Arteixo
