= Al-Azraq Treaty of 1245 =

1245 treaty between James I of Aragon and Al-Azraq

The Al-Azraq Treaty of 1245 was a surrender treaty between the Christian King James I of Aragón, his son-in-law Prince Alfonso X of Castile, and the Mudéjar commander Abū 'Abd Allāh Muhammad ibn Hudhayl, more commonly known as al-Azraq. It was signed on 15 April 1245 in Vall d'Alcalà, his hometown within al-Andalus, in what is now modern day Spain, the Iberian Peninsula. The treaty is one of only two bilingual Muslim-Christian surrender treaties to survive into the present day. According to James I, the treaty marked the end of the reconquista.

== Context ==
=== Muslims and al-Andalus ===
==== Umayyad Caliphate ====
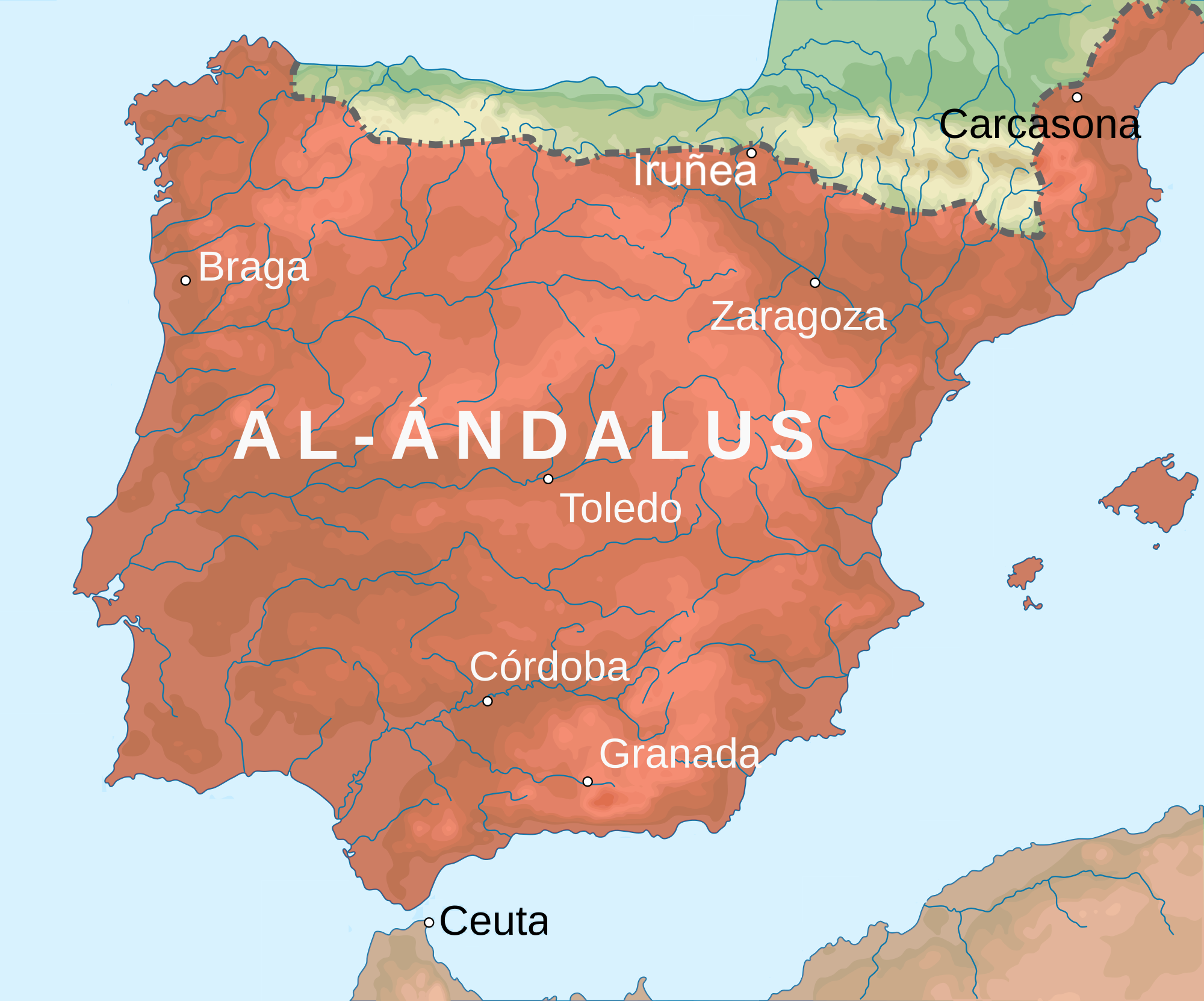
Map of al-Andalus 756 C.E.

Muslim and Arab forces from Northwest Africa, under the military leadership of Ṭāriq ibn Ziyād, conquered al-Andalus between 711 and 718 C.E. At the time, the region was under the control of the Visigoths but, after the Battle of Guadalete, the area fell to the Umayyad Caliphate. The Caliphate collapsed in the East in 750 CE, but continued on al-Andalus until 1031 when it broke up into 23 small emirates known as the tafia kingdoms. These became the main rivals of the Christian territories on the Peninsula. The Umayyads were then subsequently replaced by the Abbasid Dynasty in the East. Many Christians fled to the Northern parts of the peninsula and established the kingdom of Asturias, which eventually split into the kingdoms of Castile, Galicia, and León. The Asturians conquered the Umayyads at the Battle of Covadonga in 722; this is when many historians determine that the Reconquista began. After this event, the Umayyads faced the loss of Galicia (739), León (754), Barcelona (801), and Salamanca (939). According to the historian Alan Heston, the Caliph of Córdoba, al-Mansur, "undertook more than fifty jihads into Christian areas of northern Spain to pillage and eventually expand Muslim rule to all of present-day Spain." In 997, al-Mansur called for the destruction of the Church of St. James in León. This site served as an important pilgrimage destination for Christians since it claimed to hold the tomb of James, the brother of Jesus. The tomb was left alone, but the church itself was dismembered, with the doors and bells taken to Córdoba to expand its mosque. The year 1000 saw the weakening of Islamic hold on the peninsula since al-Mansur left Córdoba in a weaker condition than he received it and the Umayyad caliphate finally broke apart in 1031.

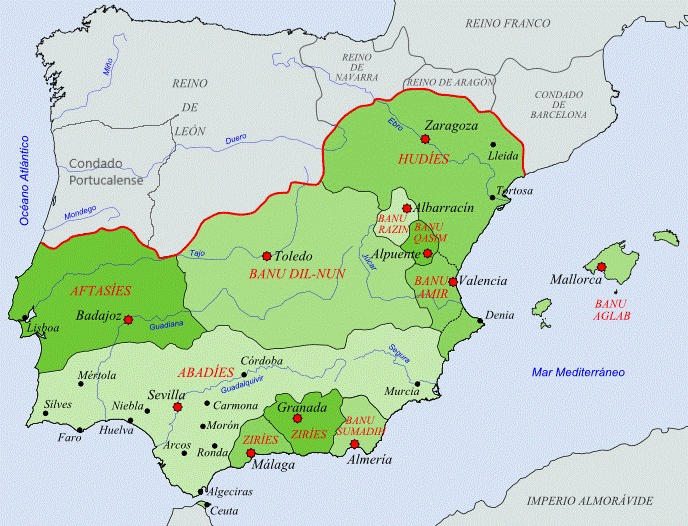
Map of the Tafia Kingdoms 1031

==== Almoravid Dynasty ====
In 1089, the Asturians captured Toledo after the disintegration of the Umayyad Caliphate on al-Andalus. The historian Houssain Kettani states that "The Andalusian [from al-Andalus] Muslims then requested the help of Almoravid Muslim Dynasty" who "stopped the advance of the Christians at the Battle of Zallaqa (Arabic for slippery) or the Battle of Sagrajas in 1086." Under the Almoravids, Christian forces captured Zaragoza (1139) and Lisbon (1147).

==== Almohad Caliphate ====
The Almoravids were replaced by the Almohad Caliphate in 1147. They lost a large amount of land to Christian conquerors after their defeat at the Battle of Oqab or Las Navas de Tolosa in 1212. After this, they lost the Balearic Islands (1228-1232), Badajoz (1229), Córdoba (1236), Valencia (1238), Murcia (1243), Cartagena (1245), Seville (1248), Huelva (1250), Arcos (1262), Medina-Sidonia (1262), Jerez (1262), Cádiz (1262), and Tarifa (1294).

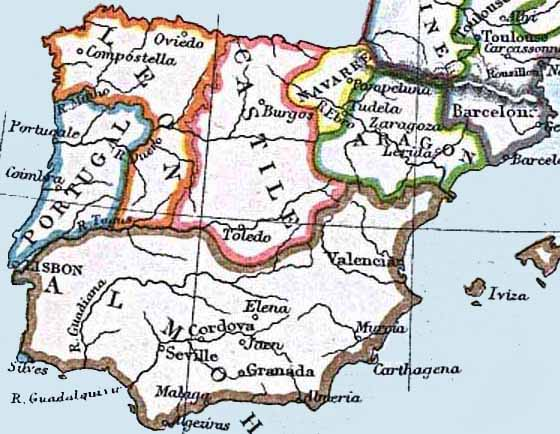
Map of the Iberian Peninsula 1210; al-Andalus is outlined in brown.

==== Nasrid Dynasty ====
The Nasrid Dynasty was created in 1232. It continuously shrank with the captures of Baeza (1487), Malaga (1487), Almería (1487), Almuñécar (1489), and Salobreña (1489). The capture of Grenada (1492) "marks the end of Muslim rule in the Iberian Peninsula" which was under Islamic control for around 781 years.

=== The Catholic Church ===
Early on in the eleventh Century, the Catholic Church declared Muslims, specifically Moors, infidels as a way to unite all of Christendom around a single cause. Heston states that "The Church in Rome [the Catholic Church] and other Christians to the north envied the prosperity of southern Spain" which was controlled primarily by Moors. There were multiple military campaigns in the eleventh century, primarily in Aragón and Castile, aimed at driving Moors off of the continent they had occupied since the eighth century. These actions were led by the Church and shifted from battles to a full blown crusade. They also served as a precursor to the Crusades to the Holy Land, which began in 1095, as well as the Inquisition. During the First Crusade, Pope Urban II actively worked to divert forces from Jerusalem to al-Andalus, calling the Moors a "threat" and arguing that they needed to be driven off their lands. In the 1100s, Urban II offered indulgences to men who were willing to fight on the peninsula, but only when Christian states were in extreme danger. This was an incentive that was offered to crusaders who "taken the cross" for the Holy Land. Additionally, only people from the peninsula itself or from neighboring lands were supposed to be diverted from their original purpose. In the 1200s, fighting crusades in the Baltics and al-Andalus was "thought to merit the same rewards as fighting in the Holy Land." As a result, many were given indulgences for fighting "infidels" in these regions where it had not been allowed in the previous century. The inability of crusaders to keep Jerusalem under Christian control prompted many to blame outside groups for the losses instead of their own (lack of) military might, which led to the Inquisition. There were three different monastic groups for whom the Inquisition became their "special responsibility." In 1209, the Cathars began overseeing the Inquisition. That authority was then passed to the Dominicans in 1233, during which time the form of the Spanish Inquisition as it is known today was created. Specifically, it developed after the capture of Córdoba in 1236 which was during the Valencian Crusade. The Christians who conquered the town built a church on top of the mosque (the same one that al-Mansur had beefed up using pieces from the Church of St. James) as was a common practice at the time. They also forcibly converted Mudéjars and Jews who remained; those that converted were subject to suspicion and many were the victims of torture. Additionally, Christians viewed "bathing as sacrilegious" and destroyed bathhouses located around the region. In 1246, a year after the signing of the al-Azraq Treaty of 1245 and a year before the ensuing Mudéjar revolts, responsibility for the Inquisition was passed to the Franciscans. In 1492, Ferdinand and Isabella expelled all of the Jews from Spain, resulting in a large migration of Muslims and Jews who still practiced their faith, as well as those who had converted to Christianity, from the country. The last execution for heresy in Spain took place in 1826 and the Inquisition did not end until 1834.

=== Religious Cohabitation ===
Historically, the mingling of peoples from the different Abrahamic faiths, including marriage, was common and seen as widely accepted by those in society. According to historians Robert I. Burns and Paul E. Chevedden, the al-Azraq Treaty is a representation of the religious diversity of al-Andalus and illustrates how Muslims, Jews, and Christians were able to not just coexist, but work together at a time when the Catholic church was ramping up its persecution of those they deemed "heretics". Burns and Chevedden state that "The Arabic secretariat of the Christian chancery, which was staffed by Jews, drafted the Arabic text of the treaty, and the Muslim and Christian parties agreement ratified the dual language version of the charter." In addition to working alongside one another at the ground level, those who ruled territories often crossed religious divides and worked with one another if secular interests were put at stake. When the Abbasid dynasty came to power in Baghdad they asked Charlemagne to attack the Umayyads in Córdoba and elsewhere in al-Andalus. Latin and Eastern Christian leaders also often sought help from their Muslim counterparts. Furthermore, Heston states that "Jews had welcomed Muslim rule as more tolerant than that of Christians, with many Jews migrating from other parts of Europe to Al-Andalus." In 1235, during the Valencian Crusade, Pope Gregory IX published the bull cum hora undecima. This allowed Dominican and Franciscan preachers to permit "schismatics who have rejoined the church to cohabit and be in contact with their apparently still schismatic relatives." The bull conflates Muslims, Jews, schismatics, and other groups into the same category of heretical non-Christians while "allow[ing] for a hierarchy of otherness in which European Christians stood higher than others." This bull was reissued again in 1245 by Pope Innocent IV, the year the al-Azraq Treaty was signed.

== Background ==
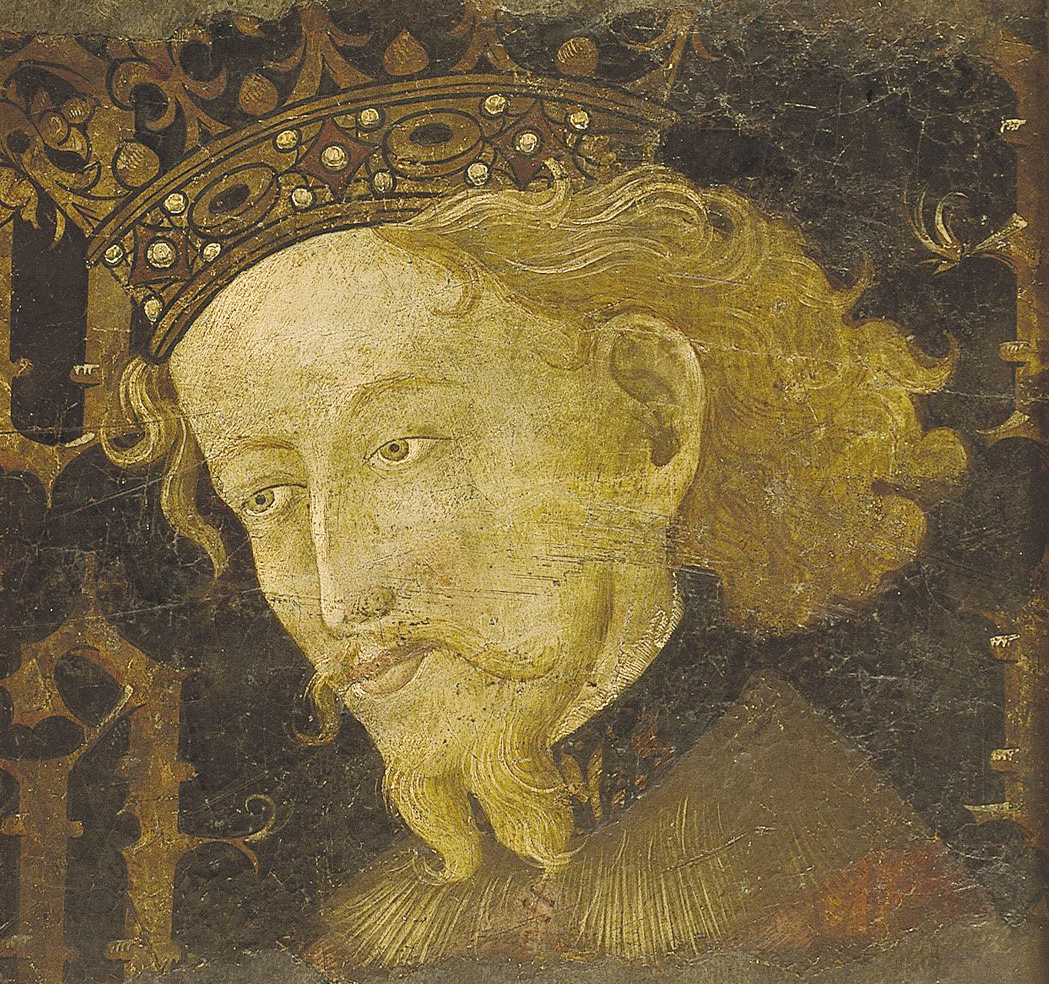
Jaume I, King of Aragon by Gonçal Peris Sarrià and Jaume Mateu (1427)

James I was one of the main proponents of the crusade against the Moors in Valencia which began in 1232 and officially ended with the signing of the al-Azraq Treaty in 1245. During the crusade, he tapped into his vast supply of vassals, "who had sworn 'homage and fealty'" to their king in exchange for land, in order to fill the ranks of his military. He also utilized the strategy of siege warfare which involved less risk than direct confrontation and often resulted in the gain of new territories. His strategy when attacking a region was two pronged: 1. focus all troops on the strongest fortress (physical) and 2. instill as much fear into the surrounding populace as possible (psychological). Historian Donald J. Kagay suggests that "sites might also come into the Conqueror's [James I's] hands without direct combat due to a combination of Muslim fear and the king's well known reputation for granting ostensibly liberal surrender terms." For example, the King would give defeated Moors "up to five days to vacate the conquered fortress with everything they could carry." Moors, on the other had, primarily used raiding which, like siege warfare, involved low risk and high reward. They also paid mercenaries to fight alongside them and relied on aid from the Almohad Caliphate in North Africa. The city of Valencia fell to James I in 1238 after a "long and bitter" siege; at the time the only agreement that was reached was the withdrawal of Moors from the city. In addition to military might, James I brought down the city via the bribery of one of al-Azraq's counselors. This left the leader unable to pay his hired soldiers. Historians determine that "military incompetence" is the reason for the loss of al-Andalus since Moors relied heavily on outside forces to support their military while Christian forces were "experienced" and "organized for war."

== The Al-Azraq Treaty ==
The treaty is a thin piece of parchment 25 by 40 centimeters in size and torn where Alfonso's seal has been removed. The Arabic lines are not a translation of the Castilian; instead they are a continuation of the treaty, interweaving with one another to complete the document. Each portion of the treaty conveys a different tone: the Castilian part conveys a tone of partnership and servitude while the Arabic conveys only a brief truce.

=== Castilian Lines ===
The fourteen lines of Castilian (which is influenced by Aragónese) are crowded onto the page and make up the first and last lines of the treaty. This portion of the treaty is broken up into two parts:

==== Al-Azraq's Portion ====
- Al-Azraq is Alfonso's vassal.
  - Specifically aligning with the Aragónese form.
- Eight castles and their surrounding lands are given to Alfonso at the time the treaty was signed.
- The castles Alcalá and Perpunchent are given to al-Azraq's family.
  - These were al-Azraq's main territories.
- Allowed to keep his other four castles for three years, giving half the profits to Alfonso when the treaty was signed.
  - All revenue was handed over at the end of the three years.
- A provision is included that allows him to acquire more castles from other rebels.
  - If he does this, he must also give half the revenue to Alfonso immediately and all revenues to him after three years.

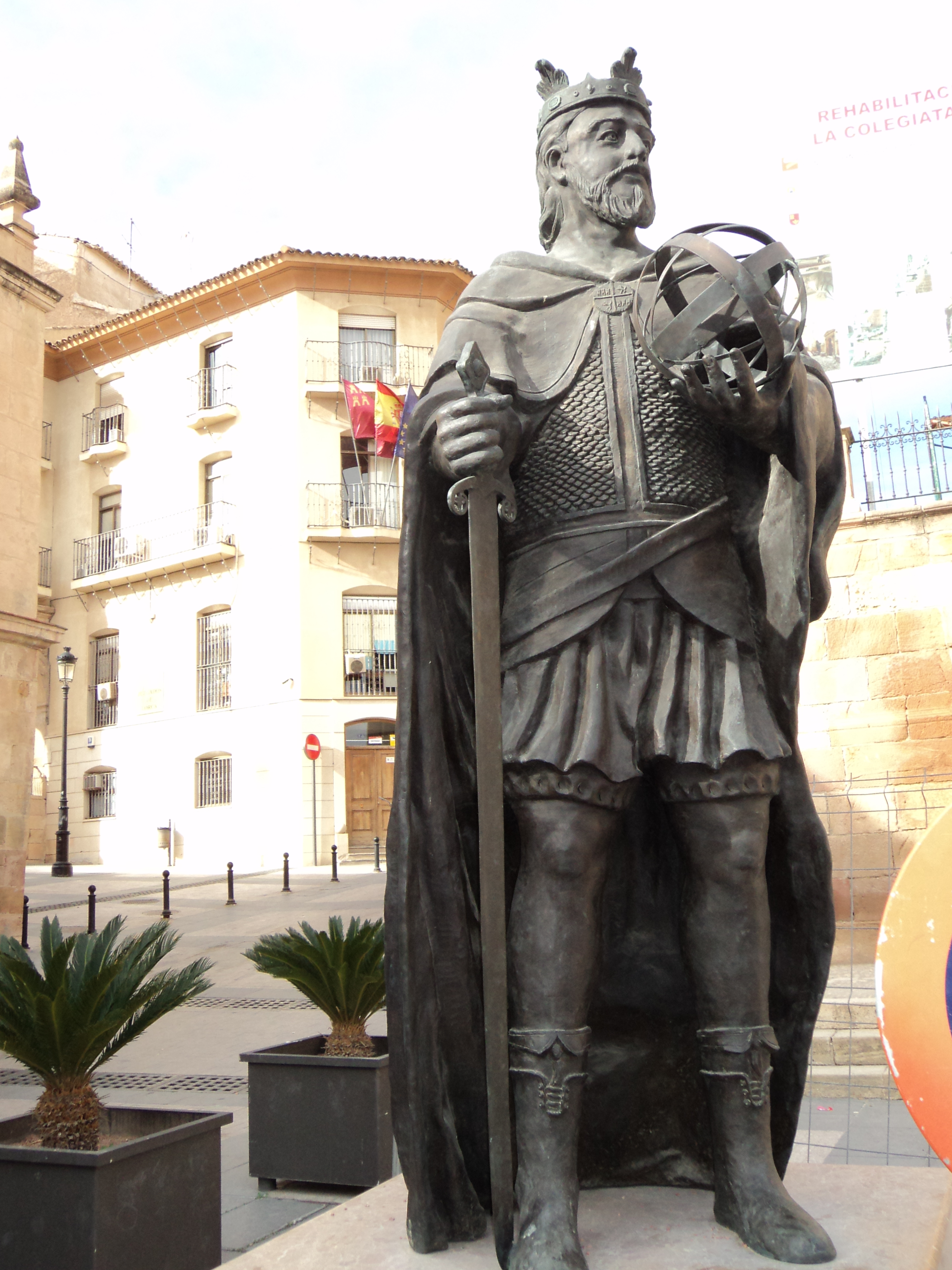
Rey Alfonso X de España [King Alfonso X of Spain] statue Plaza de España in Lorca, Spain

==== Alfonso's Portion ====
- Alfonso received al-Azraq as a vassal.
- Two castles are given to al-Azraq
- The revenue from the villages of Ebo and Tollos are also given to him for three years.
- The Castilian lines end with Alfonso swearing to honor the treaty as long as al-Azraq remains his vassal.

=== Arabic Lines ===
There are thirteen lines in Arabic (written in Maghribī script) that appear larger, more evenly spaced, and fainter due to oxidation of the ink.

- The tone is business-like and there is no mention of vassalage as in the Castilian lines.
- The mention of Alfonso as "the Exalted Prince" is the only reference to al-Azraq holding a lower status.
- There is no mention of time other than the statement that al-Azraq could keep his "own main castles for 'the duration of the reign of the Exalted Prince.'"
- Al-Azraq's rights are then outlined.

This was not the first time that a Christian monarch had tried to make a vassal out of a defeated Muslim leader in a surrender treaty. A peace treaty between Alfonso VIII of Castile and Zayd, a king of Valencia, also acts as a vassalage agreement since Alfonso VIII is described as receiving Zayd as a vassal. Furthermore, the treaty between the two leaders also illustrates that al-Azraq was also not the first Muslim leader to break a vassalage agreement with a Christian monarch. Alfonso VIII's chronicler states that "A peace treaty was signed between them, which later the aforementioned Zayd of Valencia broke like a vile apostle, without any just cause."

=== Influences on the Treaty ===
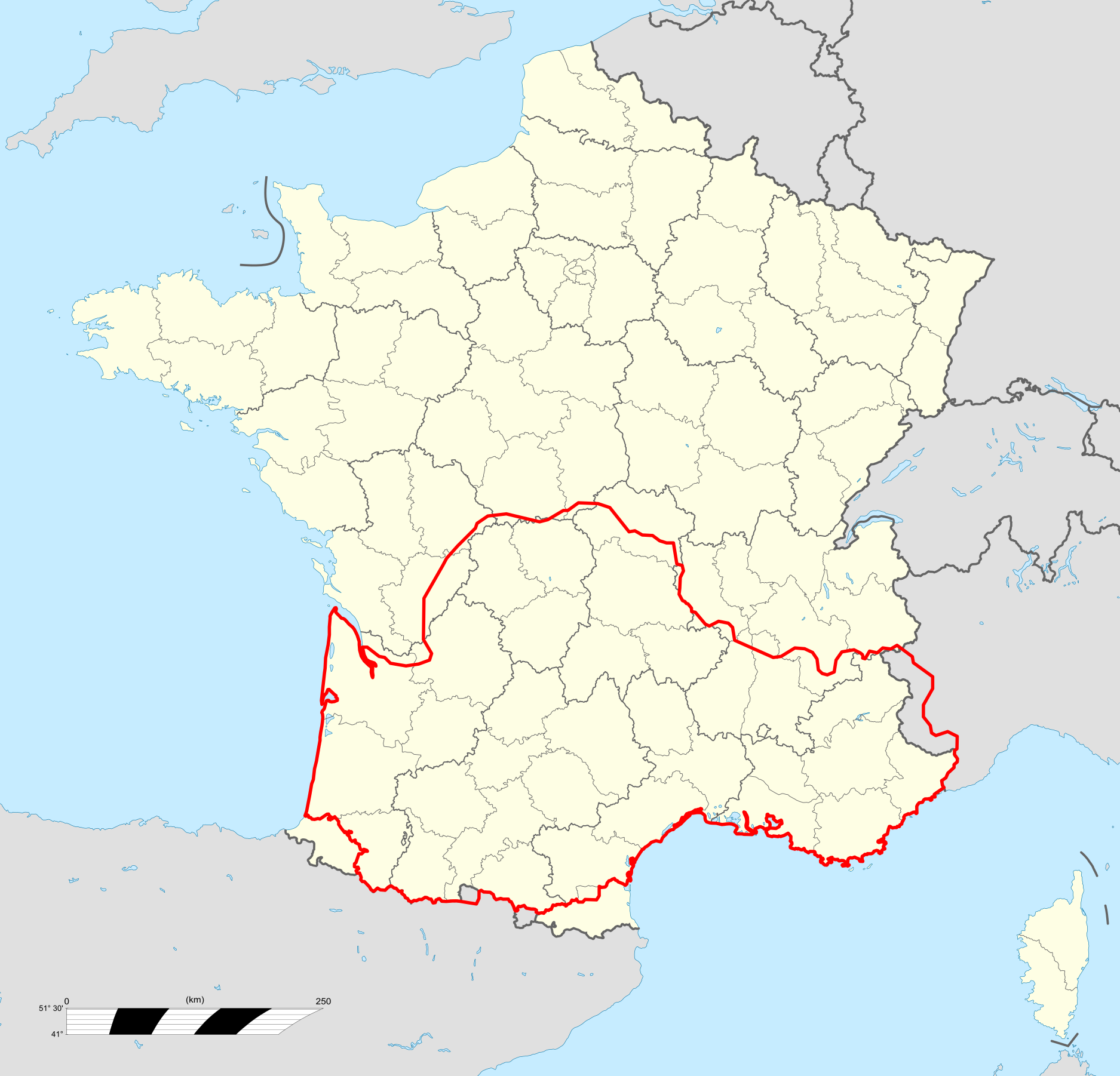
Map of the Occitan region, modern-day France

There were multiple factors that influenced the wording of the treaty and the terms that were set forth:

1. Al-Azraq was surrounded and potential support from allies had disappeared since Mudéjar strongholds of Xátiva and Dénia had surrendered to James I and the rest of the country was in Christian hands. His allies in North Africa were also locked in conflict and were unable to offer him aid.
2. James I's territory had been facing encroachment from Francia for around a decade and by 1245 they had begun to take portions of Western Occitania. In order to regain this territory, James had planned the marriage between the Count of Toulouse and the heiress of the county of Provence, Beatriu, which the father was a first cousin of James I. This would, in theory, void any treaty made by Francia and place the territory back in his hands.
  1. It did not work out this way and the territory ended up staying with Francia, now part of modern-day France.
3. Pope Innocent IV had announced another crusade that was intended to aid Jerusalem after crusader armies had lost the city to Muslims in July 1244. King Louis IX of France announced that he would join the Pope's crusade. Since they were rivals, James I declared that he would not be joining the Pope's crusade, but instead would be starting his own. He intended to "rescue" Byzantium while on his way to Jerusalem. This crusade was set to begin in 1246 and was announced three months before the al-Azraq treaty was signed.

James I needed to wrap things up with the Valencian Crusade in order to be able to shift his troops to protect Aragón borders from Francia and prepare the rest of his troops for another crusade to the Holy Land. Al-Azraq had run out of allies by this point and was forced to accept the terms of surrender. The desperation both parties felt also gives context to why it is lenient in al-Azraq's favor since James I did not know how close his opponent was to defeat.

==== Feudalism ====
Historian R.J. Barendse states that, while feudalism has both Roman and Germanic origins, it "was essentially a new system, arising out of military changes and tensions with the agrarian economy and society in the tenth century rather than being a synthesis" of the other two. It existed in various forms in other parts of the world, but in Western Europe it developed during the Carolingian Empire's deterioration of authority in the tenth century. It then spread to regions such as al-Andalus, England, Scandinavia, and other parts of Europe. The parceling out of lands created a class that was able to collectively amass more power than their sovereign and the Church. Barendse also argues that feudalism specifically subjugated peasants and "[f]eudal armies were predominantly instruments for the subjugation of the peasantry" as were "symbols of feudalism" such as "illegally erected castles." During the tenth and eleventh centuries, as land was parceled out in smaller chunks, a new "class of mounted and armored warriors" was created in which the different Christian kingdoms were able to draw military power from. Furthermore, there was also an overall increase in agricultural productivity during these centuries along with the development of trade routes. This allowed for more power and wealth to become centralized into the hands of a few, such as rich farmers and merchants. In the Islamic world, vassalage was not practiced as it was in the West which is one of the reasons the Arabic lines of the treaty make no mention of it. Mamlukism is the closest equivalent, in which men were enslaved and then imported from areas such as the Caucasus, Uzbekistan, and Kazakhstan, all of which came from horse archer/warrior cultures. They also tended to have Turkish tribal origins; in the tenth century, Turks were absorbed and converted in large numbers by Islamic states. Mamluks went through years of intense training to be properly prepared for warfare and they were kept in isolation in order to prevent them from forming bonds with the local people and to encourage loyalty to their Sultan.

== Aftermath ==
=== New Laws ===
Common Law in Aragón was becoming heavily influenced by the old beliefs of Rome which can be seen in different edicts enacted by James I. This was due in part because of the influence of universities in Bologna and Montpellier whose students graduated and went to work in the court of Aragón and its judiciary. In 1238, James I issued the Regni Valentie, a territorial code dictating the governance of the newly conquered Valencia that was heavily inspired by Justinian's Digest. In it, a wide variety of actions are marked as "treasonous": "Acts of rebellion against royal authority, including counterfeiting and inciting townsmen or villagers to riot," "conspir[ing] with the enemy or travel[ing] through enemy territory without royal permission," as well as "family members who murdered any of their relatives and then would not submit to royal officials for punishment." It also included rules surrounding vassalage. In Aragón, a practice known as "defiance" allowed "aggrieved vassals ten days to formally abrogate ties with their lords" and those "who violated this 'cooling-off period' in any way would be considered a 'proven traitor'." Those convicted of treason were typically beheaded, but were supposed to have been convicted only after evidence of "true, legitimate, and clear proofs" had been presented. In 1242, James I issued decrees warning people not to insult converts to Catholicism specifically by calling them a "renegade" or a "turncoat." He also declared that Muslim members of a convert's family could not take their property while the aforementioned convert was still alive. Another edict, the Fueros de Aragón, was presented in 1247 and was written in the vernacular (whereas the Regni Valentie was written completely in Latin). In this code, James I stated that any person who did not comply was to be charged as committing treason against their monarch. In 1256, near the end of the Mudéjars revolt, Alcoi was established as a Christian town in a region that had been predominantly Moorish before its defeat. The town was established for defensive purposes in an attempt to protect Valencia from attacks by al-Azraq and his troops. The Christians populace in this new city did not remain isolated; while not having property in the town itself, Mudéjars continued to hold lands surrounding Alcoi.

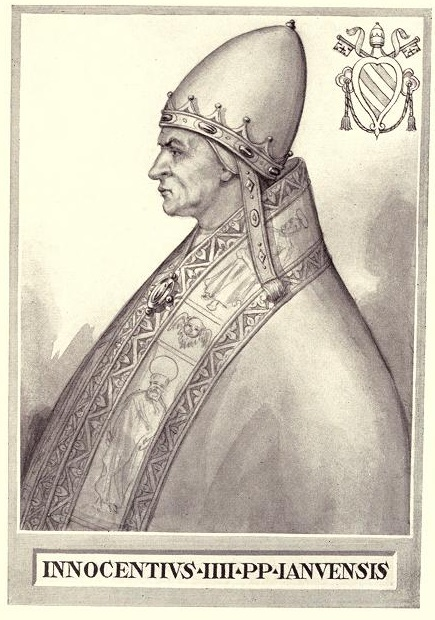
Pope Innocent IV by Artaud de Montor (1842)

=== Mudéjar Revolt of 1247 ===
In 1247, two years after the al-Azraq Treaty was signed, the Mudéjar leader and his troops began a revolt that lasted until 1258. Bruns and Chevedden consider this to be a "counter crusade" by the Mudéjars. In December 1247, James I declared a general expulsion of Mudéjars from Aragón, Catalonia, and Valencia after al-Azraq took control of multiple castles in Valencia, including Penàguila which was "a place of 'importance and honor.'" While the clergy and average citizens were for the plan, James I's barons were against it since many of their tenants were Mudéjars and their expulsion would cost them money. Muslims began rioting across Valencia and more castles fell to their forces. James I then marched "a hundred thousand" Mudéjars to Castile and Granada. As the war ramped up, Mudéjar forces in Northern Valencia "defeated an invading Christian host of three thousand, killing four hundred or five hundred." In the South, they besieged Christian defensive positions at Peñacadel or Benicadell castle. In the spring and summer of 1248, James I conducted sieges against the Mudéjar cities of Lucente and Xátiva, relieved the castle being attacked, and killed the rebel leader Ibn Bassāl. They also managed to drive the Mudéjar forces back to al-Azraq's base at Alcalá. Pope Innocent IV intervened multiple times throughout the war, dispatching members of the church to regions of James I's kingdom as well sending out financial appeals and letters as a way to garner aid. On 13 November 1249, he published a "crusade circular" stating that the Muslims were "'infidel people still walking in darkness' and slavery" and were persecuting Christians. He stated that those who "take up the sign of the living cross, to give that king [James I] assistance against those people [Muslims]" via fighting in his army, would receive "full pardon of their sins." With this bull, Burns states that Innocent IV made the war into a full blow crusade against al-Azraq and Mudéjars on the Peninsula. At some point during the counter crusade, "al-Azraq came to James and said he wanted to become a Christian and marry a relative of the lord of Dénia. James rode to al-Azraq's castle of Rugat, where his small party was savagely ambushed and the king himself nearly killed." A clear date was not given for this encounter between the two leaders. In 1250, a diplomatic shift to the war began as al-Azraq sent a letter in Arabic to Queen Violante in which he acknowledged James I's rule over Valencia. According to Burns, "The convention of accepting a Christian ruler as having some extrinsic claims over one's resources or territory was a ploy common enough in frontier warfare and rationalized in Islamic terms." The two leaders exchanged envoys with Joan de Muracting acting as Violante's and Abū 'al-Hasan (al-Azraq's cousin) and Abū l'-Qāsim acting as al-Azraq's. The Mudéjar leader announced the preparation of his embassy to the leaders of Aragón a week before Innocent IV sent a letter to James I. The letter used stronger language than his previous ones and continued to offer indulgences for those who fought on the Peninsula. Berns states that this meant the king "had opened negotiations with his enemy at the very time he was seeking renewed crusade status and military aid from the pope." Innocent IV also wrote to different Orders, such as the Templars and Hospitallers, pushing his crusading beliefs on the organizations and seeking aid. A truce occurred between the two sides around February 1258 (called the Truce of Easter 1258) brokered by Castile. Al-Azraq formed a semi-alliance with Alfonso X which backfired and triggered James I's final push during the years 1257–1258. He besieged the stronghold of Alcalá between April and June 1258 and the city's defeat ended the war with a Christian victory. A treaty was signed in July of that year; Al-Azraq was then exiled to North Africa. Like the Valencian Crusade, this war ended partially because James I bribed someone in al-Azraq's inner circle, depriving him of the funds he needed to buy grain to feed his troops. In his autobiography, James I spends fifteen chapters speaking about the Mudéjar revolt of 1247 and tries his best to down play it, claiming it lasted "a good three or four years" instead of ten. He is also the first one to identify the name of the Mudéjar leader heading the revolt, calling him "al-Azraq Our traitor" and "al-Azraq Our betrayer" since he had violated the terms of their surrender treaty. Al-Azraq returned to the Iberian Peninsula and al-Andulas in 1260 to help lead another Mudéjar revolt. He was killed at the Battle of Alcoi in 1276. The revolt of 1260 ended in much the same way as the one in 1247.
