= Arcos de la Frontera =

- Municipality
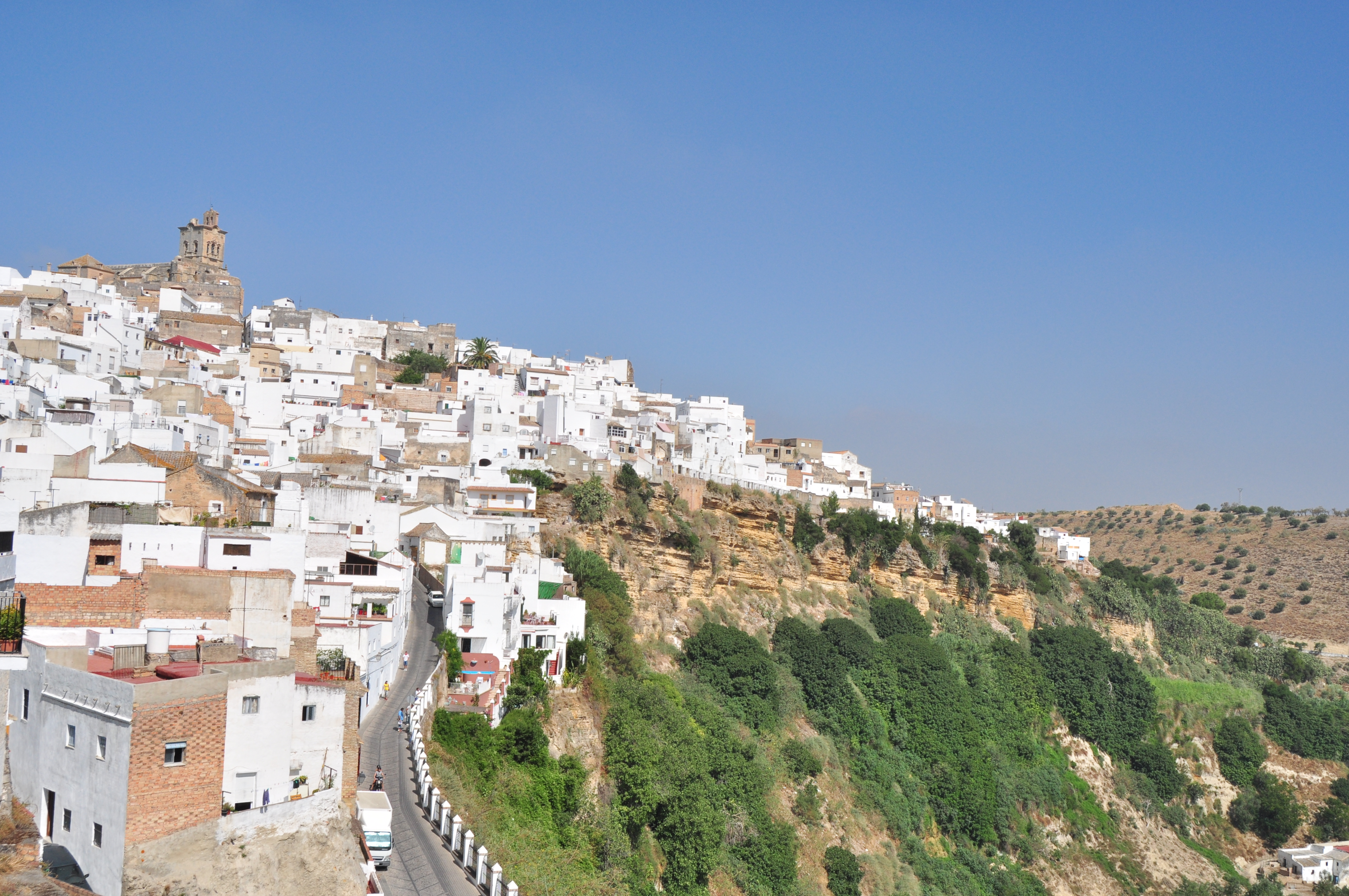
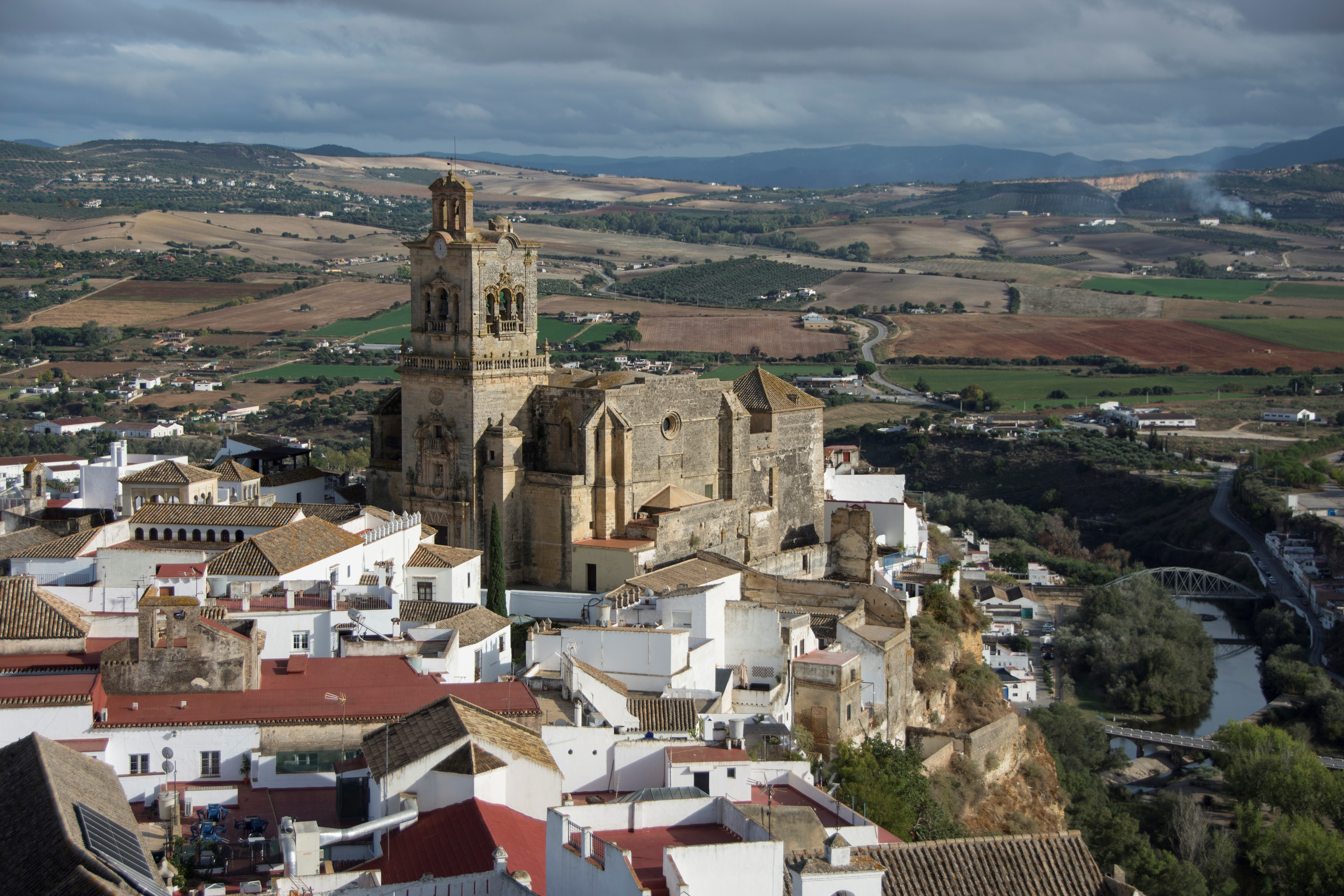
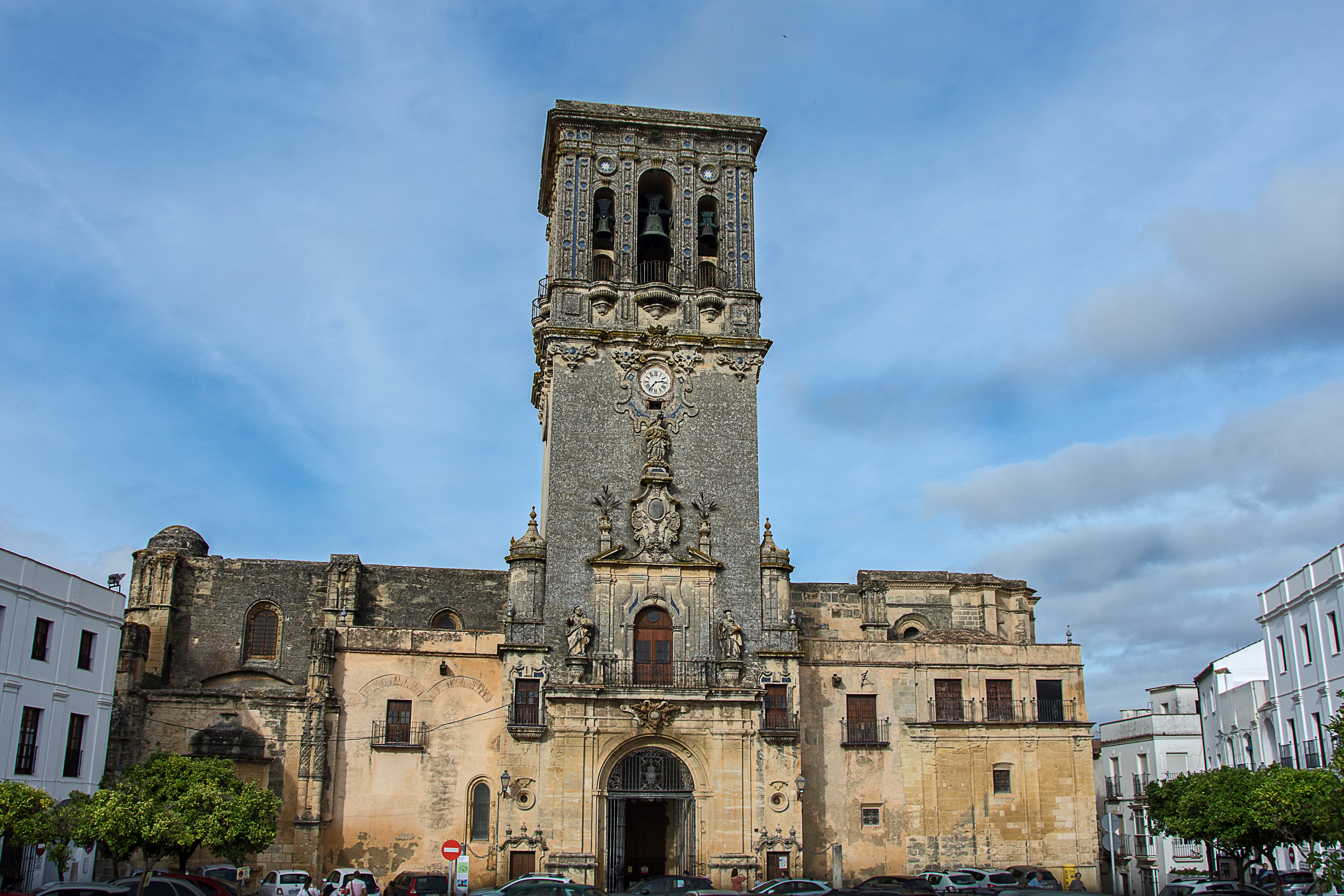
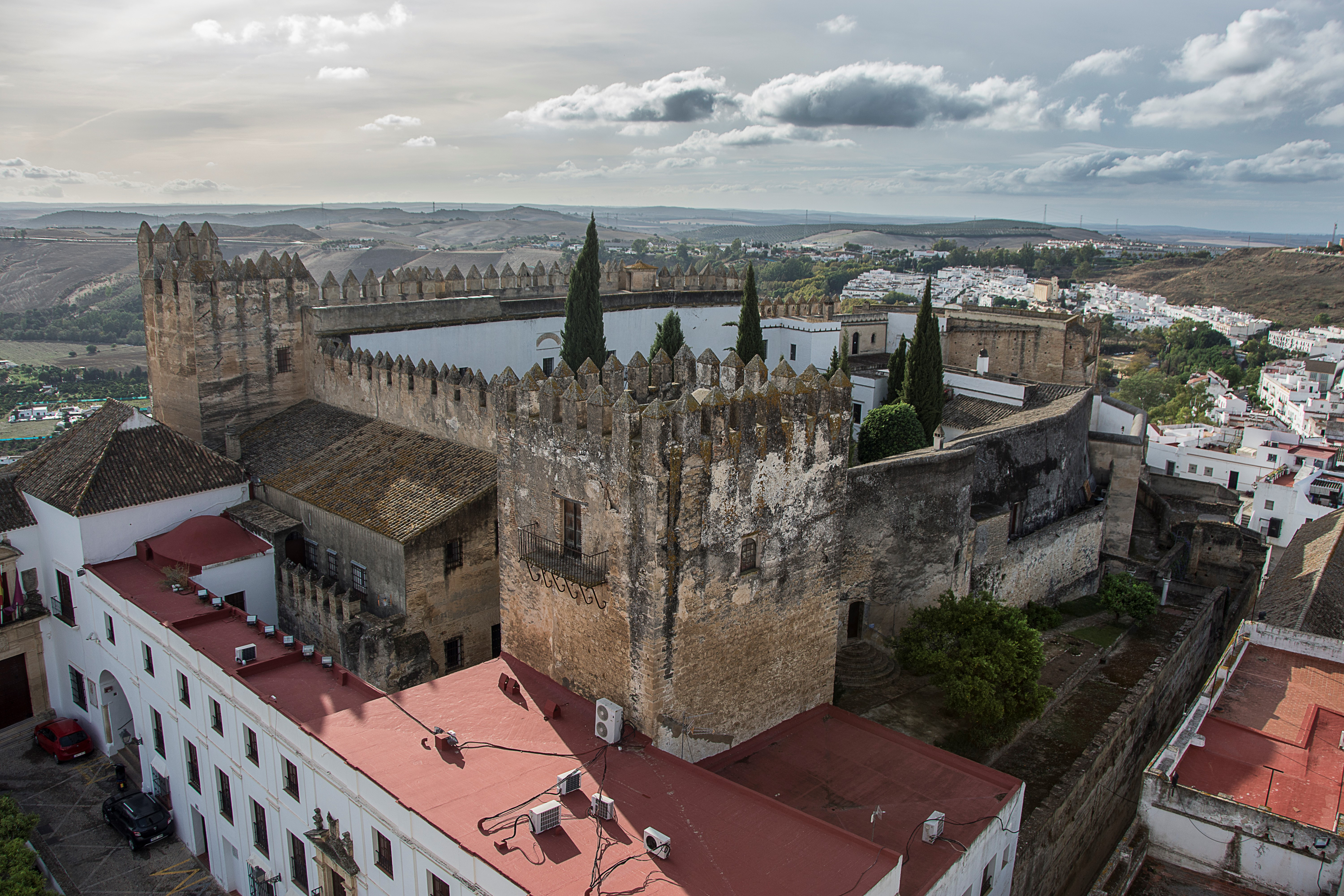
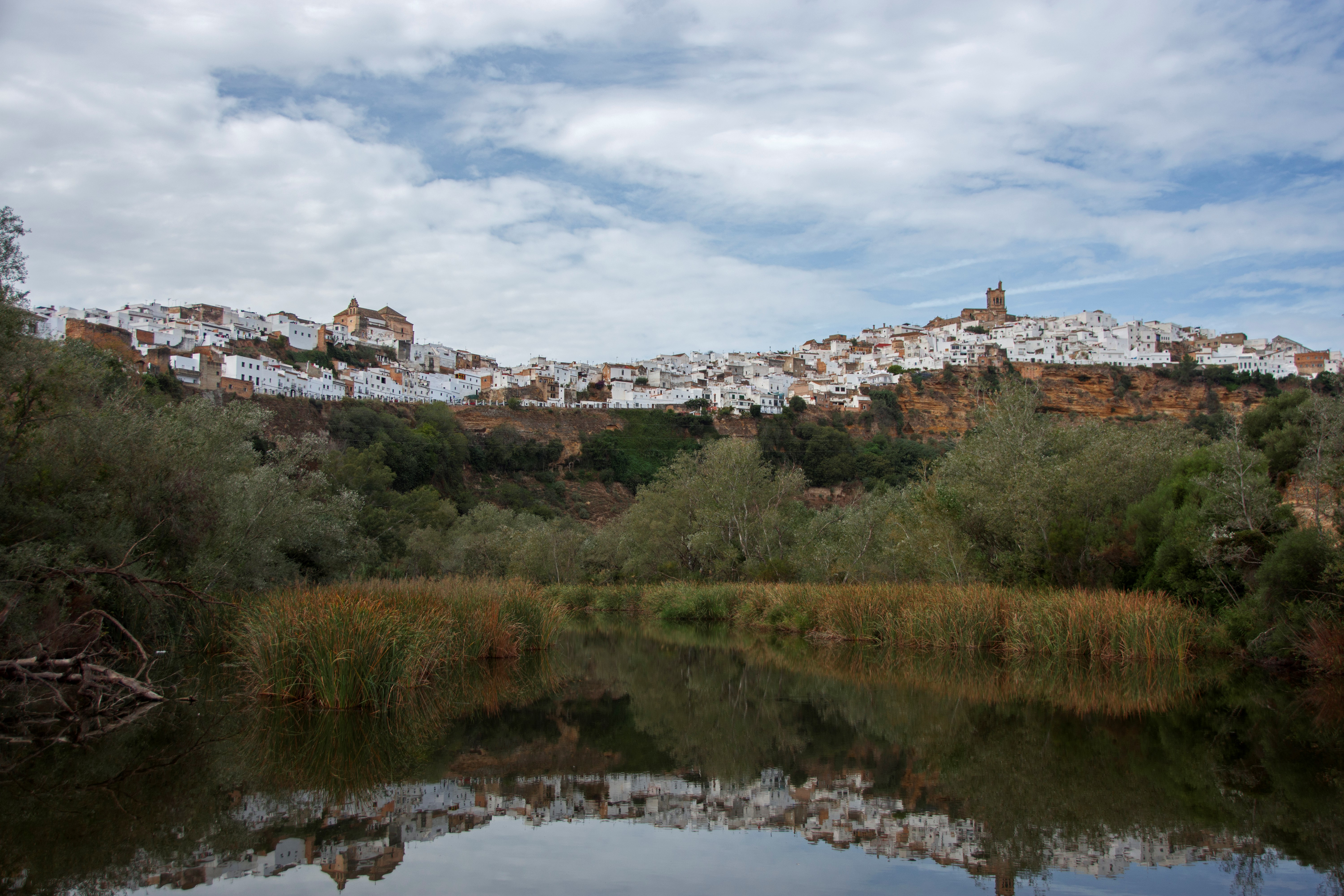

- Flag Coat of arms

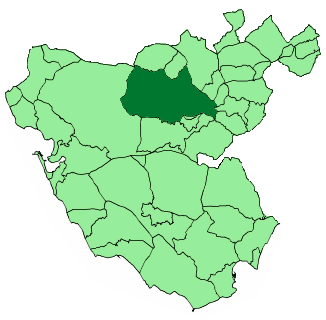

- Location in the Province of Cádiz Arcos de la Frontera (Andalusia) Arcos de la Frontera (Spain)
- Coordinates: 36°45′N 5°48′W
- Country: Spain
- Autonomous community: Andalusia
- Province: Cádiz
- Comarca: Sierra de Cádiz
- Municipality: Arcos de la Frontera

Government
  - Alcalde: Miguel Rodríguez Rodríguez (PP)

Area
  - Total: 527.54 km^{2} (203.68 sq mi)
- Elevation: 185 m (607 ft)

Population (2025-01-01)
  - Total: 31,267
  - Density: 59.269/km^{2} (153.51/sq mi)
- Demonyms: Arcense, Arcobricense
- Time zone: UTC+1 (CET)
  - Summer (DST): UTC+2 (CEST)
- Postal code: 11630
- Website: Official website

Spanish Cultural Heritage
- Type: Non-movable
- Criteria: Historic ensemble
- Designated: 15 March 1962
- Reference no.: RI-53-0000032

Arcos de la Frontera (Spanish pronunciation: [ˈaɾkos ðe la fɾonˈteɾa]) is a town and municipality in the Sierra de Cádiz comarca, province of Cádiz, in Andalusia, Spain.

== Location ==
Arcos de la Frontera is 64 km N-E of Cádiz and 35 km E-N-E of Jerez de la Frontera.

It is located on the right bank of the Guadalete river, with a part of the old town installed inside a sharp loop of the river - which flows at the foot of towering vertical cliffs, to Jerez and on to the Bay of Cádiz. The town commands a fine vista atop a sandstone ridge, from which the peak of Sierra de San Cristóbal and the Guadalete Valley can be seen.

Another strategic trait of its location is that it stands on the last western spurs of the subbetic chain.

The neighbouring municipios are Espera and Bornos to the north, Villamartín to the north-east, El Bosque and Prado del Rey to the east, Benaocaz and Ubrique to the south-east, Algar and San José del Valle to the south, and Jerez de la Frontera to the west.

== Toponymy ==
The Roman Arx-Arcis (« fortress on high ground ») became the Moorish Medina Arkos.

The town gained the latter part of its name by being the frontier of Spain's 13th-century battleground with the Moors.

== History ==
=== Prehistory and Roman era ===
There is local evidence that Stone Age cave-dwellers used rocks to form living chambers. Roman ruins also exist in the area.

In 1969 a hoard of 28 solidi was recovered in a building of the San Rafael farmstead in the municipality of Arcos de La Frontera. The Museo Arqueológico Nacional (MAN) acquired these in 1970. None of these solidi seem to post-date 408 A.D. and some argue on that basis that the hoard was hidden or abandoned in 409-411 A.D; others argue that this was around 429 A.D., at the time when the Vandals crossed the Strait of Gibraltar on their way to Africa. All agree that the hoard was left behind after 409 A.D. when the Suebes and Vandals (Germanic tribes) and Alans (Iranian tribe) crossed the Pyrenees; these tribes were allies of the army under the usurper Constantine III.

At Sanlucareño or Sanlucarejo on Arcos municipio, a Visigoth necropolis from the 6th century is part of a group of similar necropolis spread on the neighbouring municipalities.

=== Moorish era ===
Arcos sided with Abd al-Rahman I (first emir of Córdoba 756–788) when the latter started his campaign against Yusuf al-Fihri (governor of al-Andalus 747-756); the town was subsequently sacked by Shakya b. Abd al-Wahid al-Miknasi (Note: Miknasi is a reminder of the Tunisian town Meknassy. But in South Spain, a map by E. Molina-Lopez and J. Bosch-Vilà of the largest Berber settlements established in Al-Andalus, shows several of those bearing the name Miknasa to the north and one to the north-west of Arcos.), who lead the largest and most dangerous Berber revolt against Abd al-Rahman I.

During the Arab-muwallad conflict at the end of the 9th century in the region of Seville, the rebel castillos of Arcos, Jerez and Medina Sidonia were assaulted by the troops of the emir ʿAbd Allāh.

Among the Zenata groups that settled in the area, were the Banū Izniyan who arrived in the time of Al-Hakam II (961–976) or Almanzor (976–1002); one of the Banū Izniyan families, the Banū Jizrūn, ended up in charge of Medina Sidonia, Arcos and Cádiz. Muhammad b. Abdun b. Jizrun was the third and last jizrūní king of the taifa of Arcos. Like his two predecessors, he held the title of ḥāŷib. The Jizrunis belonged to the tribal subgroup of Yarniyyān and had been brought to al-Andalus by Almanzor. After the civil war and the fall of their protectors from the Caliphate of Cordoba, they became independent at the beginning of the 11th century in the territories of the old cora of Sidonia: Cádiz, Qalšāna (Calcena), Jerez and Arcos. They moved the capital of the kingdom from Calcena to the fortress of Arcos because it was a much firmer defensive position.

Arcos became an independent Moorish taifa in 1011 during the protracted collapse of the Umayyad Caliphate of Córdoba. Arcos was associated with the emirate of Jerez by 'Abdun ibn Muhammad who ruled from c. 1029/1030 to 1053. Emir Al-Mutadid of Seville took over Arcos and its taïfa from a Berber chief in 1053.

In 1086 Yusuf ibn Tashfin stopped at Arcos on his way to Zallāḳa. (Note: Zallāḳa, which means "slippery ground" in Arabic, is the nickname given to the place where the battle of Sagrajas was fought, because of the immense bloodshed that made the ground slippery.)

The region was overtaken by the Almoravid dynasty in 1091. From 1145 to 1147 the region of Arcos and Jerez was briefly a taifa under dependency of Granada, led by Abu'l-Qasim Ahyal.

The Almohad caliph Yaʿḳūb al-Manṣūr, in his campaign of 1190 against Portugal, concentrated his troops at Arcos de la Frontera; from there he dispatched his cousin al-Sayyid Yaʿḳūb b. Abī Ḥafṣ against Silves, while he himself proceeded to lay siege to Torres Novas and Tomar.

=== Christian era ===
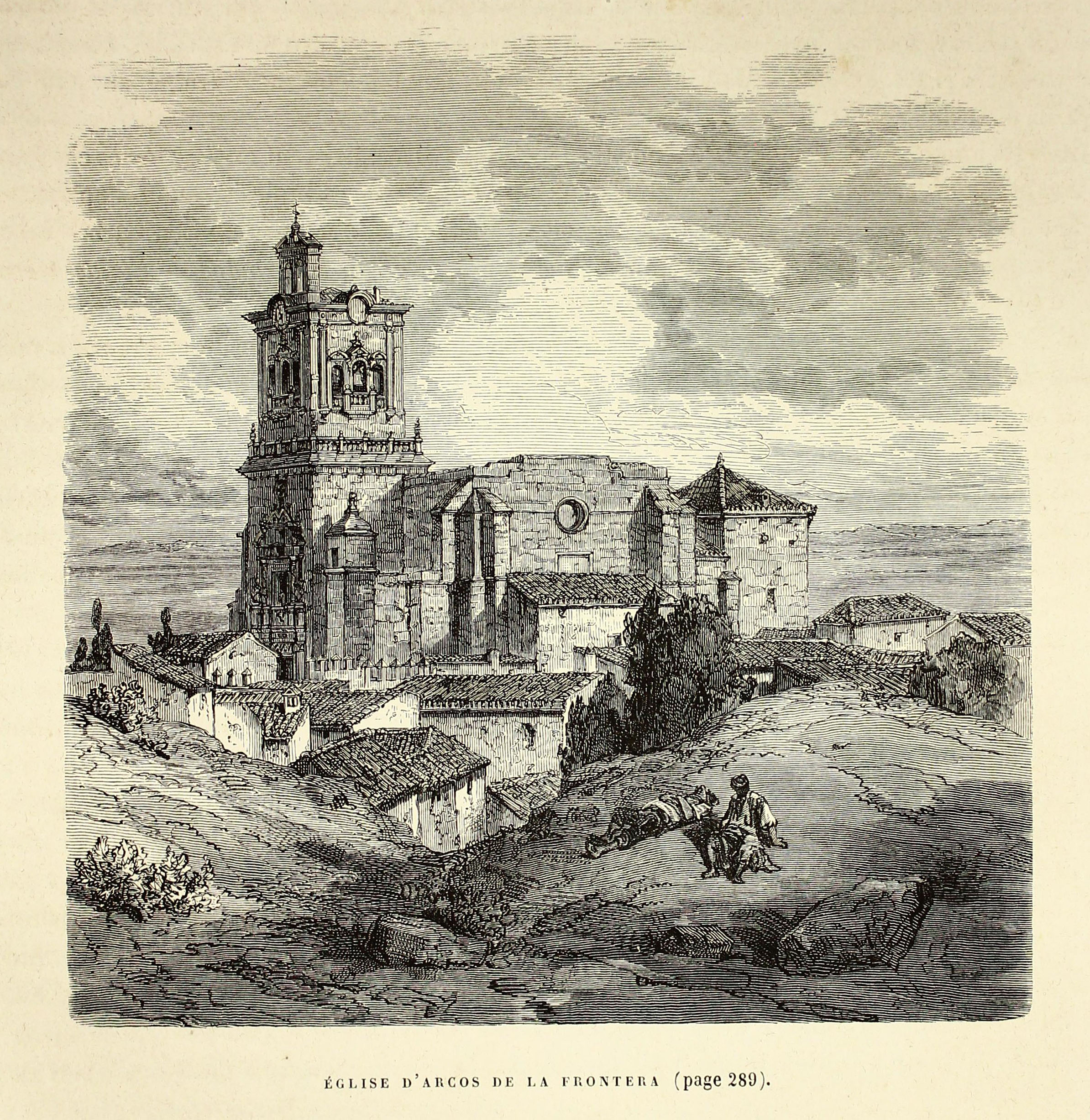
Church of San Pedro, 1874, by Gustave Doré in the work L'Espagne.

In 1250, Ferdinand III took possession of Arcos; its Moorish inhabitants rose in revolt the following year. It was reduced to submission in 1264 by Alfonso the Wise (1252–1284).

During the Andalusian campaign of the Marinid emir Abu al-Ḥasan — which resulted in his defeat at the battle of the Salado or Tarifa in 1340 —, his son Abū Mālik was ambushed in 1339 near Arcos by the Andalusian Councils and killed by the Barbate river marking the frontier between the two countries. Arcos territory was encroached upon by the Moors of Granada until 1452. Thus it was constantly kept on a war footing - hence its name "de la Frontera".

Alfonso X of Castile 'the Wise' had a Gothic cathedral constructed on a high ridge.

It is famed for its ten bells, which tolled throughout the war with the Moors. Several Moorish banners were taken in the nearby battle of Zahara and have been on display in a church in Arcos since 1483.

== Main sights ==
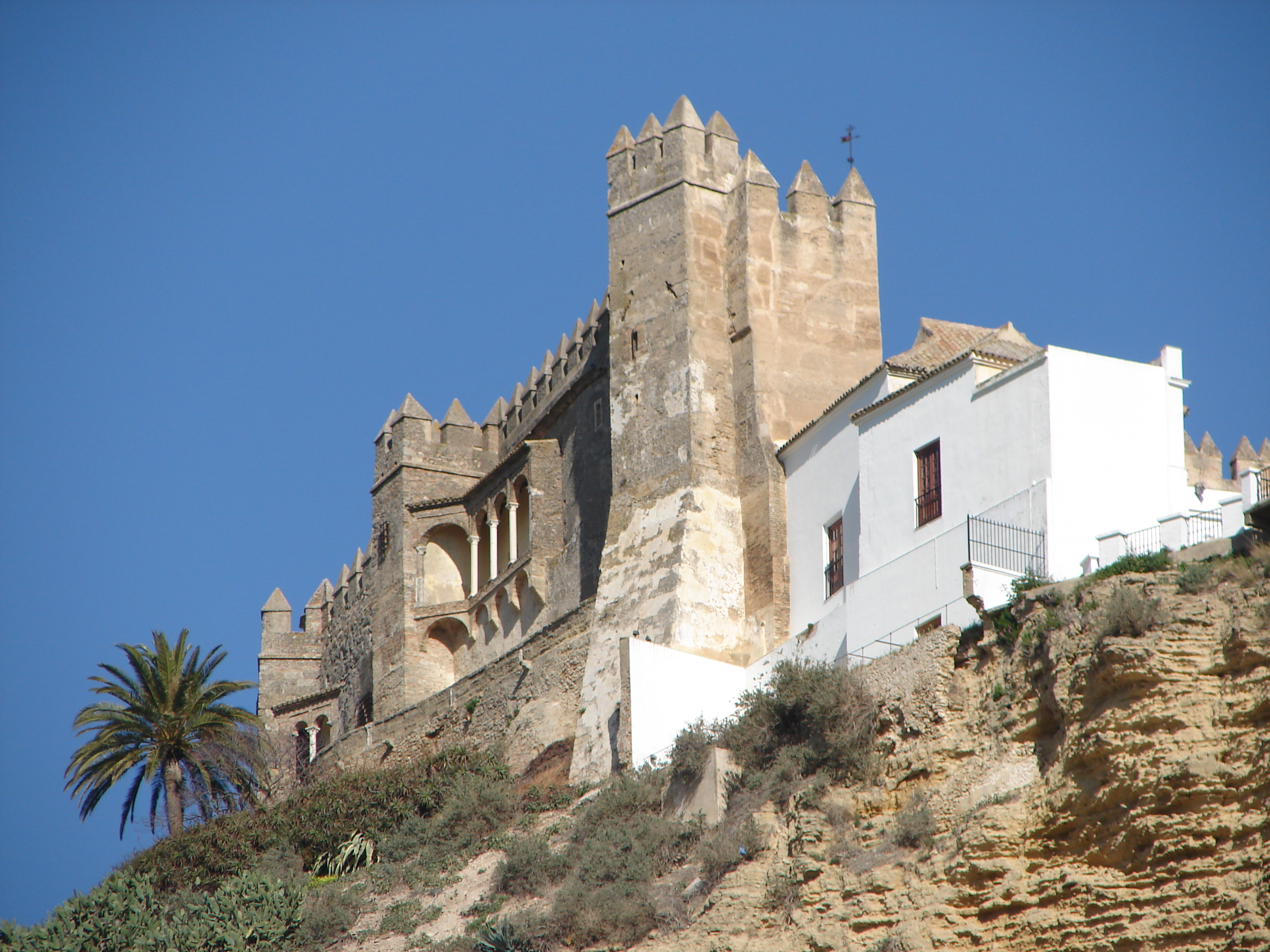
Castle of the Dukes of Arcos

- Castillo de Arcos (11th–15th-century castle), a medieval castle of Moorish origin, rebuilt almost entirely in the first half of the 15th century. Currently it is private property, not open to the public. It has a quadrangular plan with four towers at the corners. It was a military alcázar in the Muslim period. On the outside, the shields of the Dukes of Arcos are observed.
- Iglesia de la Caridad (church built between the 16th and 17th centuries)
- Basílica Menor de Santa María de la Asunción, erected after the Reconquista on a Visigothic temple and the remains of a 13th and 14th century mosque. The main facade is of Plateresque-Gothic style and the facade that faces Plaza del Cabildo is mostly Renaissance. Its unfinished tower, repaired after the 1755 Lisbon earthquake, has a Baroque air. Since 1931 it has been listed as an Artistic-Historic Monument (Bien de Interés Cultural).

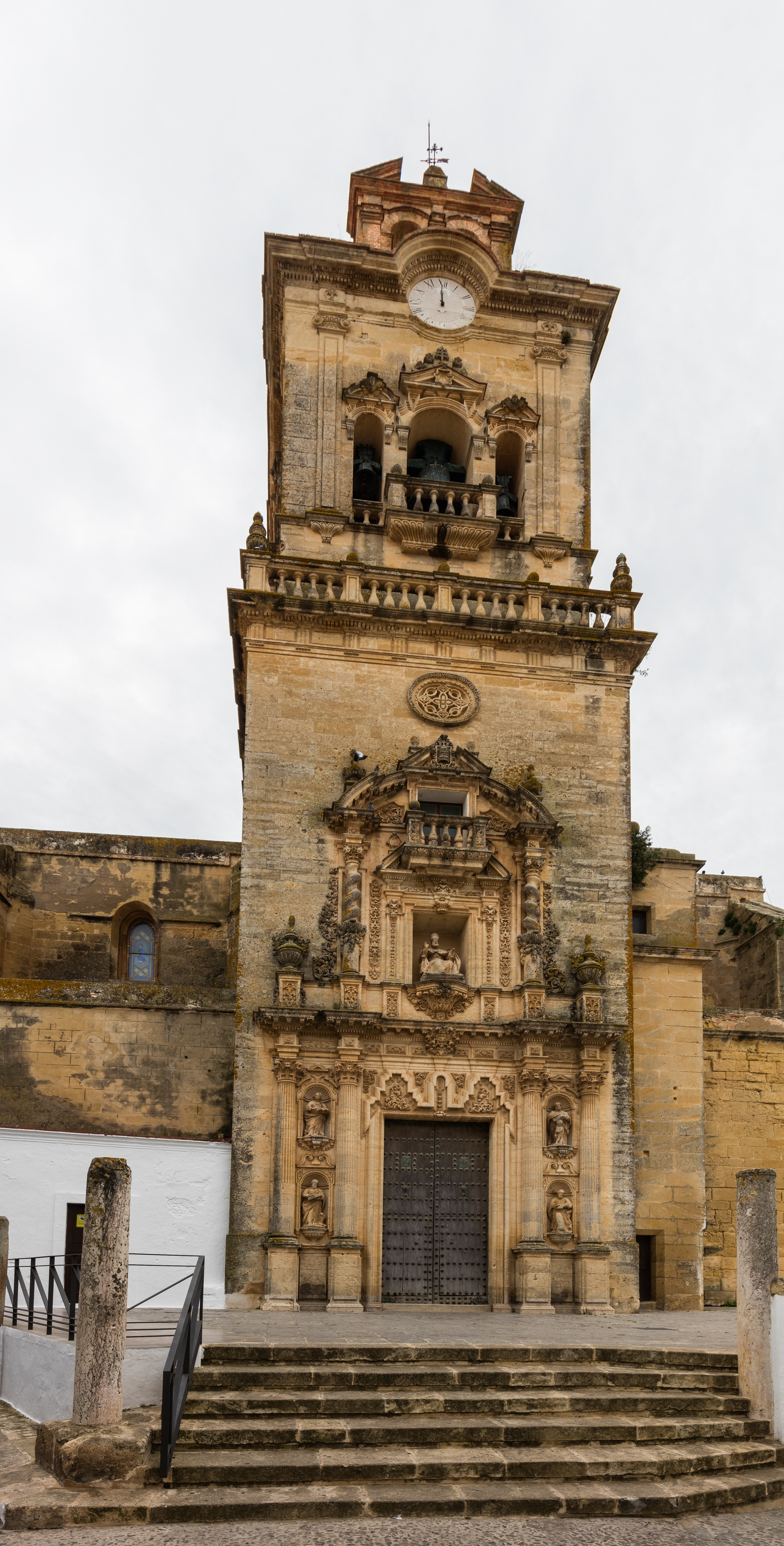
Church of San Pedro

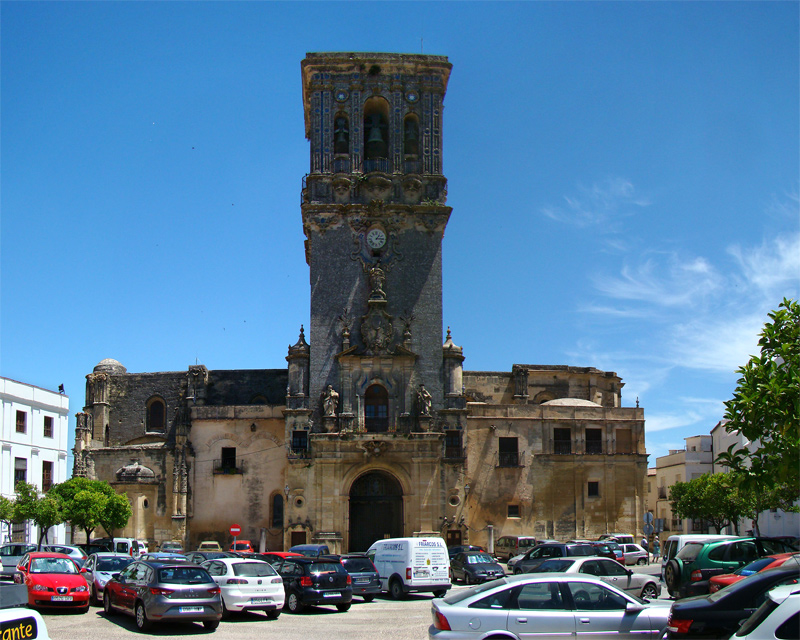
Church of Santa María de la Asunción

- Church of San Pedro is a 15th–17th century church built on the site of a 14th-century Al-Andalusian fortress or watchtower. Different styles: Gothic, Renaissance and Baroque, can be observed in its tower and facade.
- Iglesia de San Agustín, founded in 1539 as Convento de San Juan de Letrán. It was subsequently occupied by the convent the Order of St. Augustine of the Observance. With the Confiscation the last Augustinians were expelled and the convent was abandoned. Today, the church remains.
- Iglesia de San Miguel, formerly a Moorish fortress, in the 15th century was converted into a hermitage, and was rebuilt in the 18th century. It was also a hospice for orphaned girls. Currently it is used for exhibitions and lectures.
- Iglesia de San Francisco (church built between the 16th and 17th centuries)
- Convento de la Encarnación, a convent founded in the first half of the 16th century. Its main portal is Plateresque and the adjacent one is of late-Gothic style. Currently it is a parish hall.
- Capilla de la Misericordia, a chapel founded in 1490 to house the abandoned children, and to serve as a house and hospital for women. Its facade is Gothic. It is now a conference and exhibition hall.
- Convento de las Mercedarias Descalzas, the only remaining cloistered convent in Arcos, dating from 1642. Its nuns make sweets sold there and in some candy shops in Arcos. Formerly the nuns mended every type of clothing, except men's pants.
- Hospital de San Juan de Dios, a 16th-century hospital, formerly called Hospital de San Sebastián, attached to a hermitage. There were at that time 14 charitable hospitals in Arcos, and reunified in 1596 in San Sebastián.
- Palacio de los Condes del Águila, a 15th-century late Gothic-Mudéjar palace.

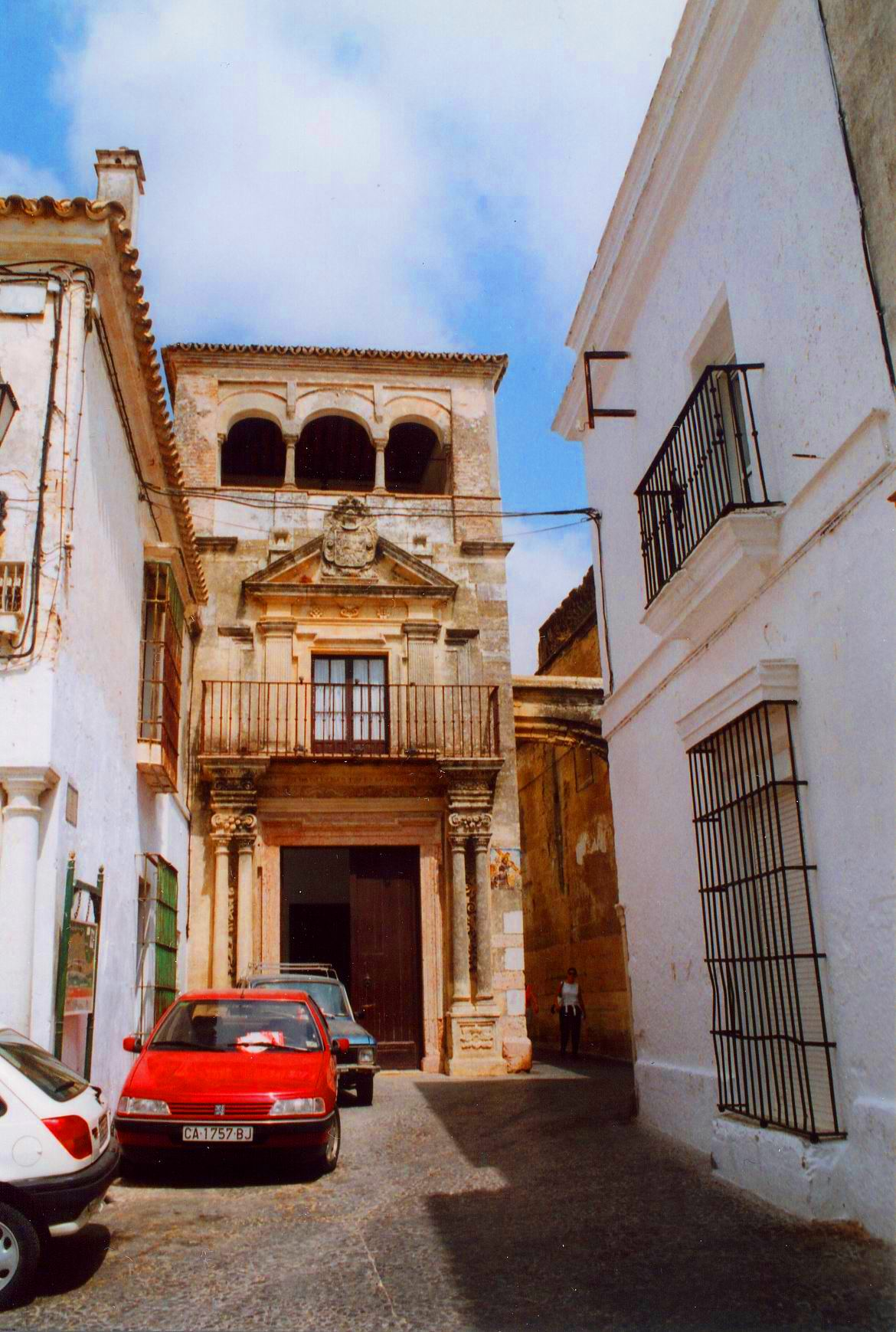
Palacio Mayorazgo

- Palacio del Mayorazgo, an Herrerian style house-palace built in the 17th century. It is now a municipal building.
- Asilo de la Caridad, late-16th century.
- Edificio del Pósito (granary building) with a stone facade of 1738; it was a wheat store in the 18th century, whence its takes its name. Years later it was a public school. Today it is a health center.
- Birth house of the poet Julio Mariscal, on whose facade can be seen a commemorative azulejo.
- Ayuntamiento viejo, (former City Hall), with a 17th-century stone portal. The City Council moved to the building that is in front to the castle due to stones falling from the promontory.
- The Historic center, declared a Historic-Artistic Monument in 1962.
- Remains of the Roman and Moorish City walls, although very ruined and largely demolished. This walled enclosure comprises only the upper neighborhood of the city. The remains of these walls, which can still be recognized on the ground itself, have a detailed description of by Miguel Mancheño y Olivares in his book "Apuntes para una historia de Arcos de la Frontera (chapt. V)". Of these walls, the part between the Torre de la Esquina and San Anton have little foundation remaining, and those of the City Gates Puerta de Jerez and Puerta de Carmona have completely disappeared. The city gate Puerta de Matrera is preserved, although modified.

=== Other places of interest ===
- Calle Nueva, a main street because it was the castle moat. With the 1755 Lisbon earthquake a stretch of wall collapsed, blocking the moat and giving rise to this street. It is decorated with pots, and the old small 'Bar Alcaraván' is located within a cave.
- The guardacantones, a common feature in streets of this town, is a reinforcement of street corners with old columns bearing capitals of many periods.
Some guardacantones

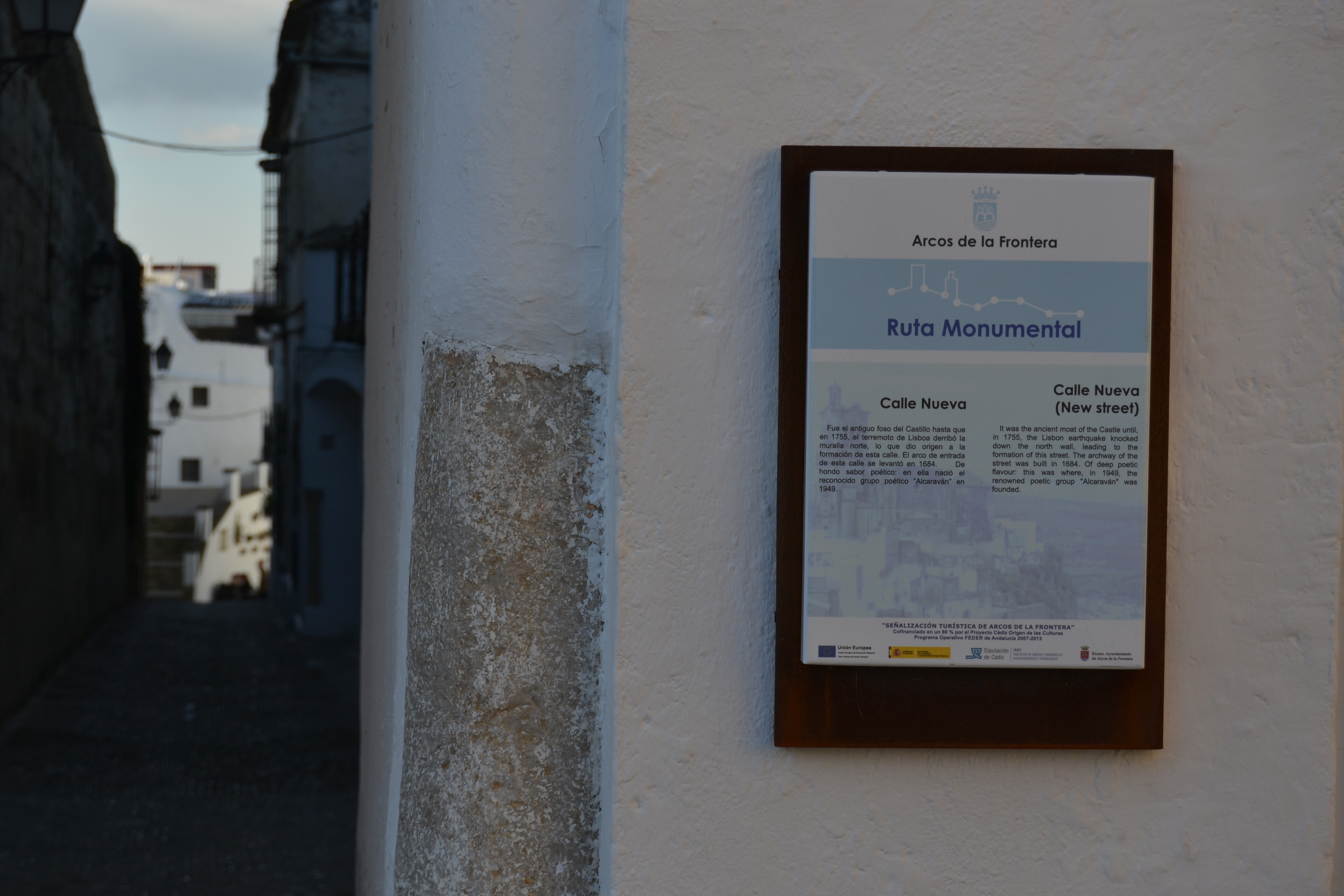
Calle Nueva

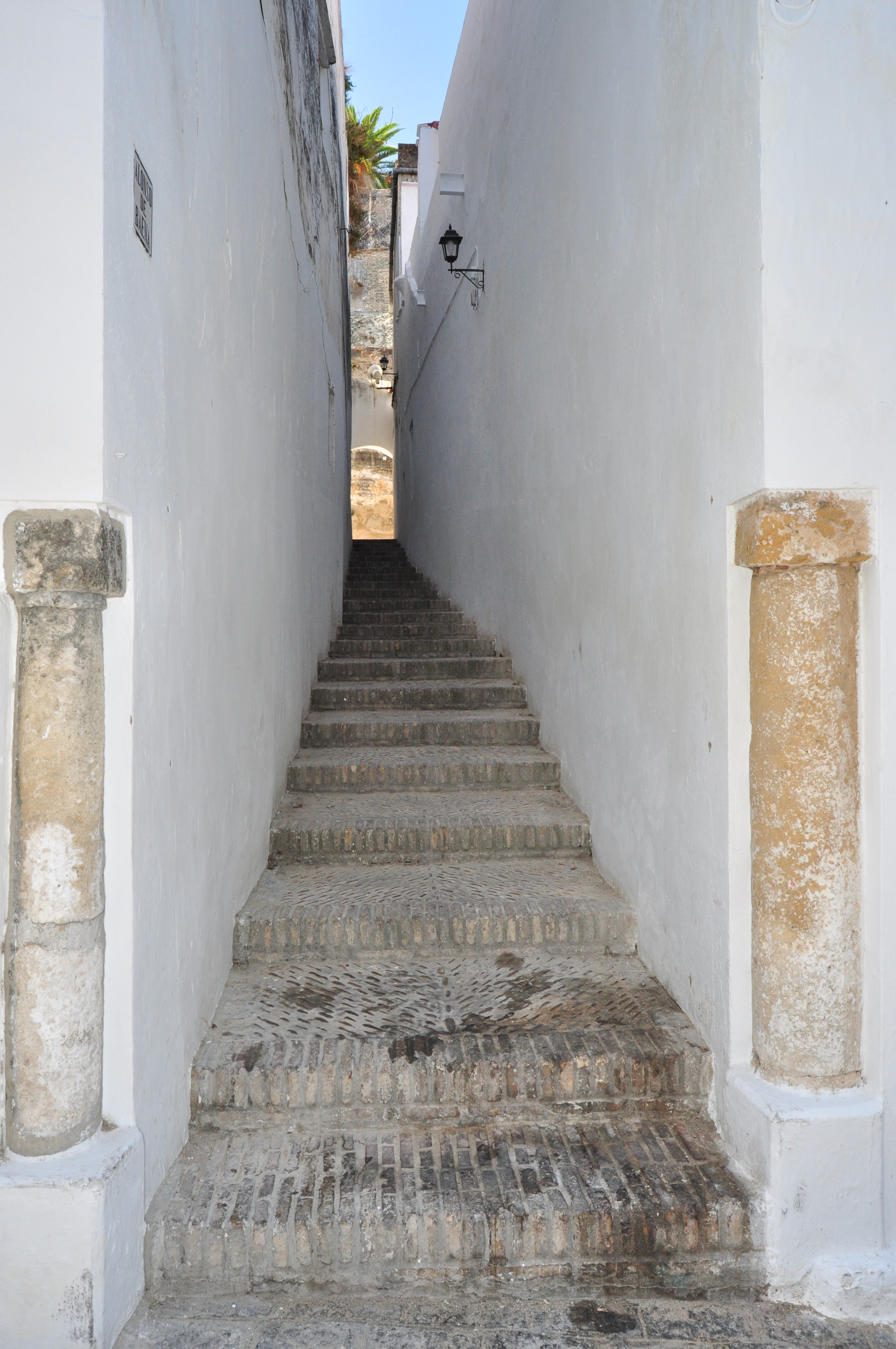
C. Alonso de Baena

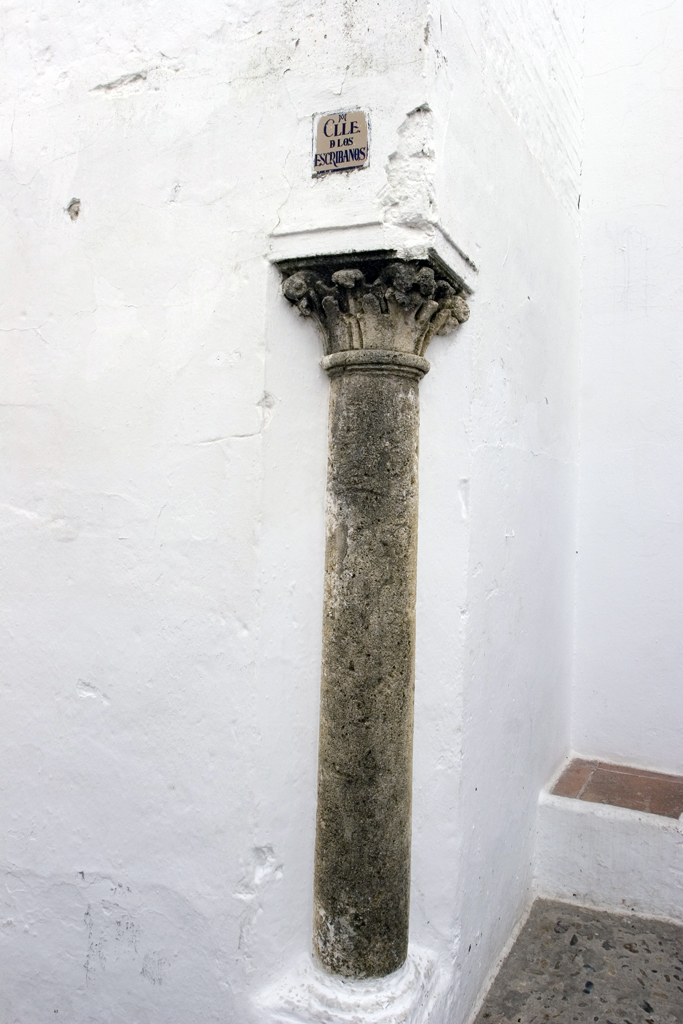
C. Los Escribanos
- A Roman altar, located in the alley Callejón de las Monjas.
- Alley Callejón de las Monjas. The flying buttresses crossing this alley were built in 1699, to hold the walls of the church that began to bend under the weight of the vaults. These buttresses join Santa María and the Convento de la Encarnación.
- Plaza del Cabildo, a main square: the north side is occupied by the lateral facade of Santa María, with its tower; the east side is occupied by the parador of Arcos, installed in the old Casa del Corregidor or mayor's house and inaugurated in 1966; the west side is occupied by the castle of Arcos (Castillo); the south side is the Mirador Plaza del Cabildo, a viewpoint overlooking the whole west, south and east area of countryside and orchards. A carpark occupies a large part of the square.
- Plaza Botica, a square where diners can eat outside. The Convento de las Mercedarias Descalzas and the Convento de los Jesuitas are located here.
- Convent of the Jesuits (Convento de los Jesuitas), whose building began in 1759 but was stopped a few years later because of their expulsion from Spain; thus it is unfinished. Currently it hosts a supply market.
- Calle Maldonado, one of the town's most painted streets by artists.
- Calle Cuna, a narrow street so named because it was the entrance to a shelter for foundling children. A reproduction of this street is located in the Poble Espanyol of Barcelona.
- Calle Bóvedas, another typical street of Arcos. Here the slopes are no longer upward and begin to descend the hill of the promontory.
- Typical sights in Arcos are the so-called ventanas con orejeras (windows with earmuffs), holes in the sides of the window, in various styles, to observe from inside what happens outside.
- Plaza de Toros de Arcos de la Frontera, a bullring.
- The Tourist Office (Oficina de Turismo), found within the Interpretation Center of the City of Arcos (Centro de Interpretación de la Ciudad de Arcos), located in a typical old house.
- San Miguel Bridge (Arcos de la Frontera), over the Guadalete.
- Calduba, Roman ruins from the 2nd century in the Sierra of Aznar, including important vestigial structures for water management.

==== Cortijos, haciendas and mills ====
The cortijos are traditional big farmhouses. Most are old, and currently many serve as hotels. This list also includes haciendas and mills.

- Cortijo de San Rafael
- Cortijo de la Fuensanta
- Cortijo Casablanca
- Cortijo Casa Blanquilla
- Cortijo Albardén
- Cortijo del Rey
- Cortijo el Jadublón
- Cortijo Barranco
- Cortijo Faín
- Cortijo las Posadas
- Cortijo Nuevo or el Guijo
- Cortijo or Hacienda el Peral
- Cortijo Soto del Almirante
- Hacienda el Santiscal
- Hacienda de San Andrés Nuevo
- Molino del Bachiller Viejo, (mill)
- Molino Nuestra Señora de la Luz or Barrancos, (mill)
- Molino de San Antón, (mill)

=== Former monuments ===
In Cuesta of Belén, in the entrance to the historic center, was one of the three city gates in medieval times, called Puerta de Jerez, which was torn down in 1852. An architect built a replica on his own initiative. This is the only replica of old monuments in Arcos.

== Natural sites ==
- The cliffs, and the promontory called "la Peña".
- The Guadalete river
- Arcos Reservoir.
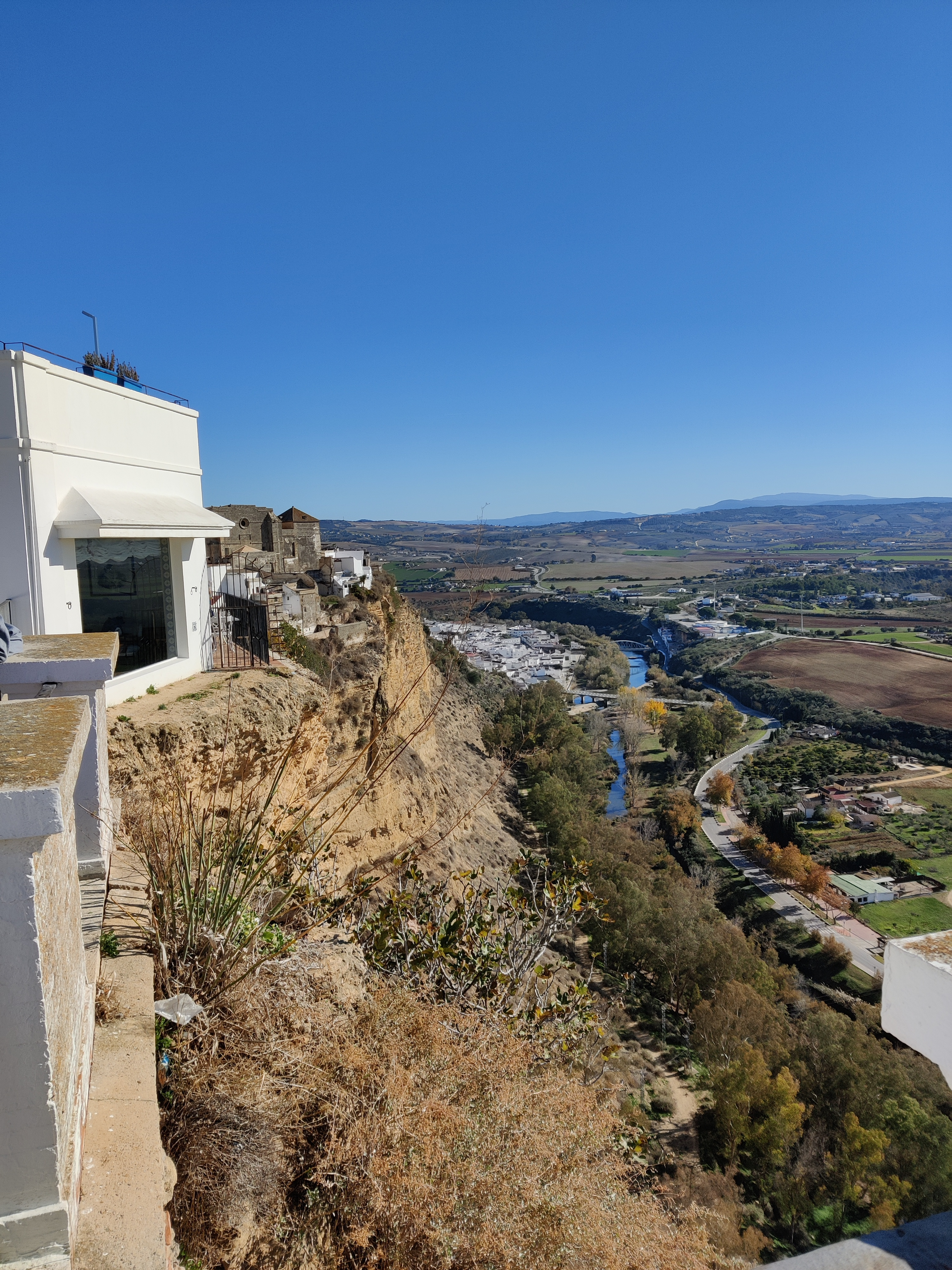
View SE from the mirador Plaza de Cabildo

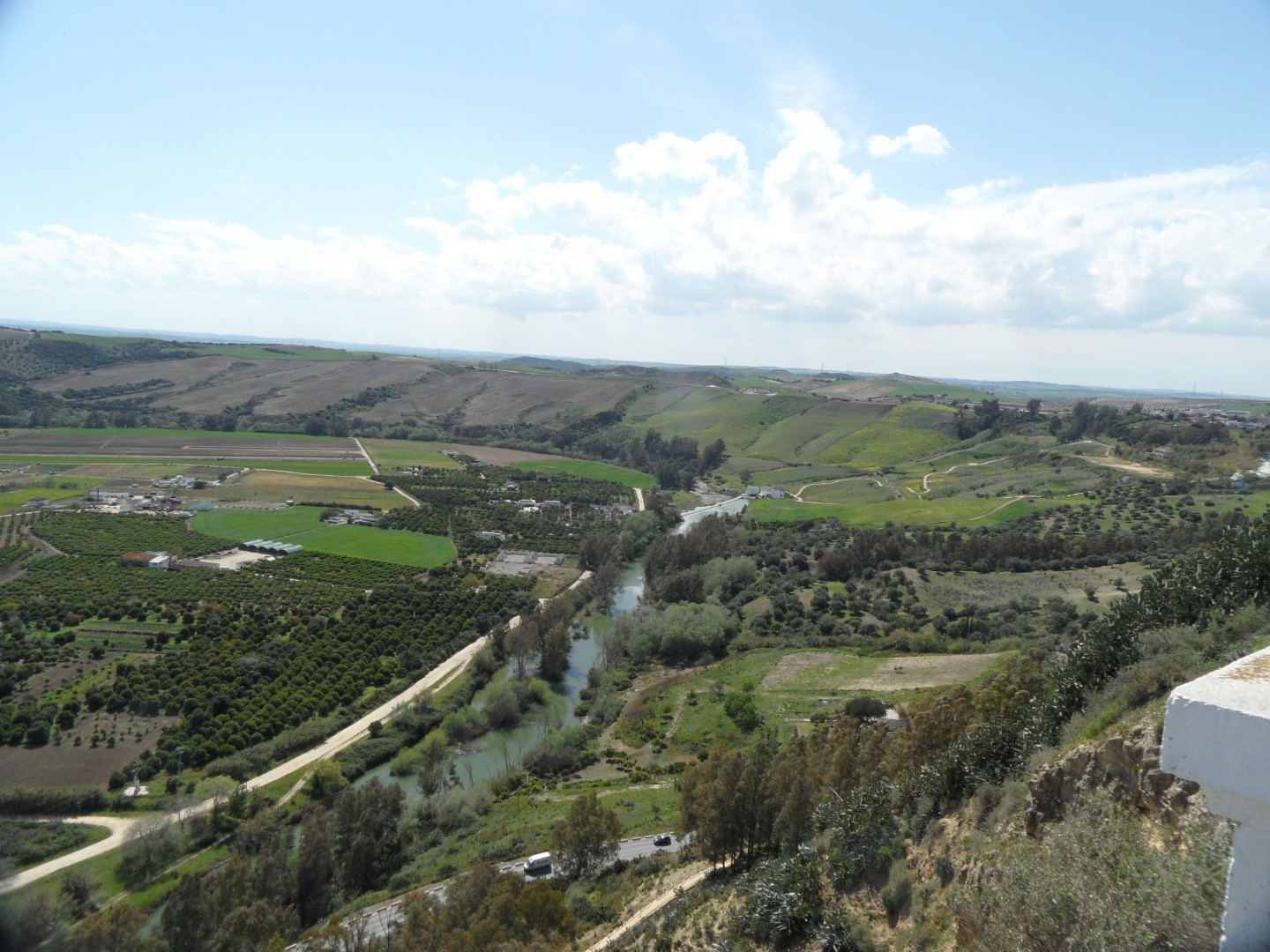
View SW from the mirador Plaza de Cabildo

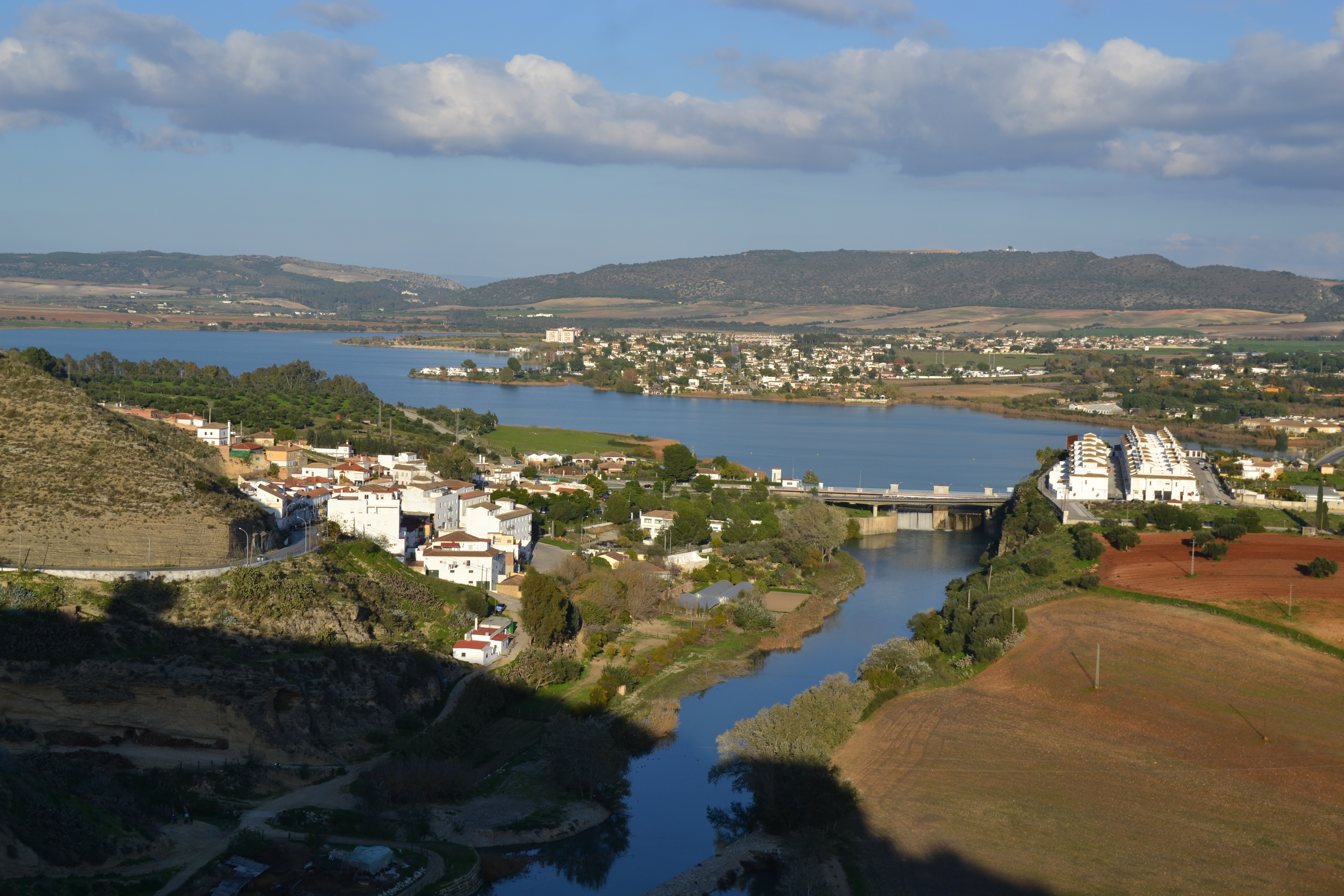
View N-E from Calle Peña Vieja: the Guadalete river coming out of the Arcos reservoir

== Gastronomy ==
- Native cuisine: Sausages. Ajo a la molinera. Sopa de Clausura. Gazpacho serrano. Sopa de espárragos. Sopa de tomate. Berza (chickpea stew). Garbanzos con tomillo. Revueltos de espárragos, Alboronía, Abajao, Poleá. Dishes cooked with game meat, pork and lamb.
- Sweets: Bollos de Semana Santa. Pestiños. Empanadillas. Compota regada con miel serrana. Also sweets made by nuns of Convento de las Mercedarias Descalzas.

== Fiestas ==
- Festividad de Nuestra Señora de las Nieves (Feast of Our Lady of the Snows -town's Patron Saint-)
- Semana Santa de Arcos (Holy Week of Arcos), declared a National Tourist Interest, every April.
- Toro del Aleluya (Bull of the Hallelujah), a running of the bulls based. Every Easter Sunday. First held in 1784.
- Zambombas of Arcos, declared of Intangible Cultural interest (Bien de Interés Cultural).
- Día del Caballo (Day of the Horse)
- Carnaval de Arcos (Carnival of Arcos), every second week of February.
- Cruz de Mayo (May Cross), in 2016 was held on April 30 and May 1.
- Velada del Barrio Bajo (Night fair of the Bajo neighbourhood), every May.
- Feria y Fiestas de San Miguel Patrón de Arcos (Fair and Festivals of Archangel Saint Michael Patron of Arcos)
- Belén Viviente (Living Bethlehem), declared of Tourist Interest of Andalusia.
- Romería del Santísimo Cristo del Romeral (Pilgrimage of the Holy Christ of El Romeral), every September.

== Villages and neighbourhoods within the municipality ==
- La Perdiz
- Los Barrancos
- El Santiscal
- Concejo
- El Drago
- Descansadero del Drago
- La Pedrosa
- Fuensanta
- La Garrapata
- Jadramil
- El Güijo
- Junta de los Ríos
- La Misericordia
- Jédula
- La Sierpe
- Las Abiertas
- Toronjil
- El Yugo
- Pequeña Holanda
- Vallejas

== See also ==
- List of municipalities in Cádiz

== Bibliography ==
- Chisholm, Hugh, ed. (1911). "Arcos de la Frontera" . Encyclopædia Britannica. Vol. 2 (11th ed.). Cambridge University Press. p. 446.
- Mancheño y Olivares, Miguel (1892). Galeria de Arcobricenses illustres (in Spanish). Arcos.
- Mancheño y Olivares, Miguel (1898). Riqueza y cultura de Arcos de la Frontera (in Spanish). Arcos: Imprenta de El Arcobricense. ISBN 9781241354701.
- Mancheño y Olivares, Miguel; Richarte García, Maria José (2003). Obra selecta de Miguel Mancheño y Olivares (PDF). Vol. 2. Apuntes para una historia de Arcos de la Frontera. (s. XIX) Antigüedades del Partido Judicial de Arcos e la Frontera y pueblos que existieron con él. Riqueza y cultura de Arcos de la Frontera.
