= Las Abiertas =

Hamlet in Spain

Coordinates: 36°41′N 6°06′W

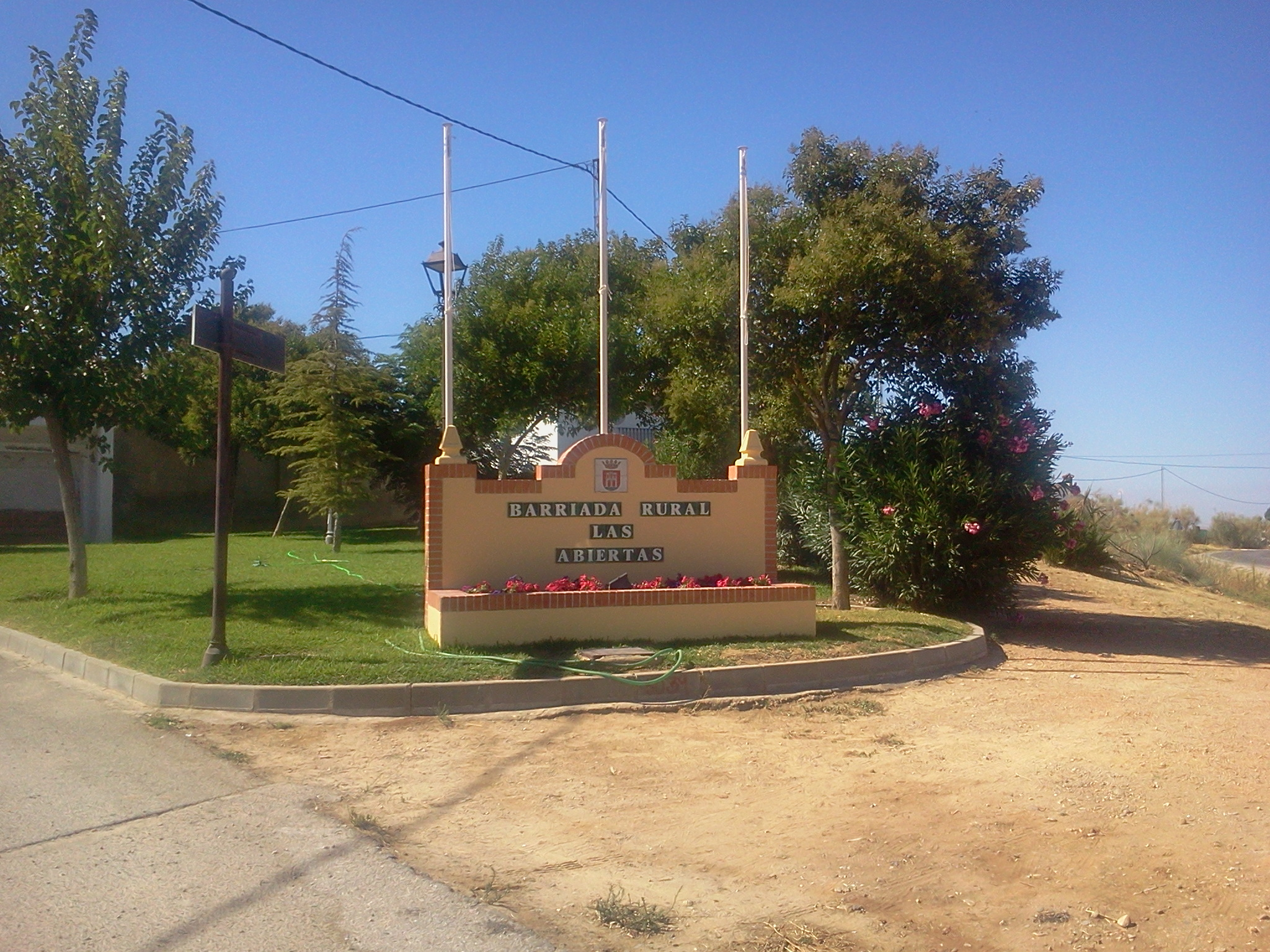

Las Abiertas is one of the districts of the municipality of Arcos de la Frontera (Cádiz, Spain). The hamlet is located 12 km from Arcos de la Frontera and has a population of 208.

== Services ==
The hamlet has a social venue where cultural activities take place and a public school kindergarten (Julio Mariscal Poet).
