= Castle of Arcos de la Frontera =

- Castillo de Arcos de la Frontera (Spanish)
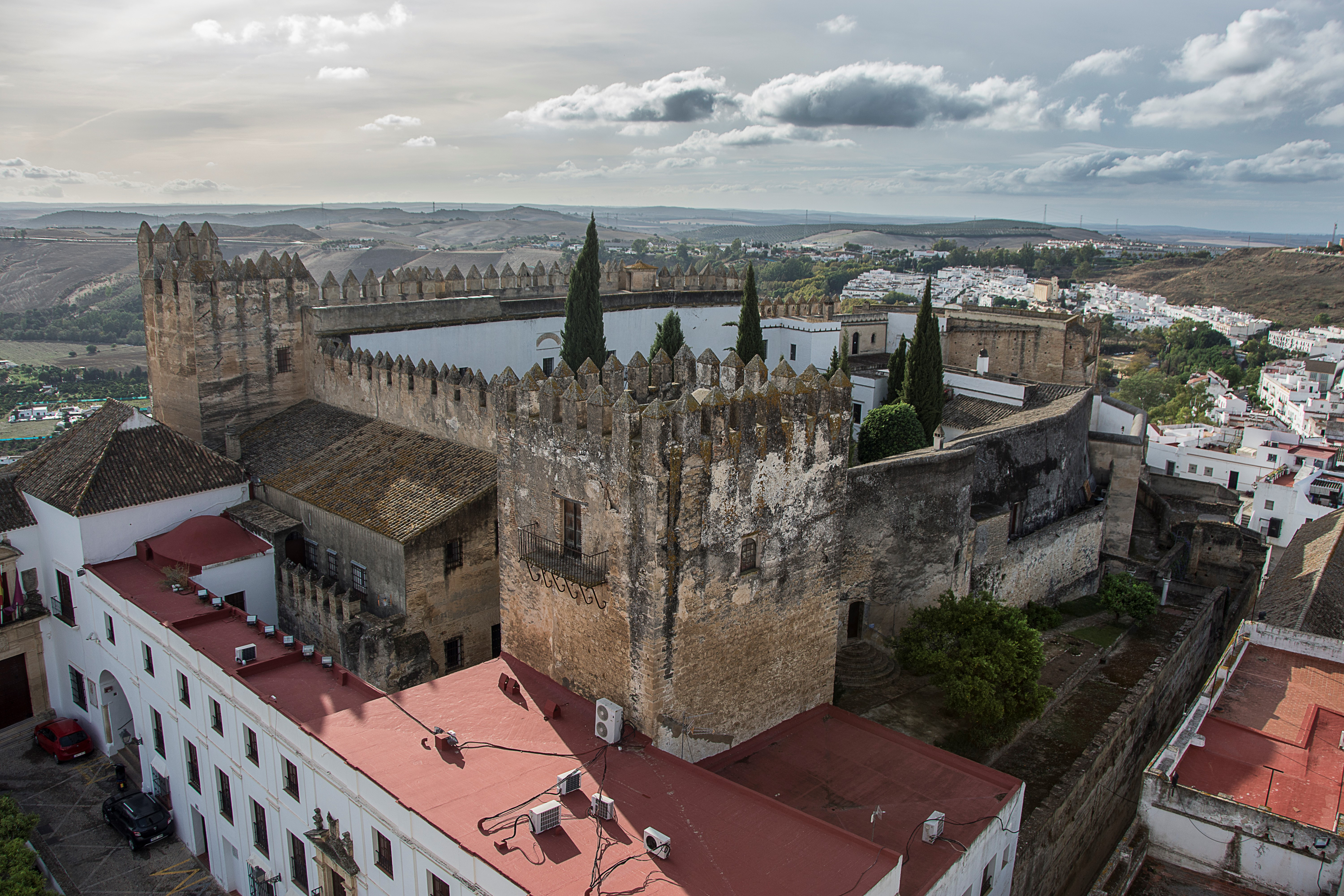

- Location within Spain
- 36.747274°N 5.804372°W
- Location: Arcos de la Frontera, Spain

Spanish Cultural Heritage
- Official name: Castillo de Arcos de la Frontera
- Type: Non-movable
- Criteria: Monument
- Designated: 1993
- Reference no.: RI-51-0008793

El Castillo de Arcos de la frontera (Spanish: Castillo de Arcos de la Frontera) is a castle located in Arcos de la Frontera, Spain. It was declared Bien de Interés Cultural in 1993.

== See also ==
- Dingwall-Williams, Luis de Mora-Figueroa y (1982). "Caña de lombardeta del siglo XV en el castillo de Arcos de la Frontera (Cádiz)". Estudios de historia y de arqueología medievales (1): 141–147.
