= Walls of Arcos de la Frontera =

- Murallas de Arcos de la Frontera (Spanish)
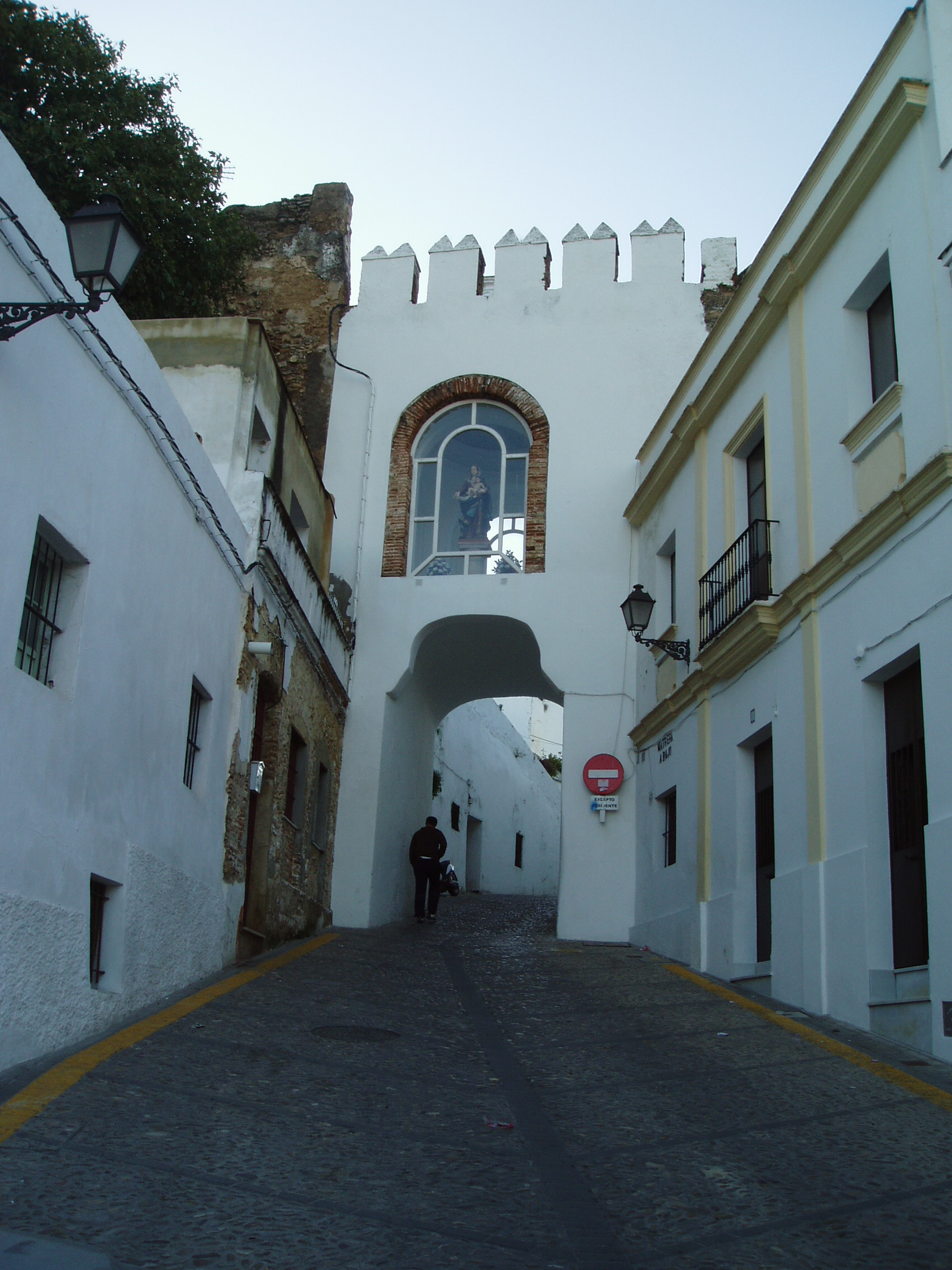
- City gate Puerta de Matrera

- Location within Spain
- 36.744789°N 5.799599°W
- Location: Arcos de la Frontera, Spain

Spanish Cultural Heritage
- Official name: Murallas de Arcos de la Frontera
- Type: Non-movable
- Criteria: Monument
- Designated: 1993
- Reference no.: RI-51-0007553

The Walls of Arcos de la Frontera (Spanish: Murallas) are walls located in Arcos de la Frontera, Spain. It was declared Bien de Interés Cultural in 1993.
