= Basílica de Santa María de la Asunción, Arcos de la Frontera =

Basílica de Santa María de la Asunción
- Iglesia Parroquial de Santa María (Spanish)
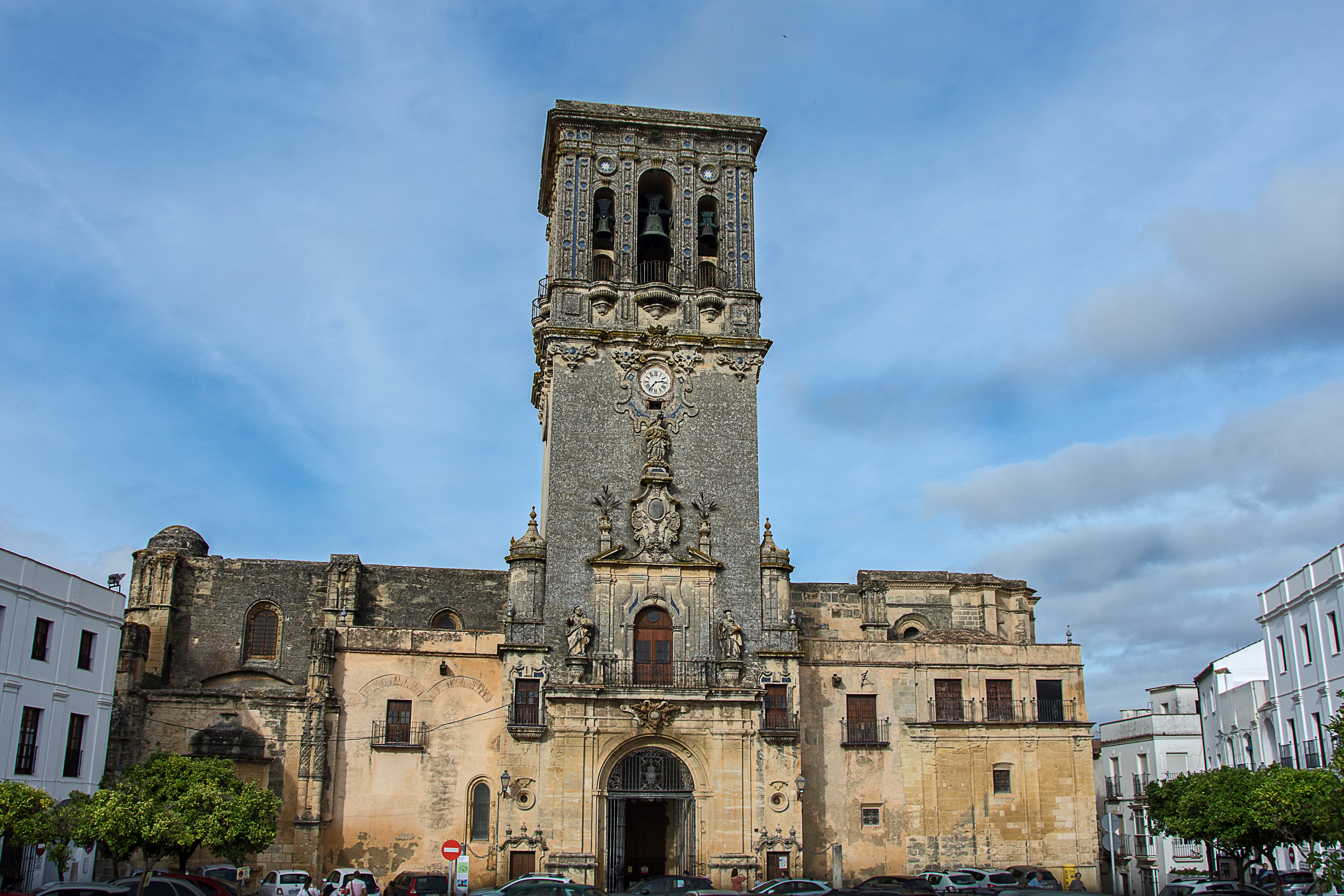
- Interactive map of Basílica de Santa María de la Asunción
- Location: Arcos de la Frontera, Spain

Spanish Cultural Heritage
- Official name: Iglesia Parroquial de Santa María
- Type: Non-movable
- Criteria: Monument
- Designated: 1931
- Reference no.: RI-51-0000504

The Basílica de Santa María de la Asunción is a church in Arcos de la Frontera, Andalusia, in southern Spain. It was built in the 15th-16th century. It was declared Bien de Interés Cultural in 1931.

History of this church site dates back to the 8th and 9th centuries. It was built on the remains of a former Moorish mosque. The main facade is in Gothic-Plateresque architectural style with the neoclassical tower being the newest addition.

== See also ==
- List of Bien de Interés Cultural in the Province of Cádiz
- List of former mosques in Spain
