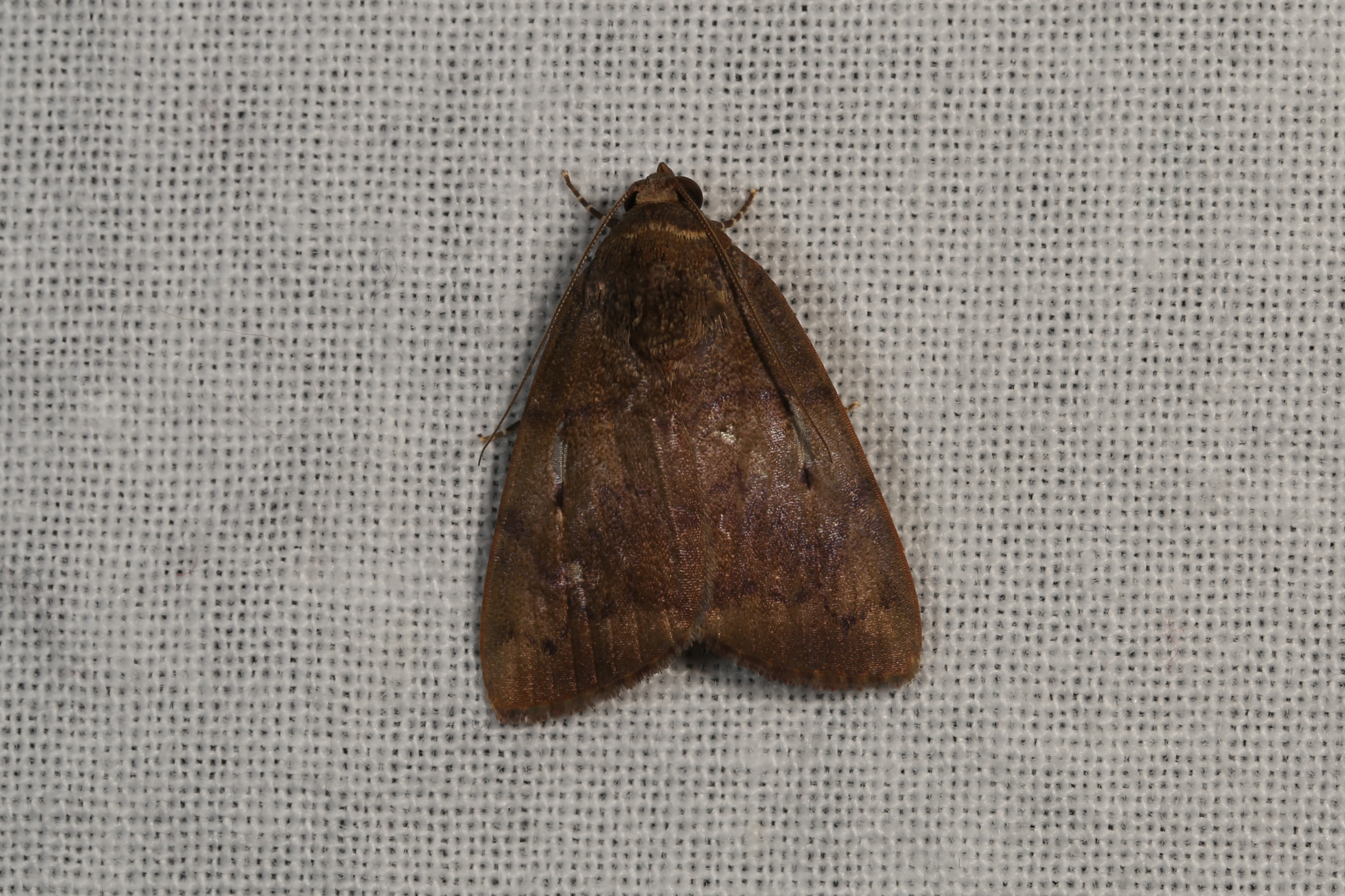

Scientific classification
- Kingdom: Animalia
- Phylum: Arthropoda
- Class: Insecta
- Order: Lepidoptera
- Superfamily: Noctuoidea
- Family: Nolidae
- Genus: Maceda
- Species: M. mansueta

Binomial name
- Maceda mansueta (Walker, 1857)

Synonyms
- Maceda mansueta Walker, 1857 [1858]; Calduba obtenta Walker, 1858; Maceda rufescens Bethune-Baker, 1906; Maceda mansuetta ab. mansuetana Strand, 1917; Maceda mansuetta ab. mansuetella Strand, 1917; Maceda mansuetta ab. mansuetodes Strand, 1917; Maceda mansueta mansuetana Gaede, mansuetella Gaede and mansuetodes Gaede, 1938; Maceda mansueta rufimacula Prout, 1921; Maceda mansueta Walker Kobes, 1997

= Maceda mansueta =

Species of moth

Maceda mansueta is a moth of the family Nolidae first described by Francis Walker in 1857. It is found in Japan, Sri Lanka, Borneo, India (Andamans), Malaysia, New Guinea, Fiji, Australia, Réunion and the Seychelles.

== Description ==
There are highly variable color patterns in the wings. Adults are brownish with transverse fasciation. Hindwings with gray and black shading. The caterpillar is yellowish with dark reddish dots in tubercles. There is a distinct double dorsal line on the caterpillar with red, brown or black speckles. Only primary setae present. Pupation occurs in an ovoid truncated cocoon which is brown. No cremaster. Larval food plant is Heritiera.

A single subspecies is recorded - Maceda mansueta rufimacula Prout, 1921.

== Hostplant ==
This species is known to feed on Heritiera littoralis (Malvaceae).

== Gallery ==
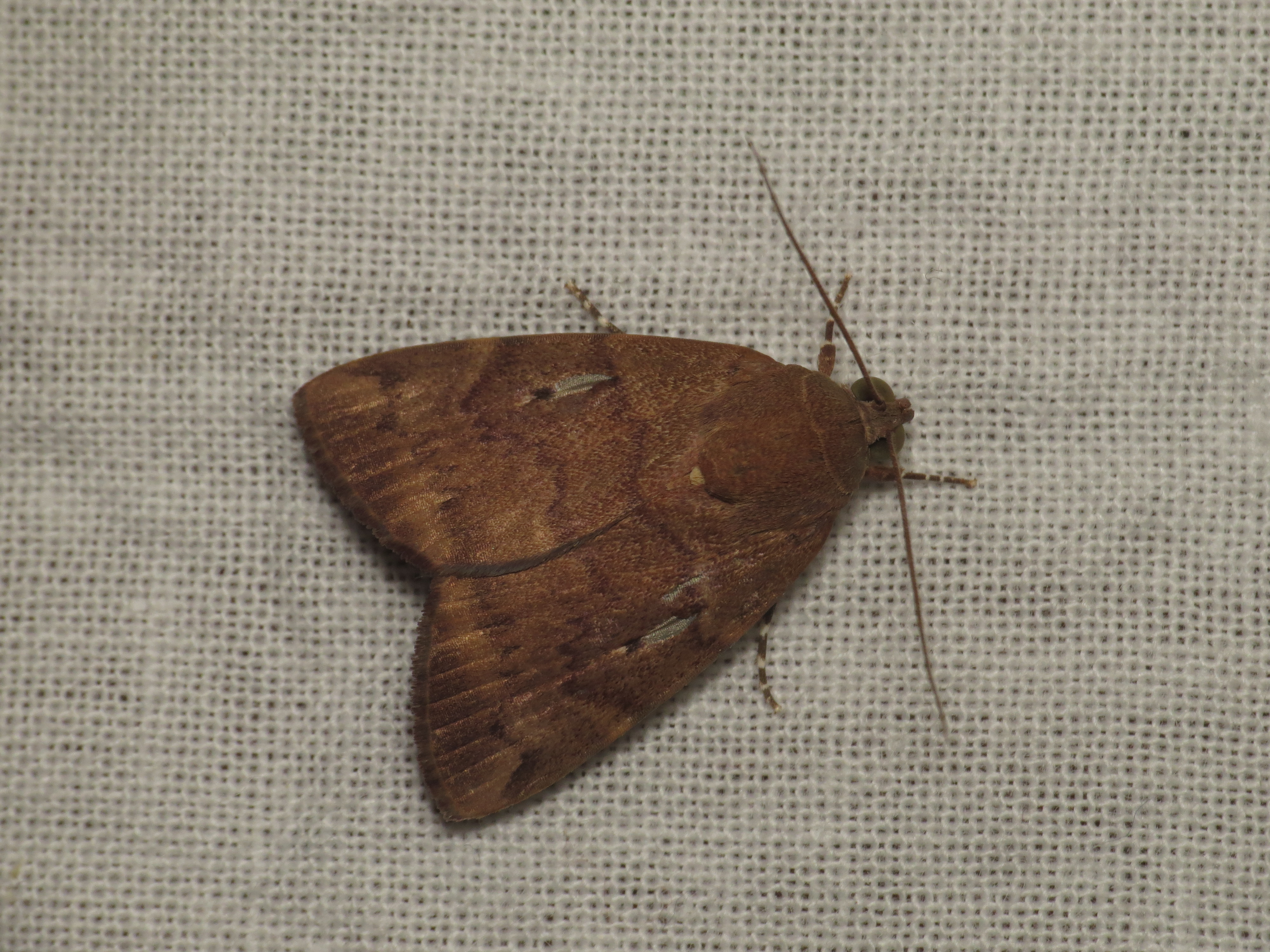

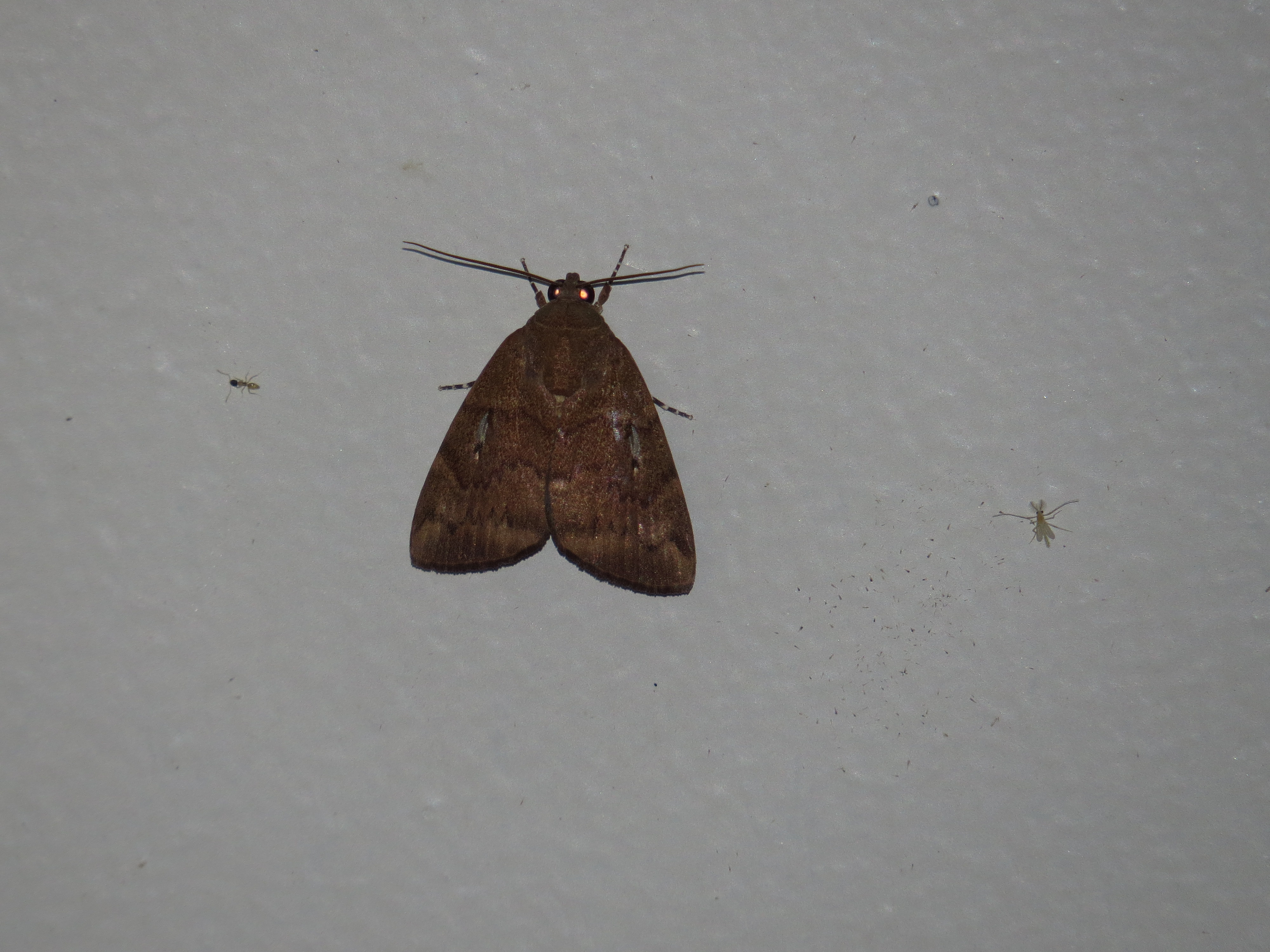

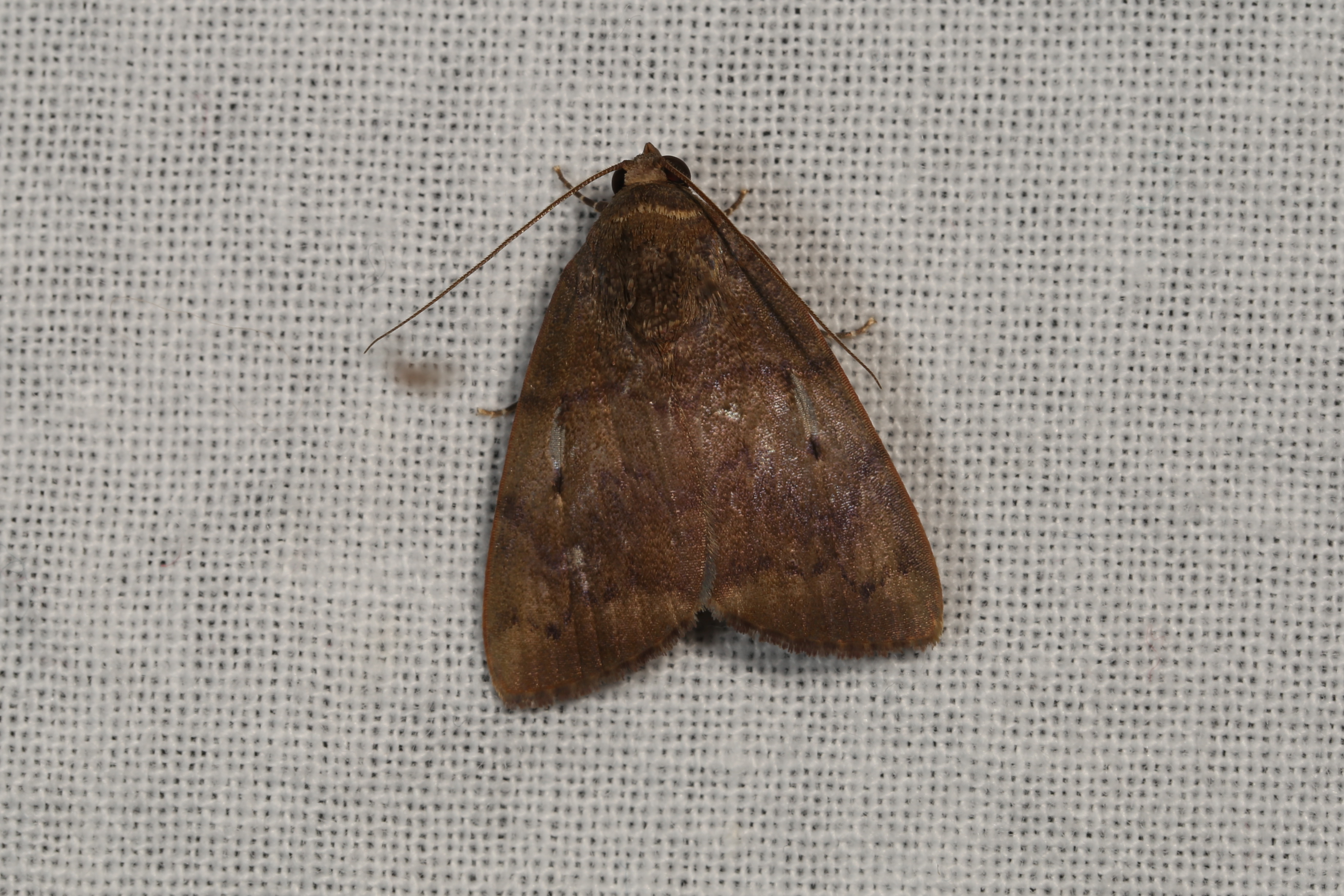
