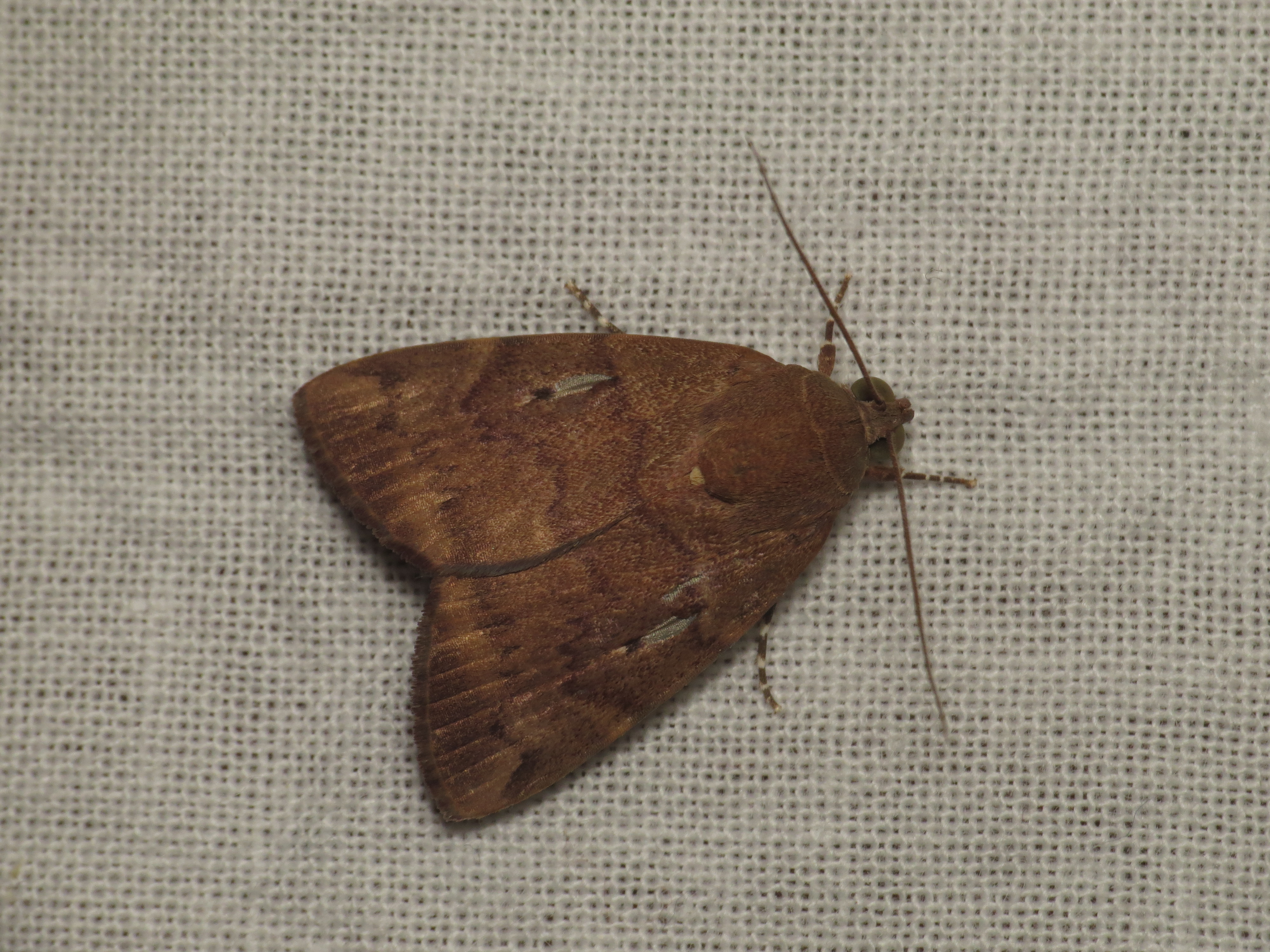
- Maceda mansueta

Scientific classification
- Kingdom: Animalia
- Phylum: Arthropoda
- Class: Insecta
- Order: Lepidoptera
- Superfamily: Noctuoidea
- Family: Nolidae
- Subfamily: Chloephorinae
- Genus: Maceda; Walker, 1857

Synonyms
- Calduba Walker, 1858

= Maceda (moth) =

Genus of moths

Maceda is a genus of moths of the family Nolidae first described by Francis Walker in 1857.

== Description ==
Palpi slender, and reaching just above vertex of head. Antennae ciliated. Abdomen with coarse hair on dorsum of proximal segments. Tibia nearly naked. Forewings tuftless. Apex almost rectangular. Male with bar-shaped retinaculum. The end of the cell rounded and dilated with a small patch of ribbed hyaline (glass-like) membrane, probably for stridulation with the spines of the mid-tarsi. Hindwings with stalked veins 3 and 4.

== Species ==
- Maceda mansueta Walker, 1858 (Australasia)
- Maceda ignefumosa Warren, 1912 (from New Guinea)
- Maceda rufibasis Warren, 1912 (from New Guinea)
- Maceda ignepicta Hampson, 1914
- Maceda savura Robinson, 1968 (from Fiji)
