= Cum hora undecima =

Papal bull

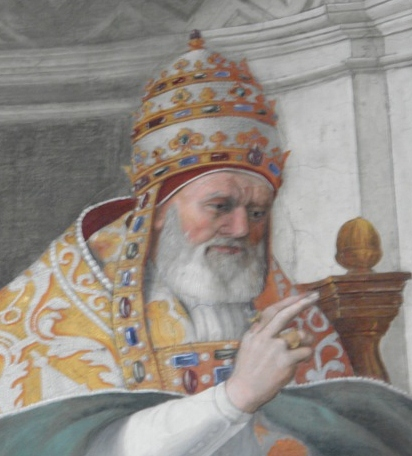
Pope Gregory IX

Cum hora undecima (Latin: Since it is the eleventh hour) is a papal bull issued by Pope Gregory IX in February 1235 and reissued and elaborated repeatedly during the thirteenth through fifteenth centuries. It contained basic instructions for missionaries and its opening lines reflected the apocalyptic tradition of the Franciscans:

Since the eleventh hour has come in the day given to mankind...it is necessary that spiritual men [possessing] purity of life and the gift of intelligence should go forth with John [the Baptist] again to all men and all peoples of every tongue and in every kingdom to prophesy because, according to the prophet Isaias, the salvation of the remnant of Israel will not occur until, as St. Paul says, the plenitudo gentium enters first [into the kingdom of heaven].

Missionaries were therefore urged to fulfil Jesus' command to preach the gospel to all men so that the process of salvation would be completed as the Book of Revelation described. They were also ordered to combat heresy and to reconvert non-believers. Gregory granted missionaries special privileges such as the right to hear confession anywhere and the right to absolve those who had been excommunicated.

Pope Innocent IV reissued the bull for the first time in March 1245. He added substantial detail and his version was the one reissued by later popes. One of his additions was to expand the list the places to which missionaries were to be sent, adding 18 nations to the Saracens and "pagans". These included Greeks, Bulgarians, Cumans, Georgians, Goths, Khazars, Circassians, Armenians, Nestorians, Alans, Indians, Rus', Ethiopians and Nubians. The Mongols were not included until 1253.
