= Sierra de Hornachuelos Natural Park =

Protected area in Cordova, Spain

Sierra de Hornachuelos
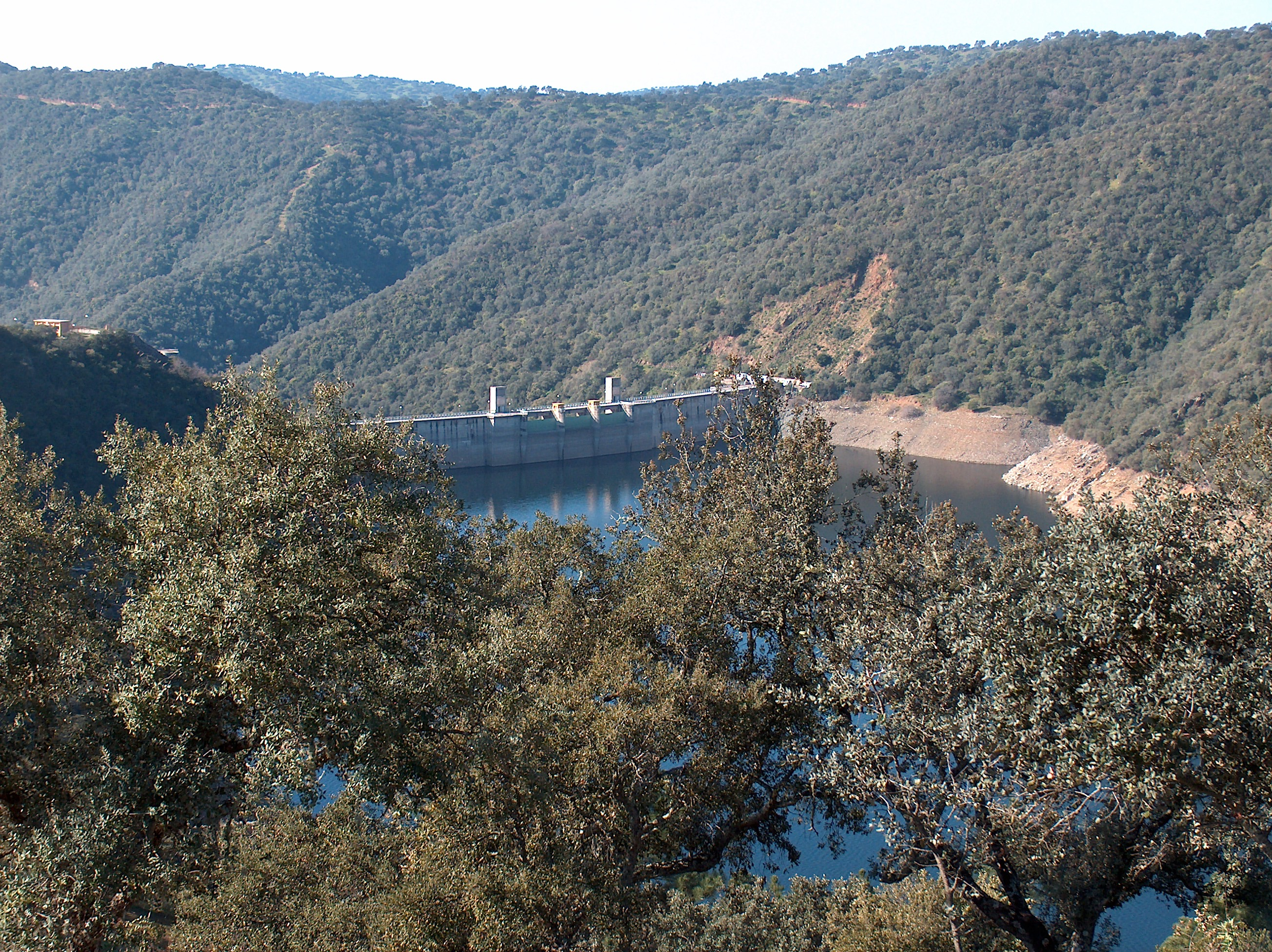
- Bembézar Reservoir

- Location within Spain
- Type: National Park
- Location: Córdoba
- Coordinates: 37°54′15″N 5°15′50″W
- Area: 60,032 ha
- Opened: 1989

The Sierra de Hornachuelos Natural Park is located to the west of the Province of Córdoba (bounded by the Sierra Norte de Sevilla Natural Park) and has 60,032 hectares between the municipal borders of Almodóvar del Río, Córdoba, Hornachuelos, Posadas and Villaviciosa de Córdoba. It was declared a natural park on 28 July 1989.

== Description ==
This park hosts one of the Mediterranean forest ecosystems and one of the best conserved riverbanks of Sierra Morena. It is designated a Special Area of Conservation (ZEC). Together with the Sierra Norte de Sevilla Natural Park, and the Sierra de Aracena and Picos de Aroche Natural Park, it belongs to the Dehesas de Sierra Morena Biosphere Reserve.

This natural space contains a biodiverse population. Its most abundant species is the evergreen oak, a type of mediterranean oak. In the riverbanks of the humid zones, there are cork oaks, Portuguese oaks, and olives, as well as Carob and Mediterranean dwarf palms. The forest near the riverbank is composed of poplars, and alders, willows, and ash trees, as well as hawthorn, ivy, and oleander. Among the aquatic species, there is water-crowfoot and duckweed.

The geography of the park is very diverse. It contains various rivers: the Bembézar, as well as its tributary Guadalora, the Retortillo, and the Guadiato. Dehesas, dense forests, narrow ravines, canyons, and mountains form the landscape.

The fauna is made of different populations of birds, such as the Eurasian griffon vulture, Cinereous vulture (of the major colonies of Andalusia), Golden eagle, Spanish imperial eagle, Bonelli's eagle, and Black stork. Among the terrestrial species there are otter, Egyptian mongoose, deer, wild boar, lynx, and wolf.

The park includes the cities of Hornachuelos, Pasadas, Almodovar del Rio, and Villaviciosa de Córdoba.
