= Villaviciosa =

Villaviciosa may refer to:

- Villaviciosa, Abra, a municipality in Abra province, Philippines
- Villaviciosa, Asturias, a municipality in the autonomous community of Asturias, Spain
- Villaviciosa de Córdoba, a municipality in the province of Córdoba, Spain
- Villaviciosa de Odón, a municipality in the autonomous community of Madrid, Spain
