= Quéntar Reservoir =

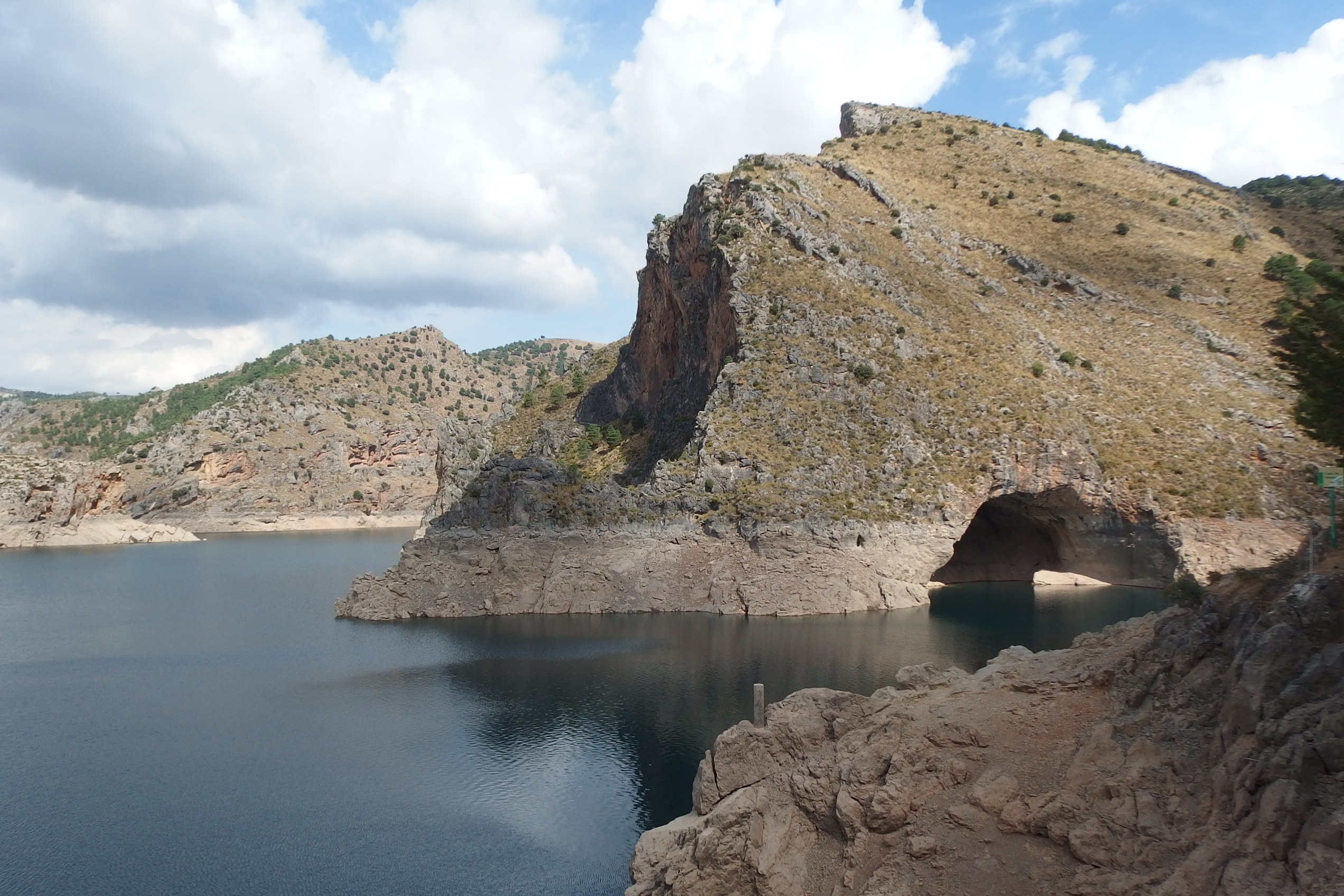

- Location within Andalusia
- Location: Quéntar
- Coordinates: 37°12′26″N 3°26′3″W
- Type: reservoir
- Primary inflows: Aguas Blancas River
- Basin countries: Spain
- Built: 1975

Quéntar Reservoir is a reservoir in Quéntar, province of Granada, Andalusia, Spain.

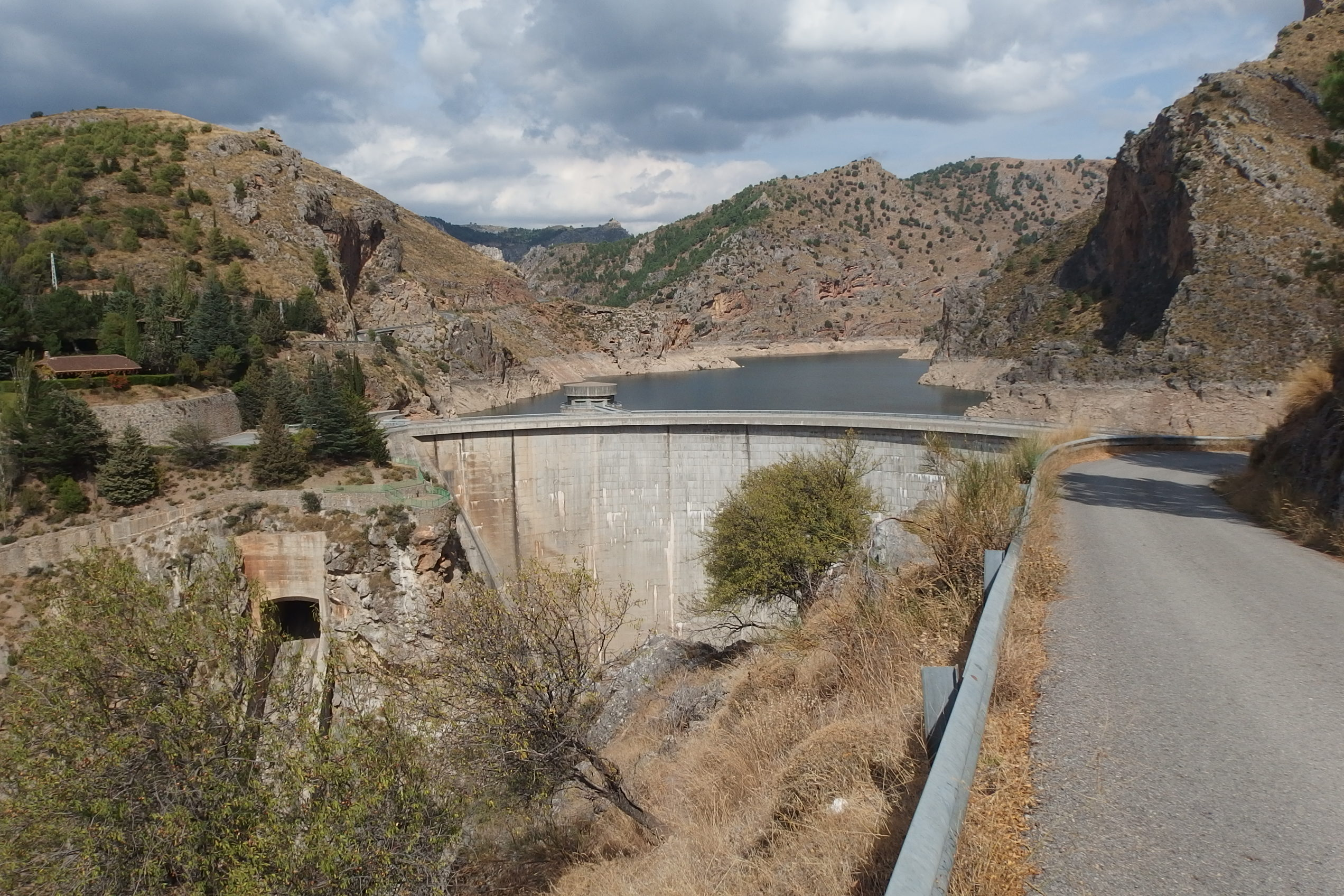

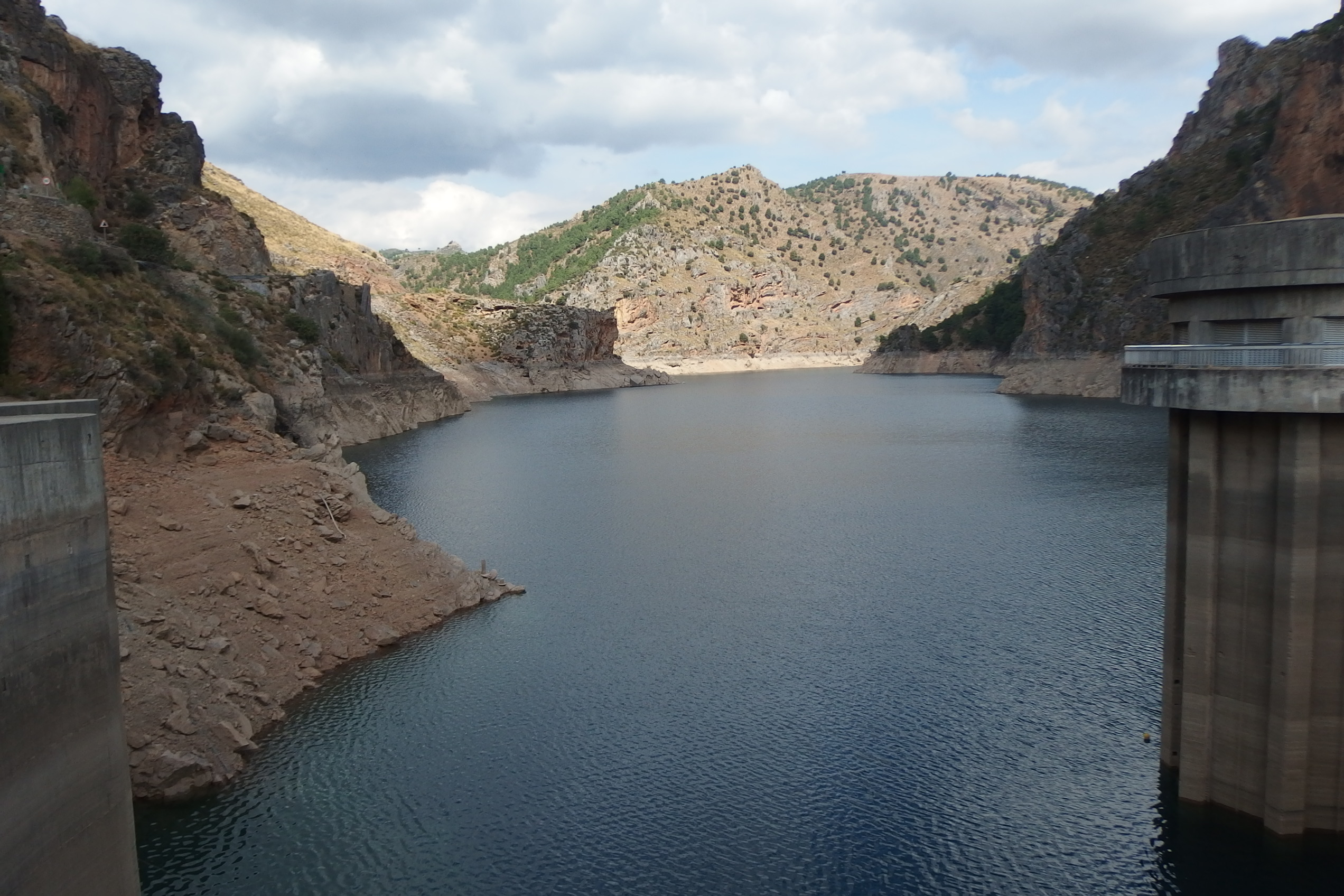

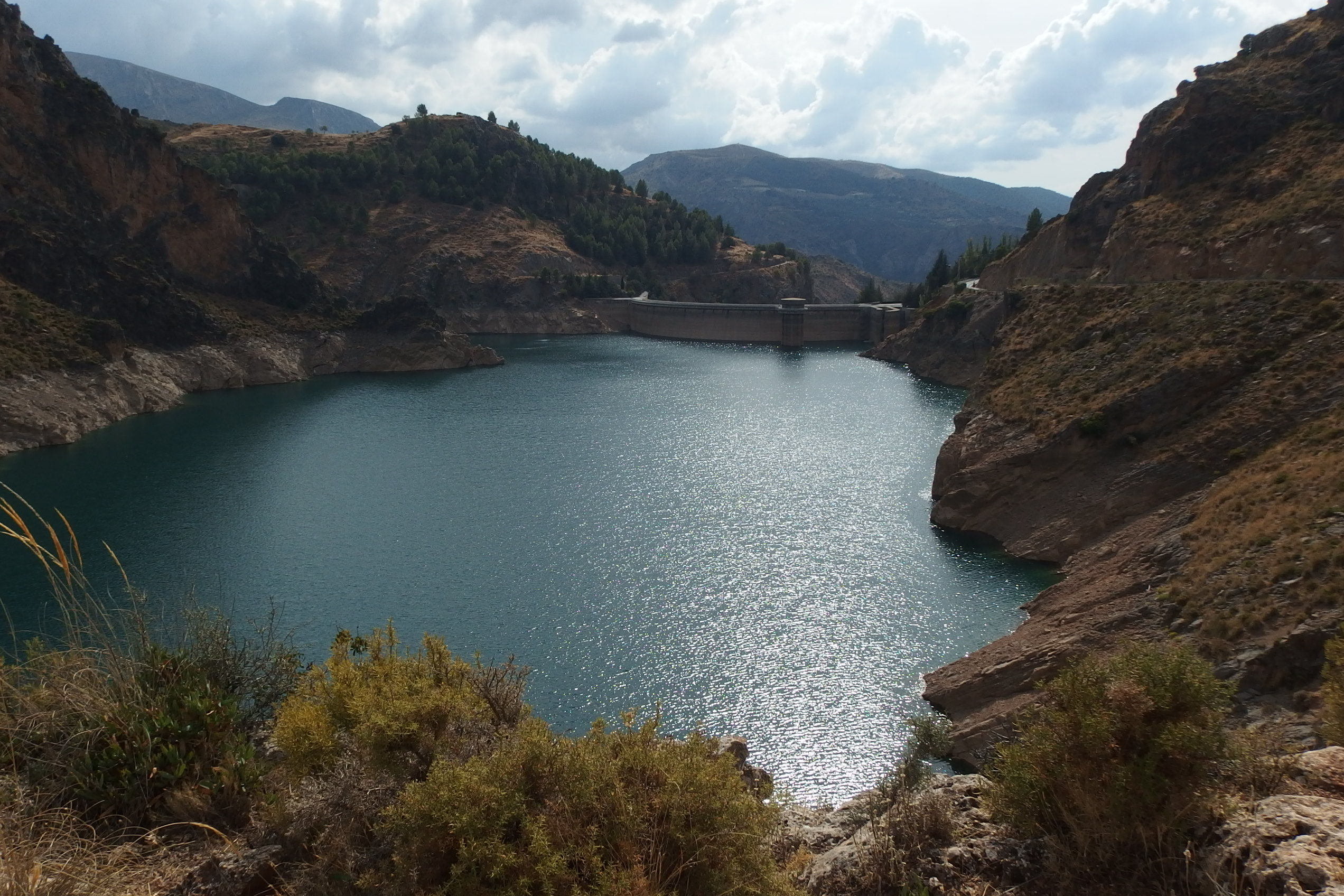

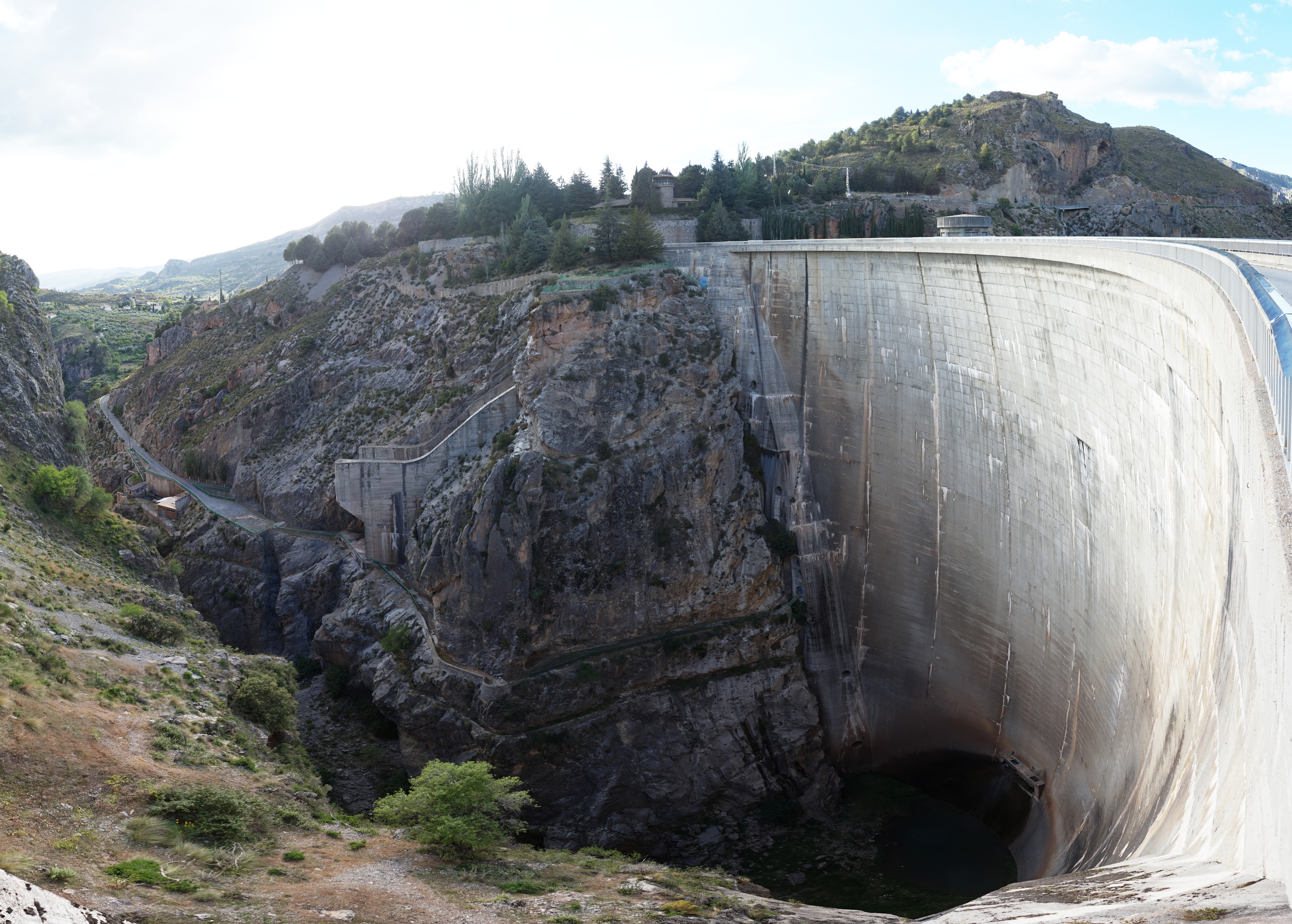

== See also ==
- List of reservoirs and dams in Andalusia
