= Guadalcacín =

Guadalcacín may refer to:

- Guadalcacín River or Majaceite, the main tributary of the river Guadalete in Andalusia, Spain
- Embalse de Guadalcacín, a reservoir in the province of Cádiz, Andalusia, Spain
- Guadalcacín (Jerez de la Frontera), a district in Jerez de la Frontera, Spain
