= Puente Nuevo Reservoir =

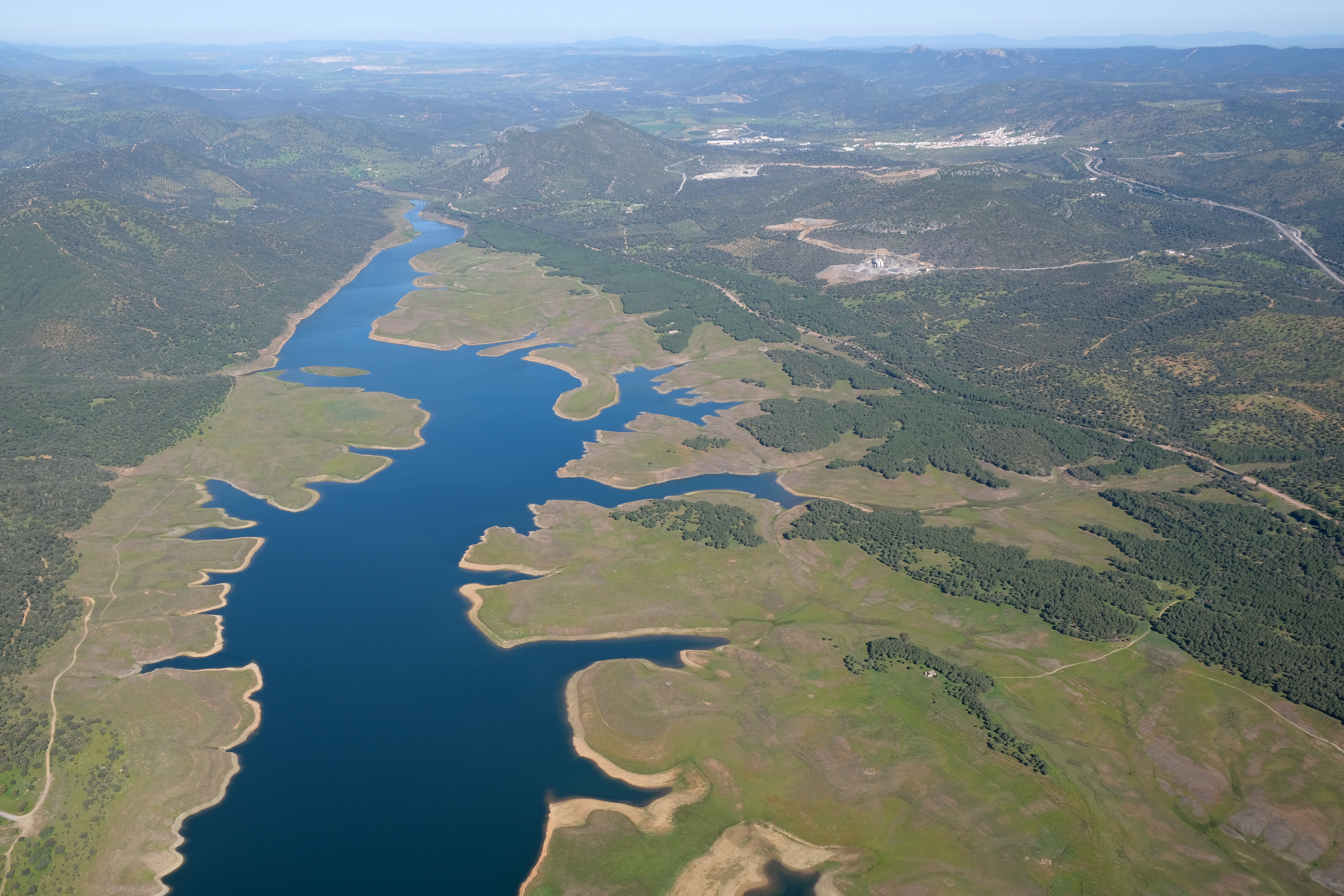

- Location within Andalusia
- Location: Villaviciosa de Córdoba
- Coordinates: 38°6′33″N 4°57′4″W
- Type: reservoir
- Primary inflows: Guadiato River
- Basin countries: Spain
- Built: 1972

Puente Nuevo Reservoir is a reservoir in Villaviciosa de Córdoba, Córdoba, Andalusia, Spain.

== See also ==
- List of reservoirs and dams in Andalusia
