= Guadanuño Reservoir =

- Location within Andalusia
- Location: Córdoba, Obejo, Villaviciosa de Córdoba
- Coordinates: 38°1′24″N 4°47′35″W
- Type: reservoir
- Primary inflows: Guadanuño River
- Basin countries: Spain
- Built: 1967

Guadanuño Reservoir is a reservoir in the province of Córdoba, Andalusia, Spain.

== See also ==
- List of reservoirs and dams in Andalusia
