= Iznájar =

- Municipality
- Concello de Iznájar
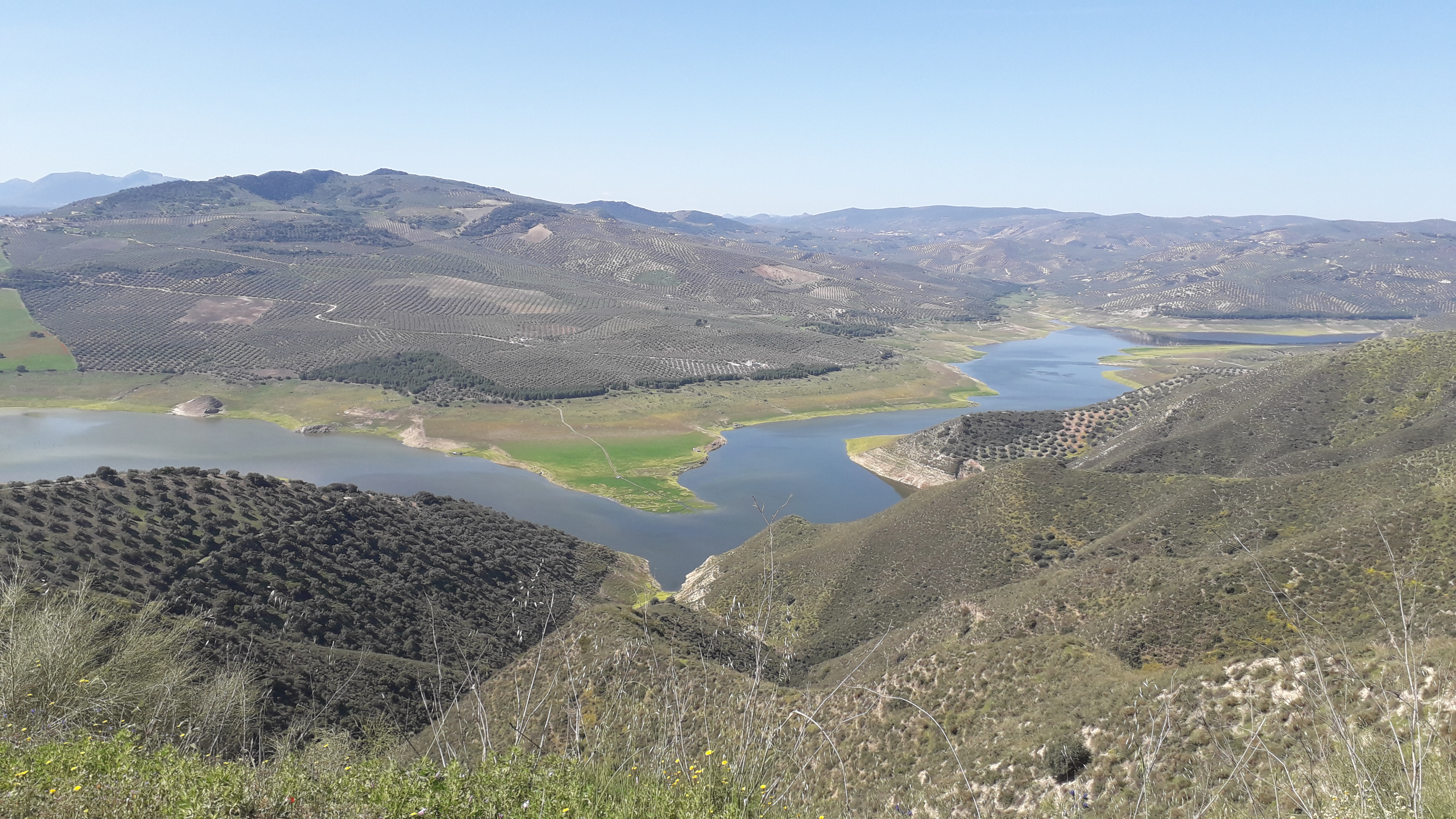
- Interactive map of Iznájar
- Country: Spain
- Autonomous community: Andalusia
- Province: Córdoba
- Comarca: Subbética

Area
  - Total: 136 km^{2} (53 sq mi)
- Elevation: 539 m (1,768 ft)

Population (2005)
  - Total: 4,960
  - Density: 36.5/km^{2} (94.5/sq mi)
- Demonym: Iznájarian
- Time zone: UTC+1 (CET)
  - Summer (DST): UTC+2 (CEST)

Iznájar is a town and municipal area in the province of Córdoba in Andalucia, southern Spain.

== Demographics ==
In 2005, it had a population of 4,960 inhabitants, with a population density of 36.5 people per km^{2}.

== Geography ==
The municipality covers an area of 136 km^{2}.

Located at 37°15′N 4°18′W, it lies on the Genil river approximately 110 km from the provincial capital of Córdoba and very close to the borders with both the Málaga and Granada provinces at a height of 539 metres above sea level.

The village itself is situated on top of a huge rocky outcropping overlooking the Iznajar Reservoir, the largest in Andalucía, which is frequented throughout the warm season as a beach.

Iznájar is a classic "pueblo blanco", or white village. It is surrounded by its "aldeas" - sub villages including La Celada, El Higueral, Solerche to name but three.

== Economy ==
The principal economic activity of the area is the cultivation of olives although tourism is increasingly becoming an economic factor.

== Culture ==
The whole of the area of Iznájar has a vibrant social life with many fiestas celebrated throughout the year - most notably Semana Santa (Easter), Los Reyes (Three Kings or Twelfth Night) and the Fiesta de la Virgen.

== See also ==
- List of municipalities in Córdoba
