= List of reservoirs in Andalusia =

This is a list of dams and reservoirs in Andalusia, Spain.

== Almería ==
Name	Location	Image
Benínar Reservoir		
Cuevas del Almanzora Reservoir		

== Cádiz ==
Name	Location	Image
Benínar Reservoir		
Embalse de Arcos		
Almodóvar Reservoir	,	
Barbate Reservoir	,	
Bornos Reservoir		
Celemín Reservoir	,	
Guadalcacín Reservoir		
Los Hurones Reservoir		
Embalse de Zahara-el Gastor	,	
Embalse de Charco Redondo	,	
Guadarranque Reservoir		

== Córdoba ==
Name	Location	Image
Arenós Reservoir		
Bembézar Reservoir		
Guadalmellato Reservoir		
Guadanuño Reservoir		
Iznájar Reservoir		
La Breña Reservoir		
Martín Gonzalo Reservoir		
Puente Nuevo Reservoir		
Retortillo Reservoir		
San Rafael de Navallana Reservoir		
Sierra Boyera Reservoir		
Embalse del Yeguas		

== Granada ==
Name	Location	Image
Canales Reservoir		
Colomera Reservoir		
Cubillas Reservoir		
El Portillo Reservoir		
Francisco Abellán Reservoir		
Los Bermejales Reservoir		
Negratín Reservoir		
Quéntar Reservoir		
San Clemente Reservoir		
Béznar Reservoir		
Rules reservoir		

== Huelva ==
- Embalse de Aracena
- Embalse de Zufre
- Embalse de Andévalo
- Embalse del Chanza
- Embalse de Corumbel Bajo
- Embalse de Jarrama
- Embalse de Los Machos
- Embalse de Piedras

== Jaén ==
- Embalse de Aguascebas
- Embalse de Dañador
- Embalse de Giribaile
- Embalse de Guadalén
- Embalse de Guadalmena
- Embalse de Jándula
- Embalse de La Bolera
- Embalse de La Fernandina
- Embalse de Quiebrajano
- Embalse de Rumblar
- Embalse de El Tranco de Beas
- Embalse de Vadomojón
- Embalse de Vívoras
- Embalse de las Anchuricas
- Embalse de la Novia o de la Vieja

== Málaga ==
- Embalse de El Limonero
- Embalse de Casasola
- Embalse de Guadalteba
- Embalse de Guadalhorce
- Embalse de La Concepción
- Embalse de La Viñuela

== Seville ==
- Embalse de Cala
- Embalse de El Agrio
- Embalse de El Pintado
- Embalse de Gergal
- Embalse de Huesna
- Embalse de José Torán
- Embalse de La Minilla
- Embalse de Puebla de Cazalla
- Embalse de Torre del Águila

== See also ==
- List of dams and reservoirs
- List of dams and reservoirs in Spain
