= Charca de Suárez =

Nature reserve in Spain

Coordinates: 36°43′27″N 3°32′32″W

The Charca de Suárez is a wetland in Motril, Spain. It is maintained as a nature reserve. Despite being small in area (13.78 ha), it is the most important wetland on the coast of the province of Granada.

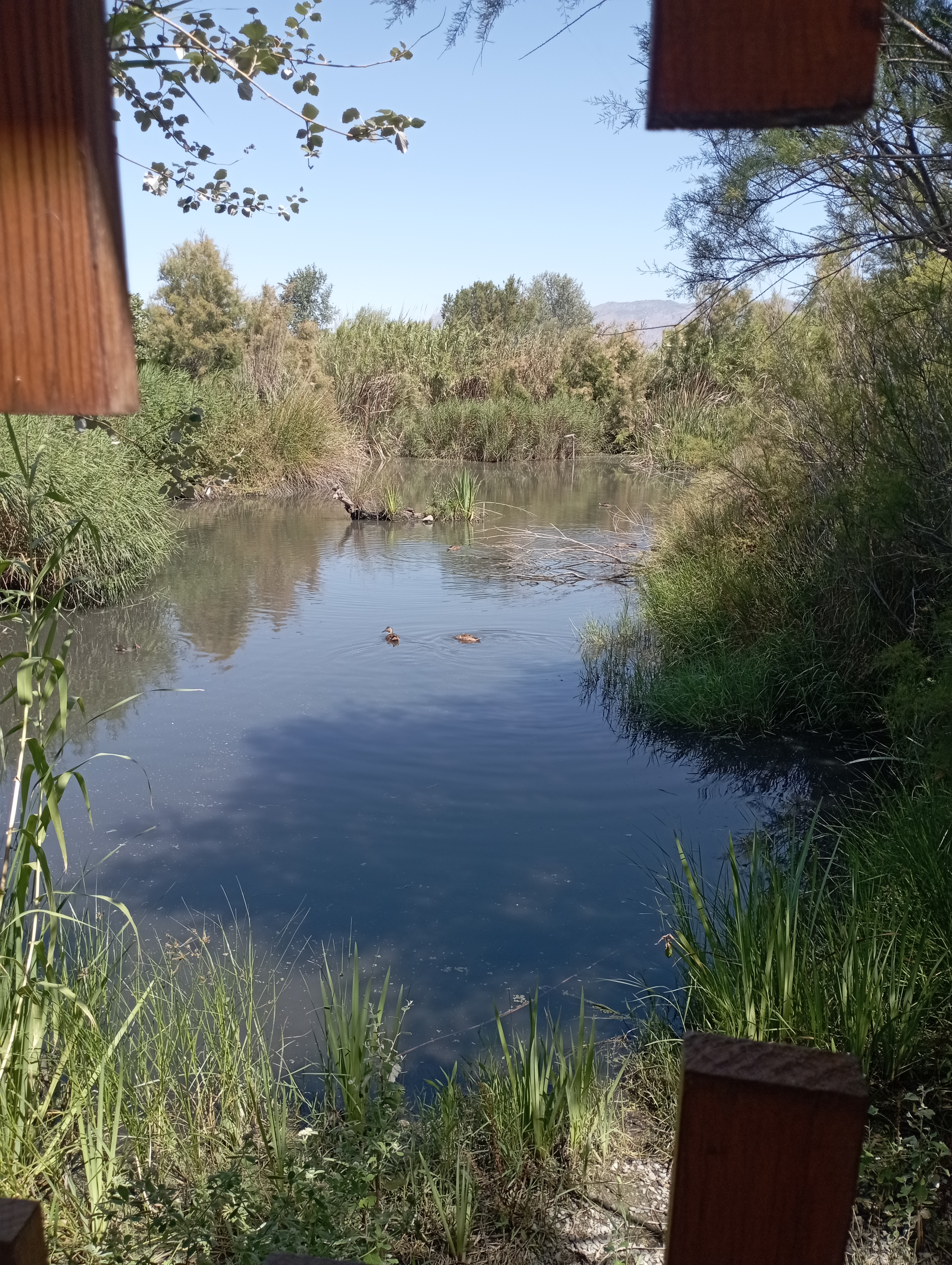

The wetland is part of the delta of the River Guadalfeo. Most of the delta has been drained, initially for agricultural use, including the cultivation of sugar cane (Saccharum officinarum). Although sugar cane is no longer grown commercially in Spain, there is some on the reserve. It is not an indigenous species, but it provides cover for wildlife.

== Ecology ==
=== Birdlife ===
The Charca attracts a number of bird species both for breeding and as a stop-off point for migratory birds.

Among the reserve's "top species" as listed at "birdingplaces" are Fulica cristata (the Red-knobbed coot), the Purple swamphen, Little bittern and the Eurasian stone-curlew.

In 2013 the reserve was one of the sites used by a rescue plan for the Red-knobbed coot. Birds from a captive breeding programme were released and in 2025 an exhibition was mounted at the reserve to celebrate its role in the conservation of the species . The opportunity to see this species of coot is often mentioned as a reason for visiting the reserve.

=== Fish ===
Specimens of Spanish toothcarp have been released in the reserve.

== Conservation and access ==
The reserve was granted the status of Concerted Nature Reserve in 1999. This type of protection is unique to Andalusia and is mainly used for reserves on municipal property. A proposal that the reserve be designated a Special Protection Area has received the support of the regional government.

The reserve is open to the public on a limited basis. There are a number of bird hides.

== Threats to the reserve ==
Some land near the reserve is used for urban development. However, there is some undeveloped land near the reserve which could be used to expand it.

The reserve is separated from the sea by a road and then a wide beach. There is potentially a threat to the reserve from coastal erosion, although Motril is committed to protecting its beaches. In the past the delta grew from the deposition of sediment carried by the Guadalfeo. Since the construction of the Rules dam, the river has not brought sediment down to the delta. To counteract the effects of erosion, Motril made a large investment in 2025 to restore its beaches and protect them with a breakwater. However, this only gave limited protection from the effects of storms in 2026.
