= Guadalmellato =

Coordinates: 37°56′N 4°38′W

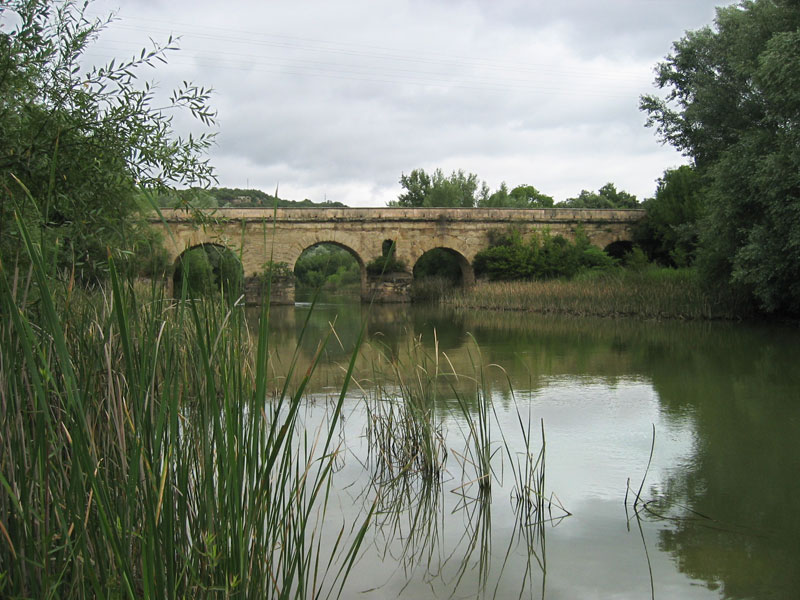
- Puente Mocho bridge over the Guadalmellato near Alcolea, Córdoba.

Location
- Country: Spain

Physical characteristics
- Source
  - location: Guadalmellato Reservoir, Córdoba Province
  - elevation: 196 m (643 ft)
- Mouth
  - location: Guadalquivir, near Alcolea
  - elevation: 111 m (364 ft)
- Length: 110.5 km (68.7 mi)
- Basin size: 2,501.8 km^{2} (966.0 sq mi)

Basin features
- Progression: Guadalquivir→ Gulf of Cádiz

The Guadalmellato is a 110.5 km long river in Andalusia, Spain. It is a right hand tributary to the Guadalquivir. The Guadalmellato River has two dams.

== Course ==
The source of the Guadalmellato is at the Guadalmellato Reservoir where the waters of the Guadalbarbo, Cuzna and Varas meet; these are small rivers bringing waters from the Sierra Morena and subject to seasonal variations. The Guadalmellato flows roughly southwards for about 5 km into the San Rafael de Navallana Reservoir. Further downstream it meets the right bank of the Guadalquivir just east of Alcolea.

Part of the waters of the Guadalmellato are diverted before it flows into the Guadalquivir by means of a canal that runs parallel to the river. After flowing through Alcolea and parts of Córdoba town the canal ends near Villarrubia, a suburb of Córdoba.

== See also ==
- List of rivers of Spain
- List of Roman bridges
