= La Celada =

Village in Córdoba, Spain

Coordinates: 37.279°N 4.307°W

La Celada is an aldea, or attached village, of the larger white pueblo of Iznájar in the southernmost part of the province of Córdoba, Spain.
