= Almodóvar Reservoir =

- Location within Spain
- Coordinates: 36°9′18.73″N 5°38′33.96″W
- Type: reservoir
- Primary inflows: Almodóvar River
- Basin countries: Spain
- Built: 1997

Almodóvar Reservoir is a reservoir in Tarifa, province of Cádiz, Andalusia, Spain.

== See also ==
- List of reservoirs and dams in Andalusia
