= Celemín Reservoir =

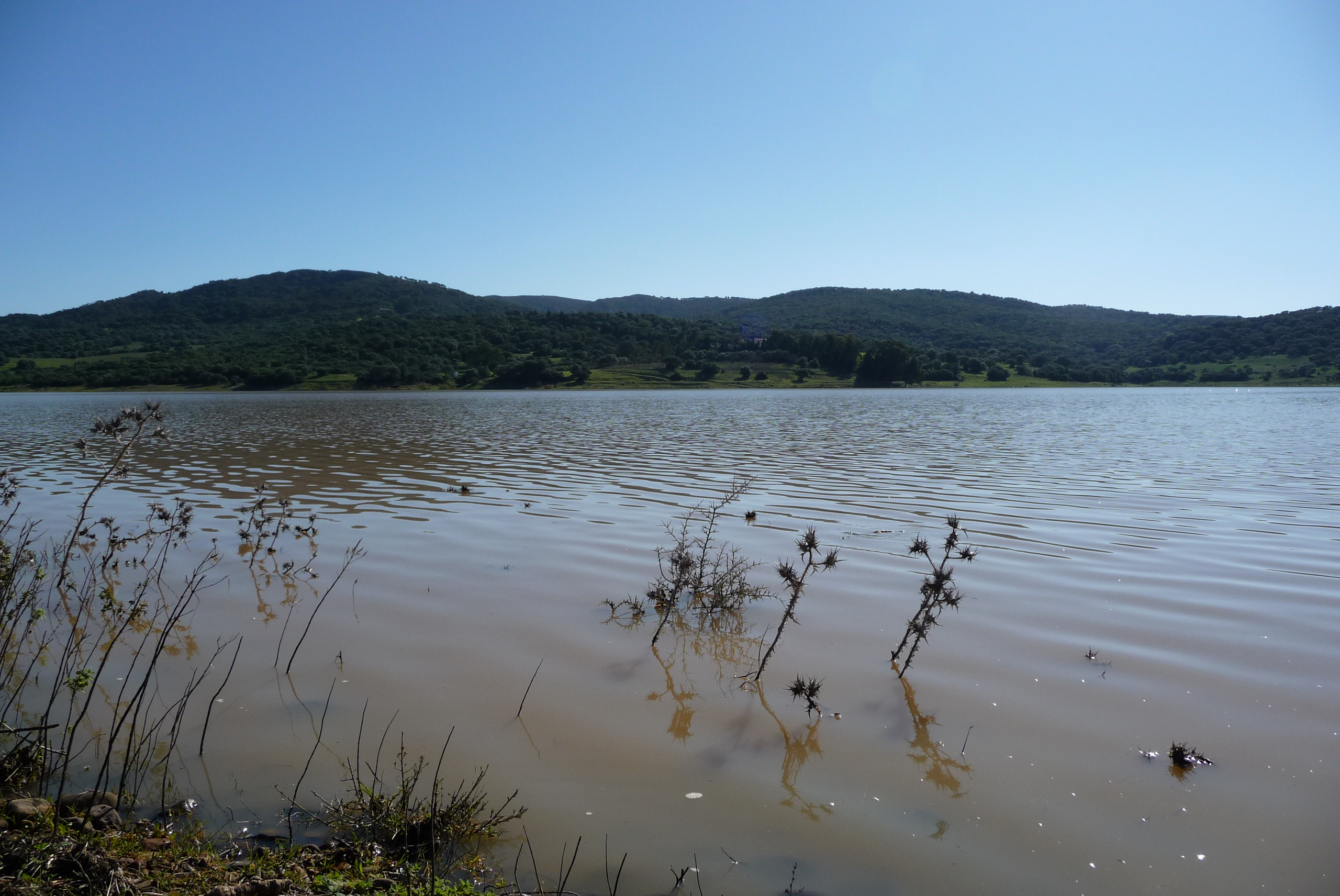

- Location within Andalusia
- Location: Medina Sidonia
- Coordinates: 36°18′11.37″N 5°45′34.19″W
- Type: reservoir
- Primary inflows: Celemín River
- Basin countries: Spain
- Built: 1972

Celemín Reservoir is a reservoir in Medina Sidonia, province of Cádiz, Andalusia, Spain.

== See also ==
- List of reservoirs and dams in Andalusia
