= Canales Reservoir =

Reservoir in Güéjar Sierra, Andalusia, Spain

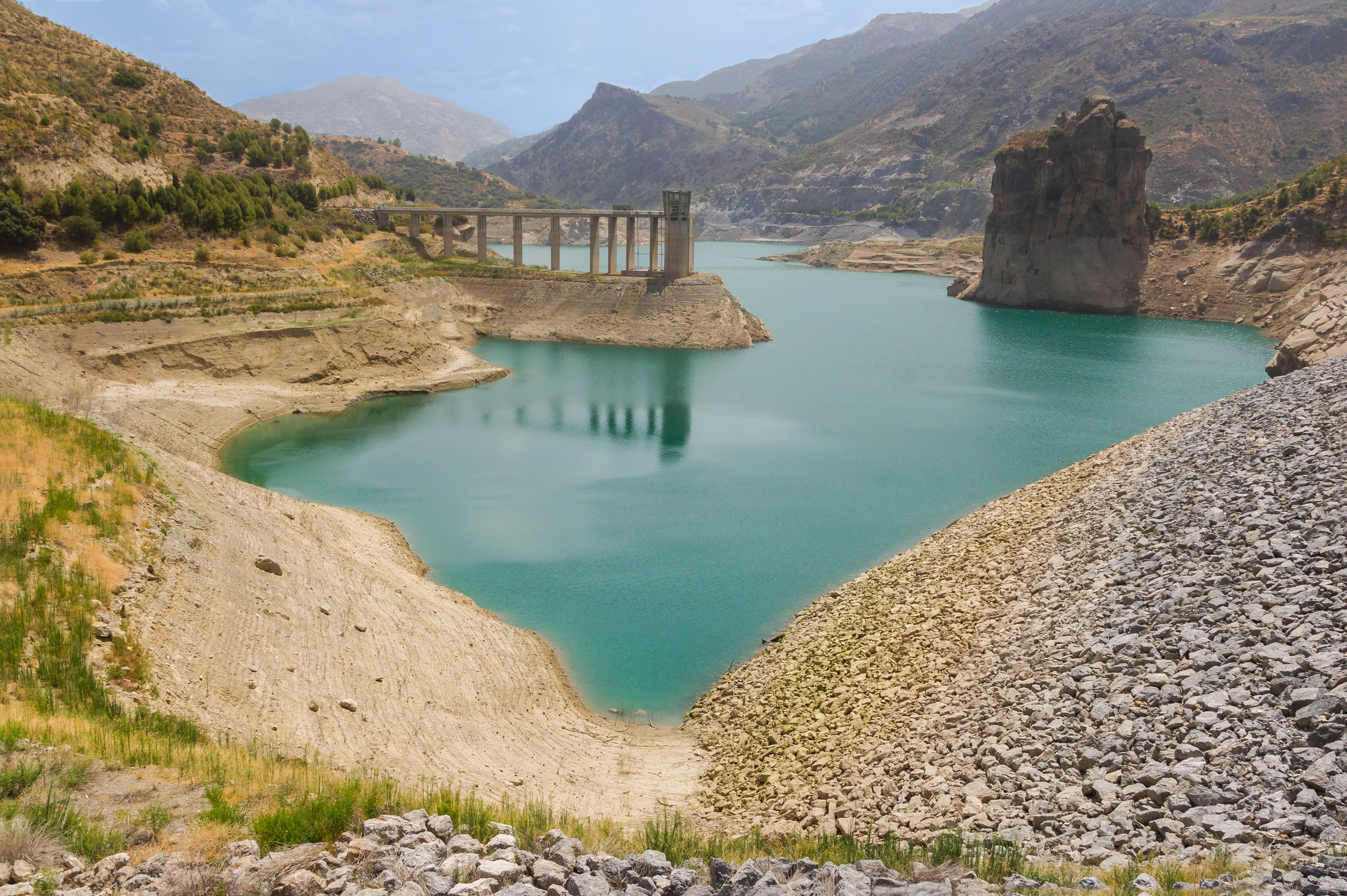

- Location within Andalusia
- Location: Güéjar Sierra
- Coordinates: 37.156°N 3.467°W
- Type: Reservoir
- Primary inflows: Genil River
- Basin countries: Spain
- Built: 1988

Canales Reservoir is a reservoir in Güéjar Sierra, province of Granada, Andalusia, Spain.

== See also ==
- List of reservoirs and dams in Andalusia
