= Retortillo Reservoir =

- Location within Andalusia
- Location: Hornachuelos and Puebla de los Infantes
- Coordinates: 37°50′37″N 5°21′14″W
- Type: reservoir
- Primary inflows: Retortillo River
- Basin countries: Spain
- Built: 1970

Retortillo Reservoir is a reservoir in the province of Córdoba, Andalusia, Spain.

== See also ==
- List of reservoirs and dams in Andalusia
