= La Breña Reservoir =

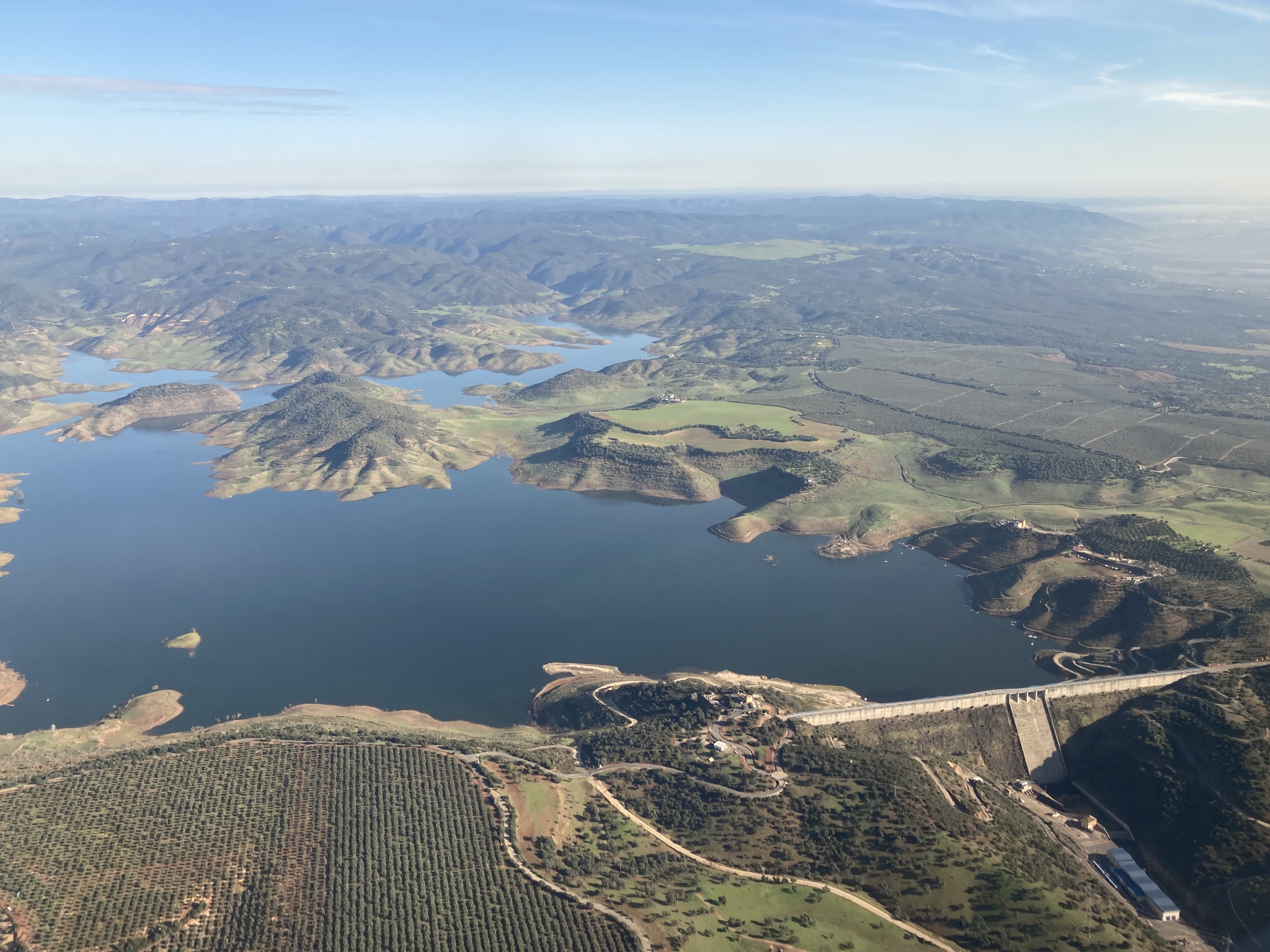

- Location within Andalusia
- Location: Almodóvar del Río
- Coordinates: 37°50′44″N 5°3′2″W
- Type: reservoir
- Primary inflows: Guadiato River
- Basin countries: Spain
- Built: 1935

La Breña Reservoir is a reservoir in Almodóvar del Río, province of Córdoba, Andalusia, Spain.

== See also ==
- List of reservoirs and dams in Andalusia
