= Los Hurones Reservoir =

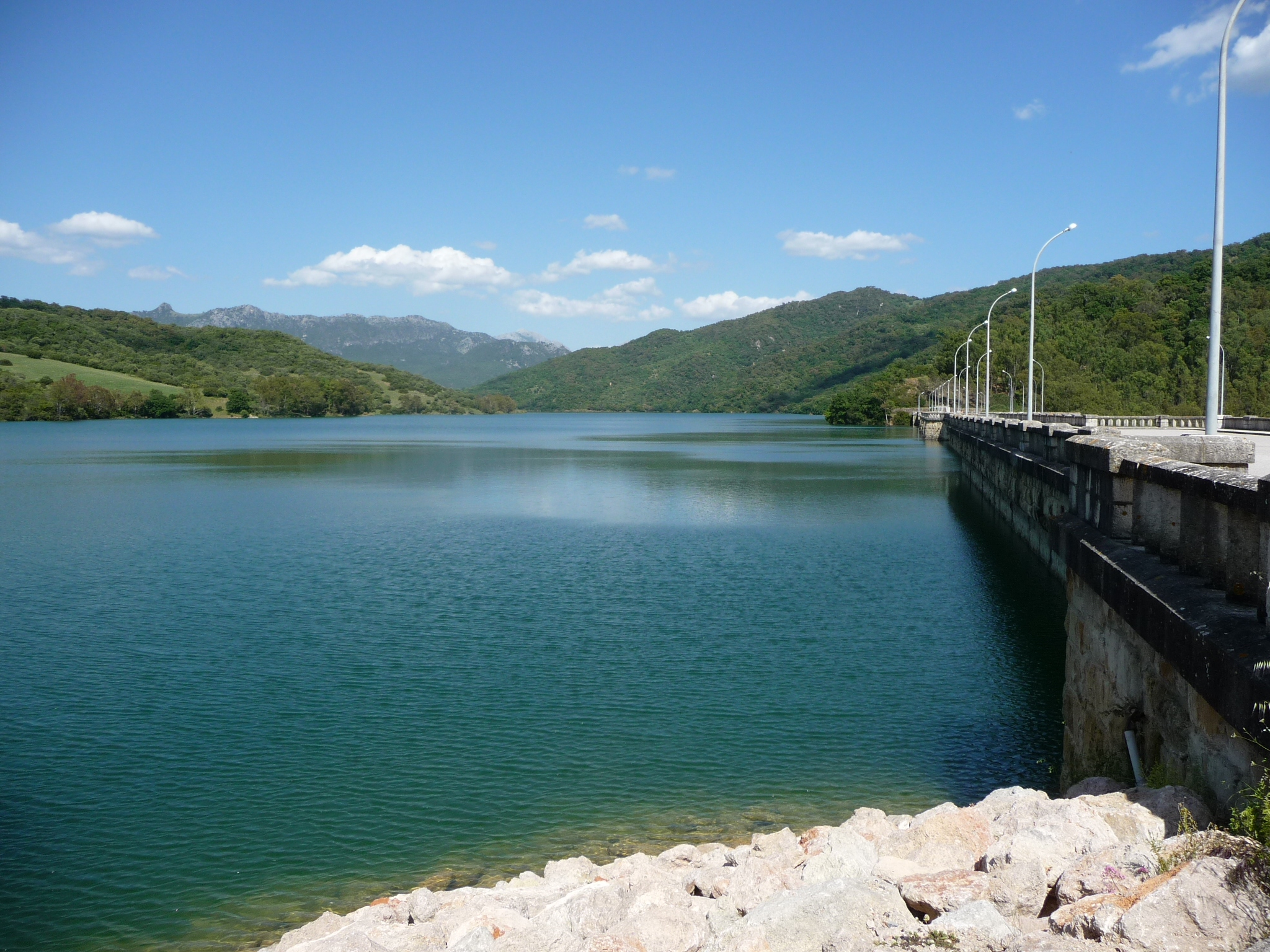
- Embalse de Los Hurones view from the dam

- Location within Andalusia
- Location: Algar and Jerez de la Frontera
- Coordinates: 36°41′14″N 5°32′5″W
- Type: reservoir
- Primary inflows: Majaceite River
- Basin countries: Spain
- Built: 1964

Los Hurones Reservoir is a reservoir in the province of Cádiz, Andalusia, Spain.

== See also ==
- List of reservoirs and dams in Andalusia
