= Charco Redondo Reservoir =

Reservoir in Los Barrios, Andalusia, Spain

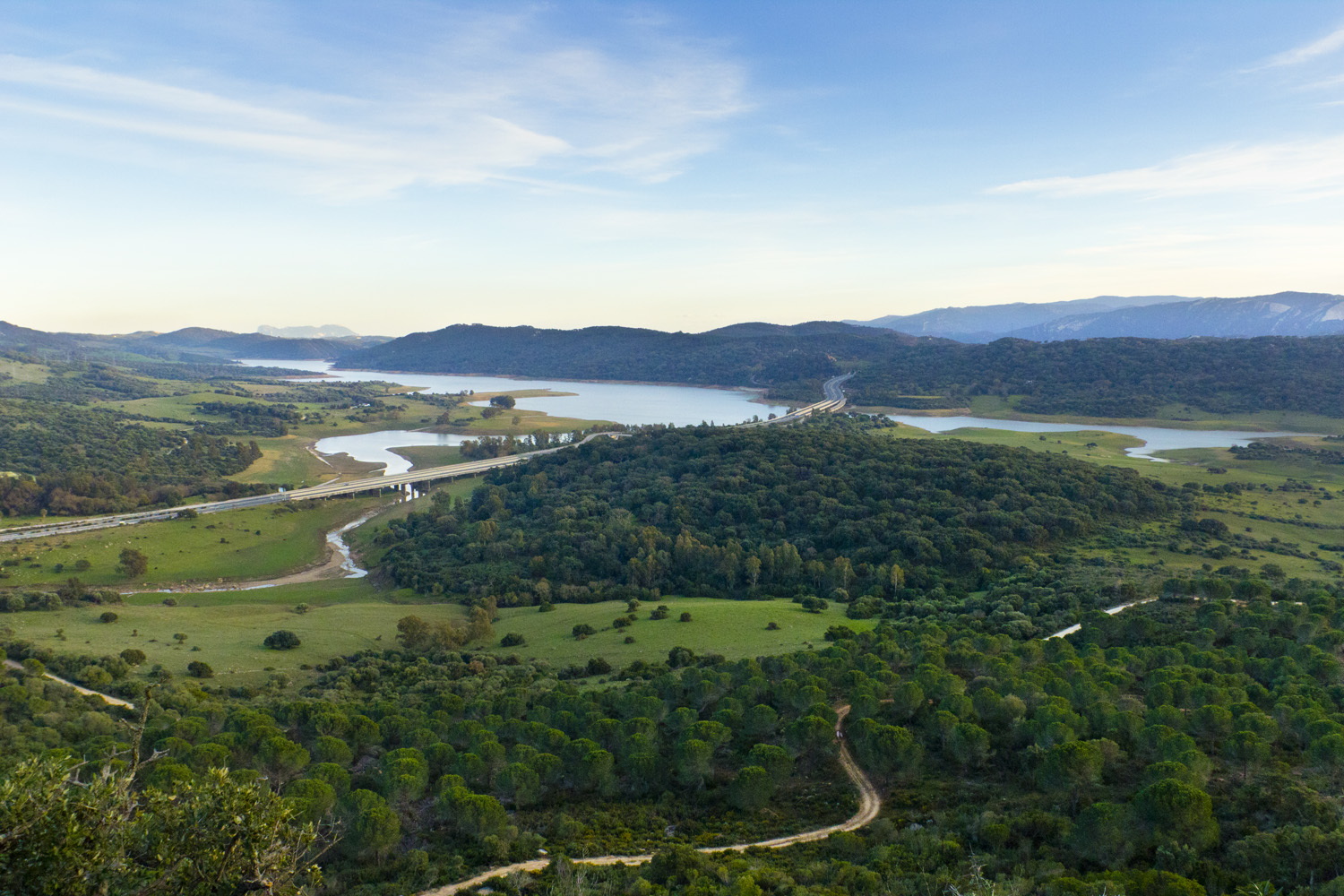
- The Charco Redondo Reservoir from sierra del Junquillo

- Location within Andalusia
- Location: Los Barrios
- Coordinates: 36°15′14″N 5°33′54″W
- Type: reservoir
- Primary inflows: Palmones River
- Basin countries: Spain
- Built: 1983

Charco Redondo Reservoir is a reservoir in Los Barrios, province of Cádiz, Andalusia, Spain.

== See also ==
- List of reservoirs and dams in Andalusia
