= Arcos Reservoir =

- Location within Spain
- Location: Arcos de la Frontera
- Coordinates: 36°45′48.61″N 5°47′45.51″W
- Type: reservoir
- Primary inflows: Guadalete
- Basin countries: Spain
- Built: 1965

Arcos Reservoir is a reservoir in Arcos de la Frontera, province of Cádiz, Andalusia, Spain.

== See also ==
- List of reservoirs and dams in Andalusia
