= El Portillo Reservoir =

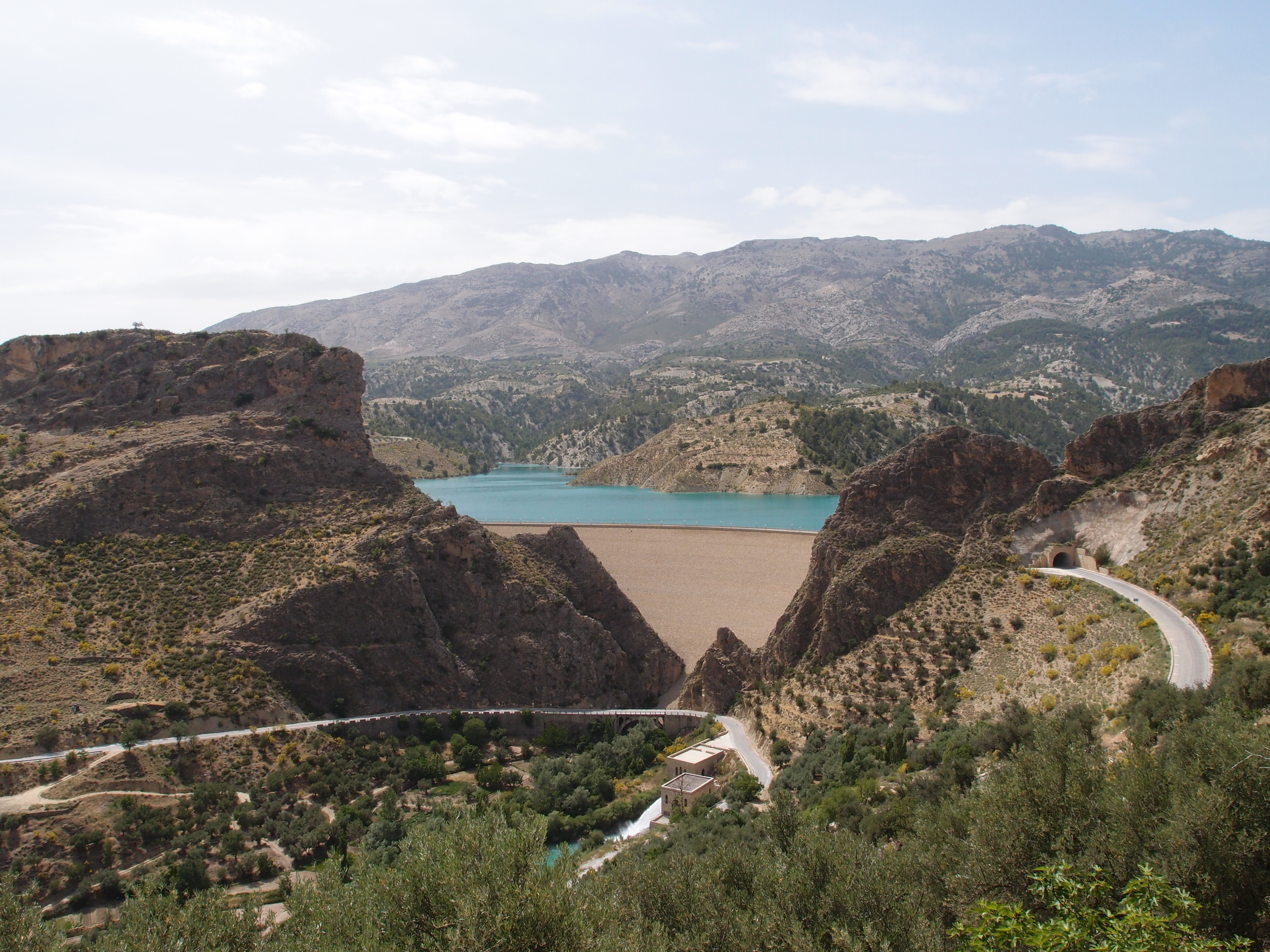

- Location within Andalusia
- Location: Castril
- Coordinates: 37°48′21″N 2°47′20″W
- Type: reservoir
- Primary inflows: Castril River
- Basin countries: Spain
- Built: 1999

El Portillo Reservoir is a reservoir in Castril, province of Granada, Andalusia, Spain.

== See also ==
- List of reservoirs and dams in Andalusia
