= San Clemente Reservoir =

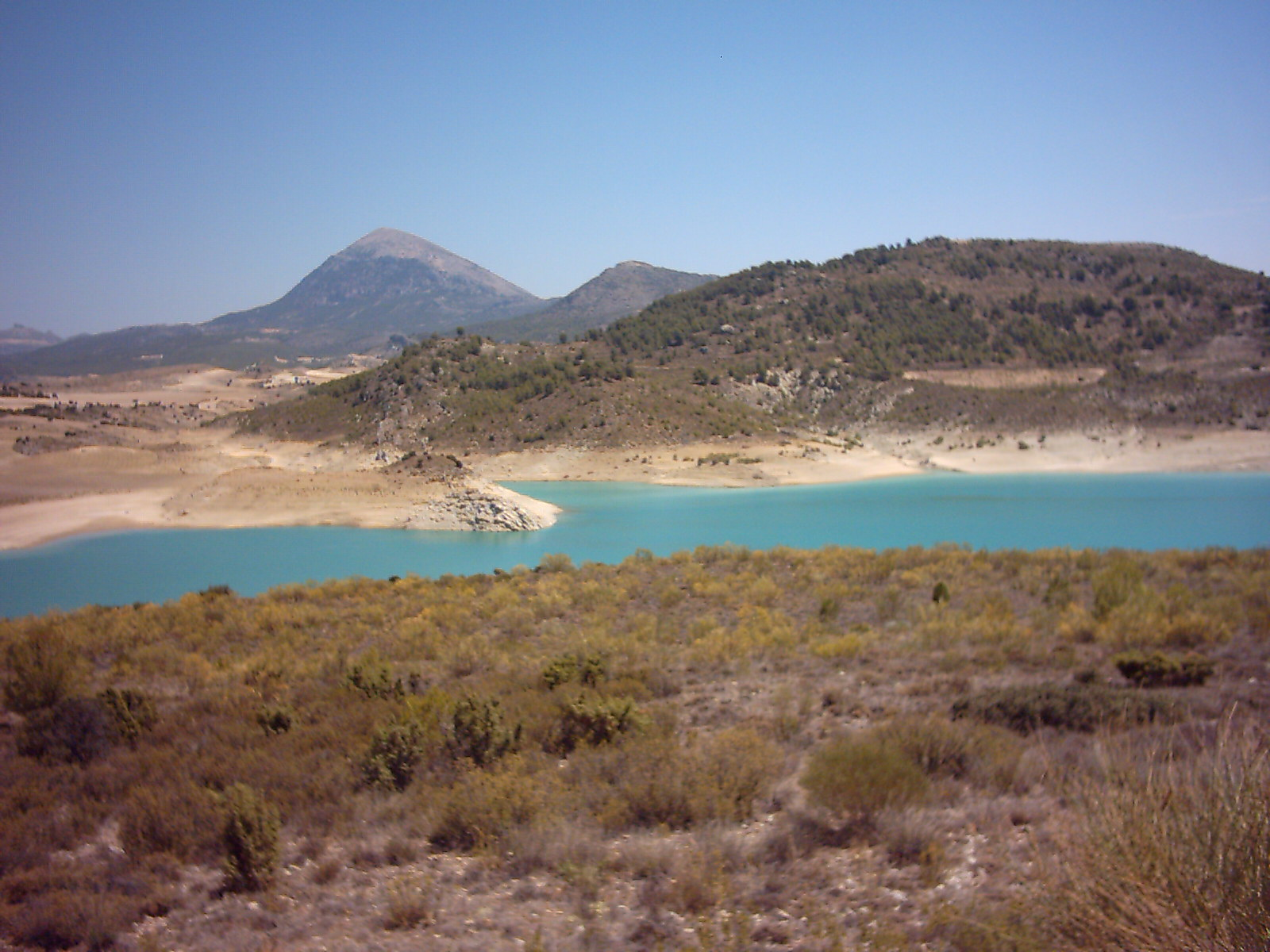
- Embalse de San Clemente

- Location within Andalusia
- Location: Huéscar
- Coordinates: 37°51′56″N 2°38′49″W
- Type: reservoir
- Primary inflows: Guardal River
- Basin countries: Spain
- Built: 1990

San Clemente Reservoir is a reservoir in Huéscar, province of Granada, Andalusia, Spain.

== See also ==
- List of reservoirs and dams in Andalusia
