= Zahara-El Gastor Reservoir =

- Location within Spain
- Location: Zahara de la Sierra; El Gastor
- Coordinates: 36°50′44″N 5°22′49″W
- Type: reservoir
- Primary inflows: Guadalete River
- Basin countries: Spain
- Built: 1992

Zahara-El Gastor Reservoir is a reservoir in Zahara de la Sierra and El Gastor, province of Cádiz, Andalusia, Spain.

== See also ==
- List of reservoirs and dams in Andalusia
