= San Rafael de Navallana Reservoir =

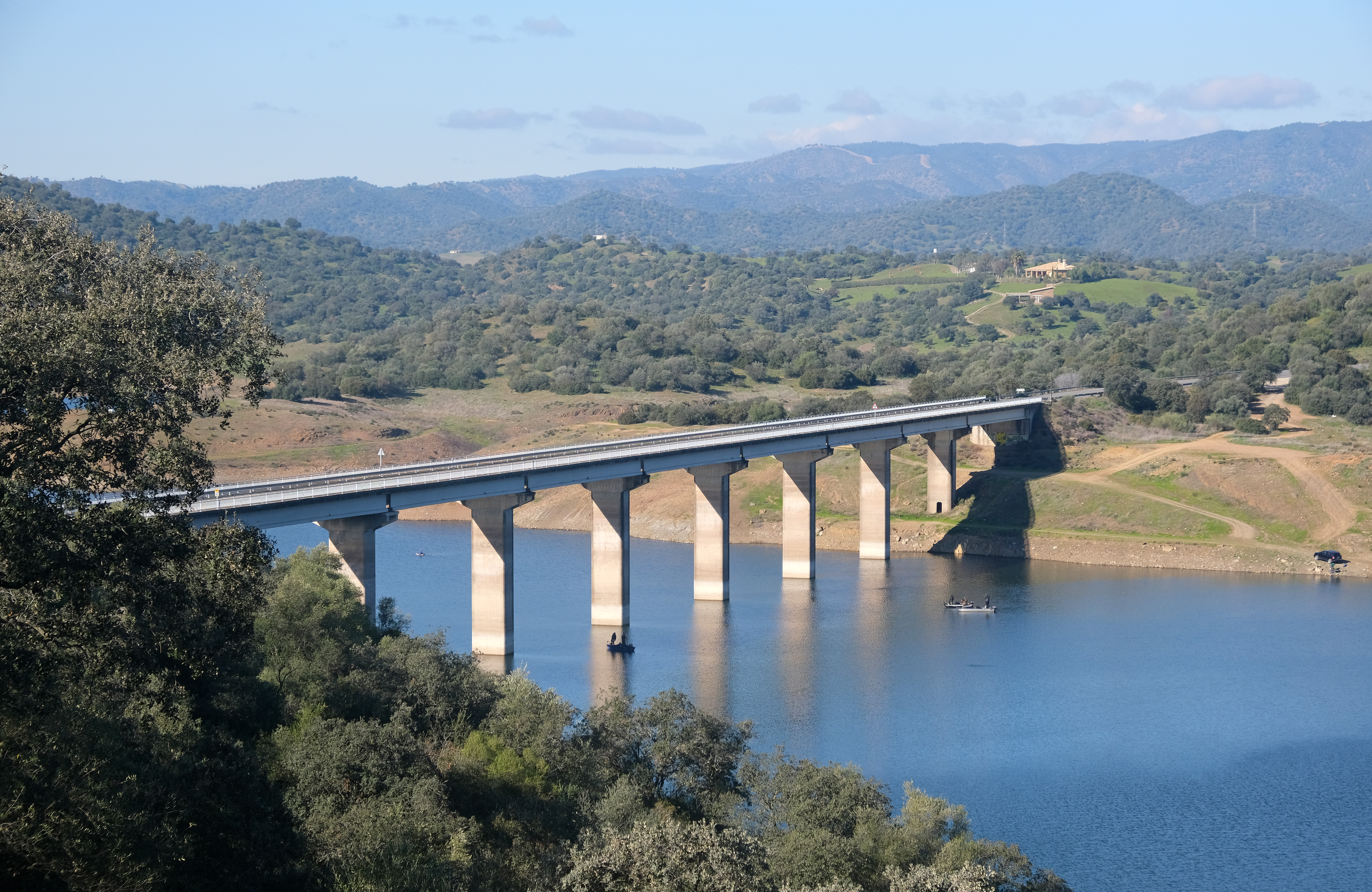

- Location within Andalusia
- Location: Córdoba
- Coordinates: 37°57′52″N 4°37′7″W
- Type: reservoir
- Primary inflows: Guadalmellato River
- Basin countries: Spain
- Built: 1991

San Rafael de Navallana Reservoir is the reservoir in Córdoba, province of Córdoba, Andalusia, Spain.

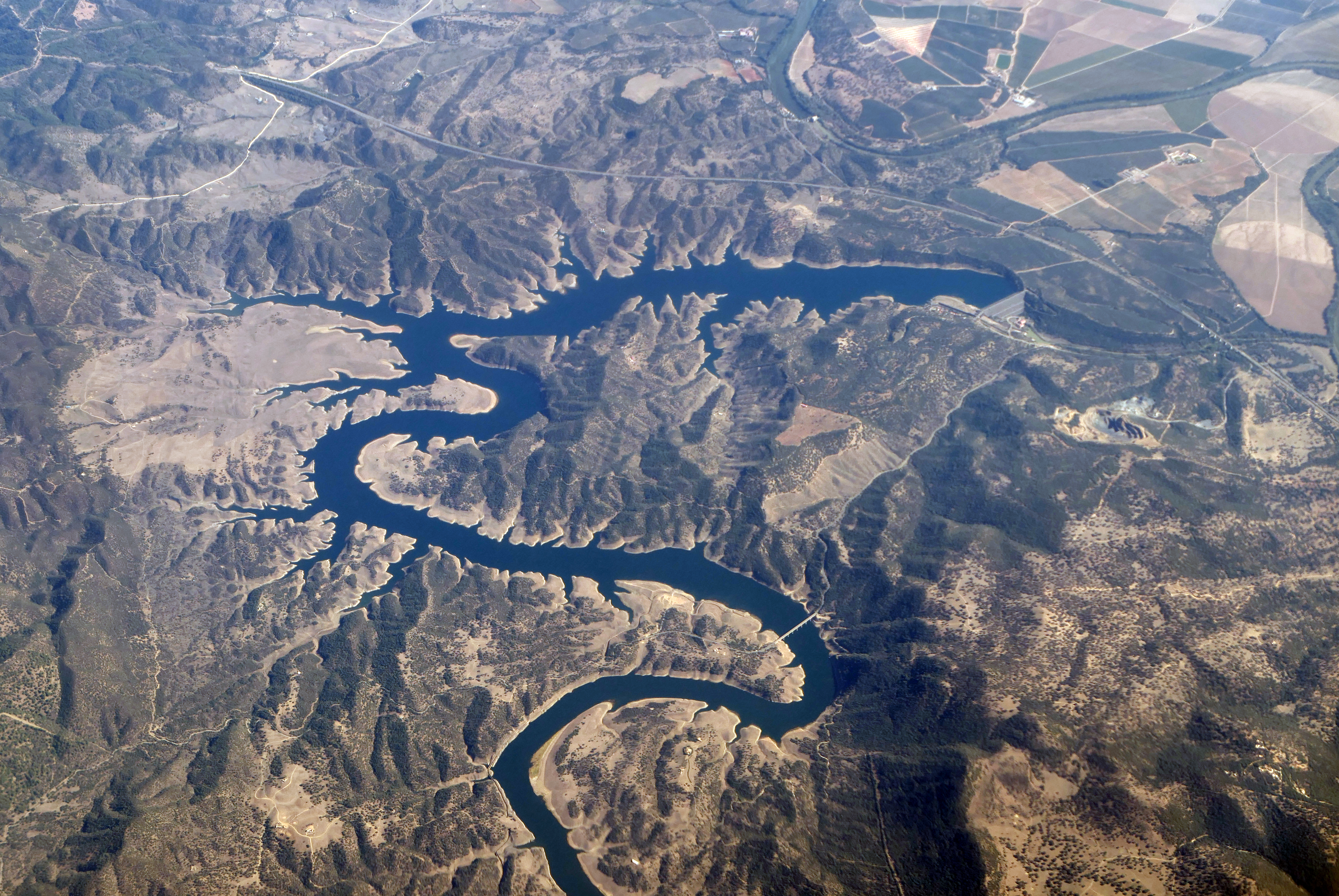

== See also ==
- List of reservoirs and dams in Andalusia
