= Benínar Reservoir =

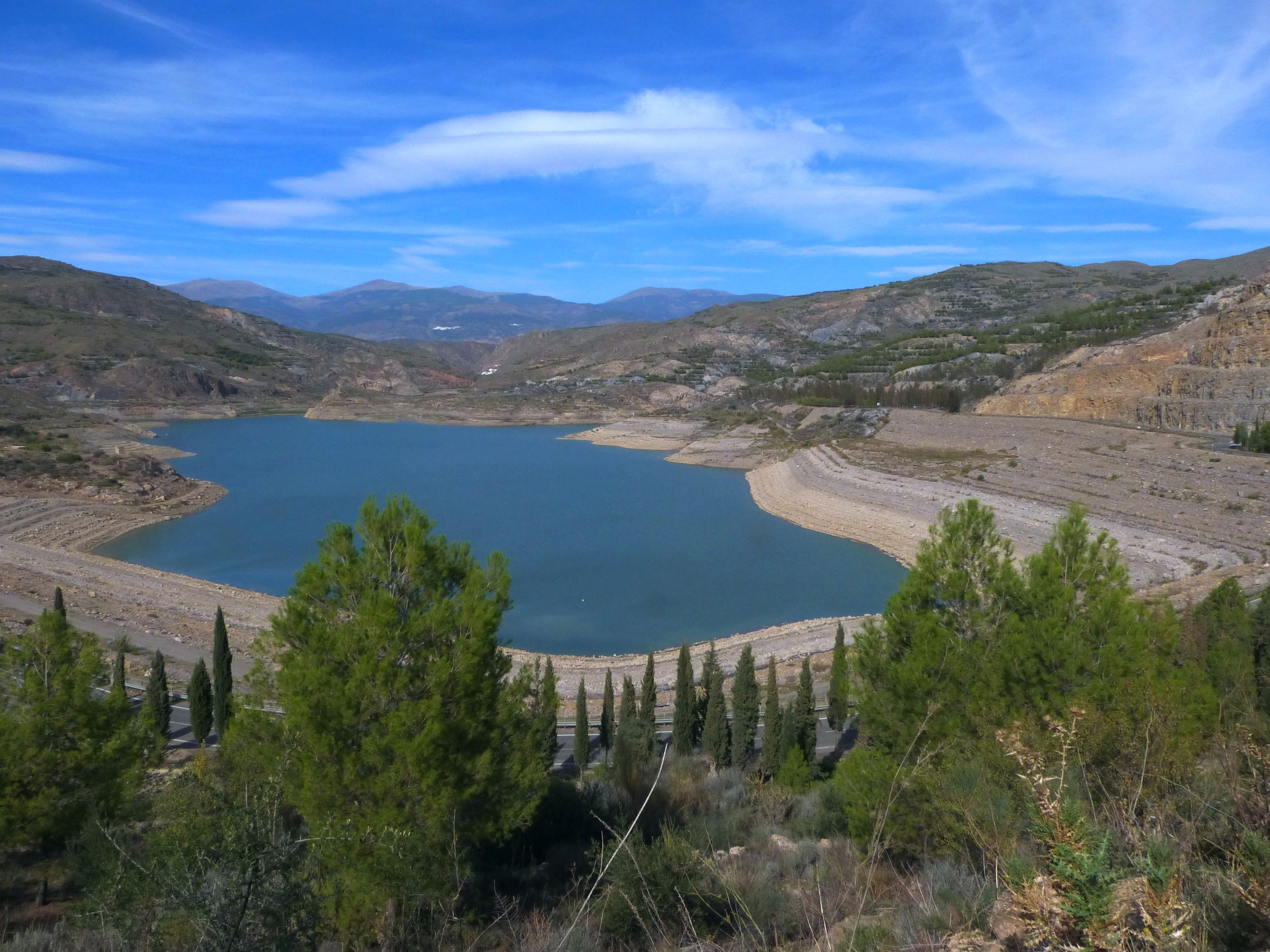

- Location within Andalusia
- Location: Berja
- Coordinates: 36°52′57″N 3°1′31″W
- Type: reservoir
- Primary inflows: Adra River and Grande River
- Basin countries: Spain
- Built: 1983

Benínar Reservoir is a reservoir in Berja, province of Almería, Andalusia, Spain.

== See also ==
- List of reservoirs and dams in Andalusia
