= Guadalmellato Reservoir =

- Location within Andalusia
- Location: Adamuz
- Coordinates: 38°4′5″N 4°41′21″W
- Type: reservoir
- Primary inflows: Guadalmellato River
- Basin countries: Spain
- Built: 1928

Guadalmellato Reservoir is a reservoir in Adamuz, province of Córdoba, Andalusia, Spain.

In 2009, the Iberian lynx which had been on the verge of extinction was reintroduced into the area of the Embalse de Guadalmellato, resulting in a population of 23 in 2013.

== See also ==
- List of reservoirs and dams in Andalusia
