= Rules Reservoir =

- Location within Andalusia
- Location: Vélez de Benaudalla
- Coordinates: 36°52′35″N 3°29′3″W
- Type: reservoir
- Primary inflows: Guadalfeo
- Basin countries: Spain
- Built: 2003

Rules Reservoir is a reservoir in Vélez de Benaudalla, province of Granada, Andalusia, Spain.

== See also ==
- List of reservoirs and dams in Andalusia
