= Colomera Reservoir =

- Location within Andalusia
- Location: Colomera
- Coordinates: 37°24′12.74″N 3°43′15.2″W
- Type: reservoir
- Primary inflows: Colomera River
- Basin countries: Spain
- Built: 1990

Colomera Reservoir is a reservoir in Colomera, province of Granada, Andalusia, Spain.

== See also ==
- List of reservoirs and dams in Andalusia
