= Bornos Reservoir =

Reservoir in Andalusia, Spain

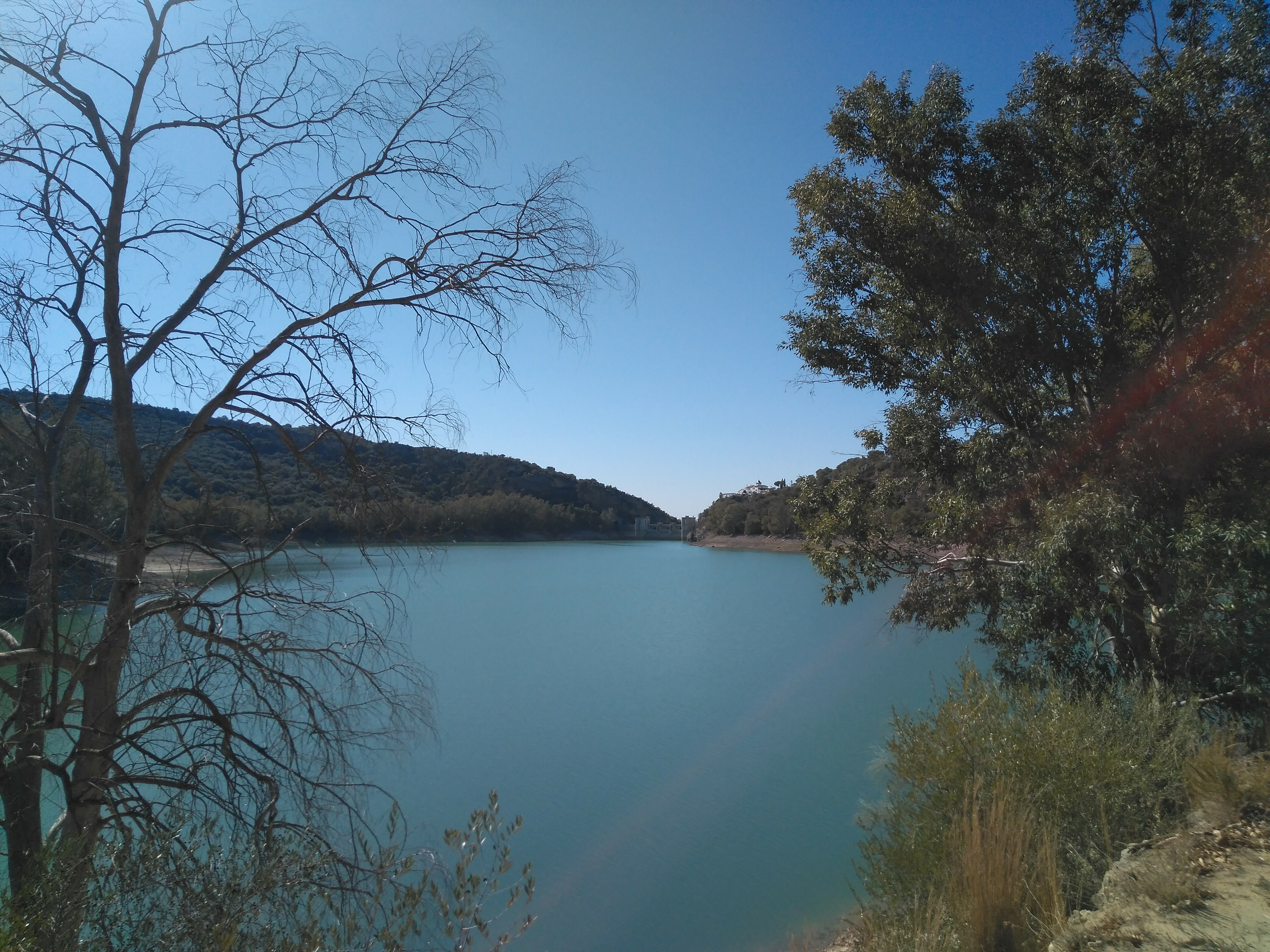
- Bornos reservoir

- Location within Andalusia
- Location: Bornos
- Coordinates: 36°48′35″N 5°42′38″W
- Type: reservoir
- Primary inflows: Guadalete River
- Basin countries: Spain
- Built: 1961

Bornos Reservoir is a reservoir in Bornos, province of Cádiz, Andalusia, Spain.

== See also ==
- List of reservoirs and dams in Andalusia
