= Cuevas del Almanzora Reservoir =

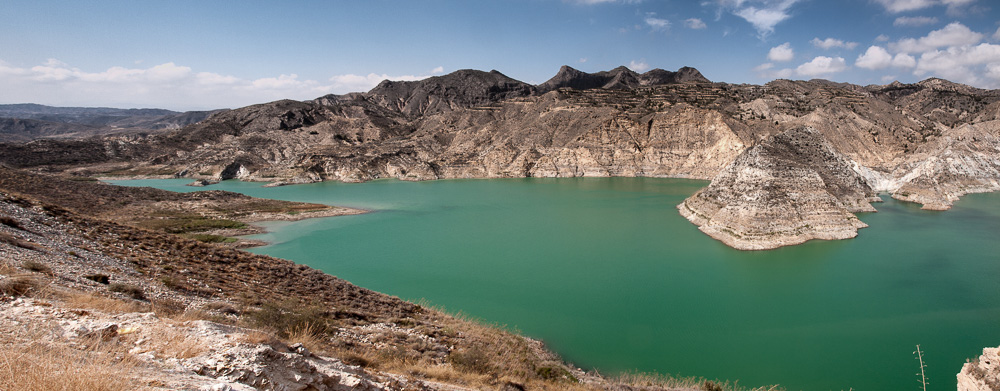

- Location within Andalusia
- Location: Cuevas del Almanzora
- Coordinates: 37°19′40″N 1°54′0″W
- Type: reservoir
- Primary inflows: Almanzora River
- Basin countries: Spain
- Built: 1986

Cuevas del Almanzora Reservoir is a reservoir in Cuevas del Almanzora, province of Almeria, Andalusia, Spain.

== See also ==
- List of reservoirs and dams in Andalusia
