= Martín Gonzalo Reservoir =

- Location within Andalusia
- Location: Montoro
- Coordinates: 38°5′53″N 4°20′4″W
- Type: reservoir
- Primary inflows: Martín River
- Basin countries: Spain
- Built: 1989

Martín Gonzalo Reservoir is a reservoir in Montoro, province of Córdoba, Andalusia, Spain.

== See also ==
- List of reservoirs and dams in Andalusia
