= Francisco Abellán Reservoir =

- Location within Spain
- Interactive map of Francisco Abellán Reservoir
- Location: La Peza
- Coordinates: 37°18′36″N 3°16′12″W
- Type: reservoir
- Primary inflows: Fardes River
- Basin countries: Spain
- Built: 1996

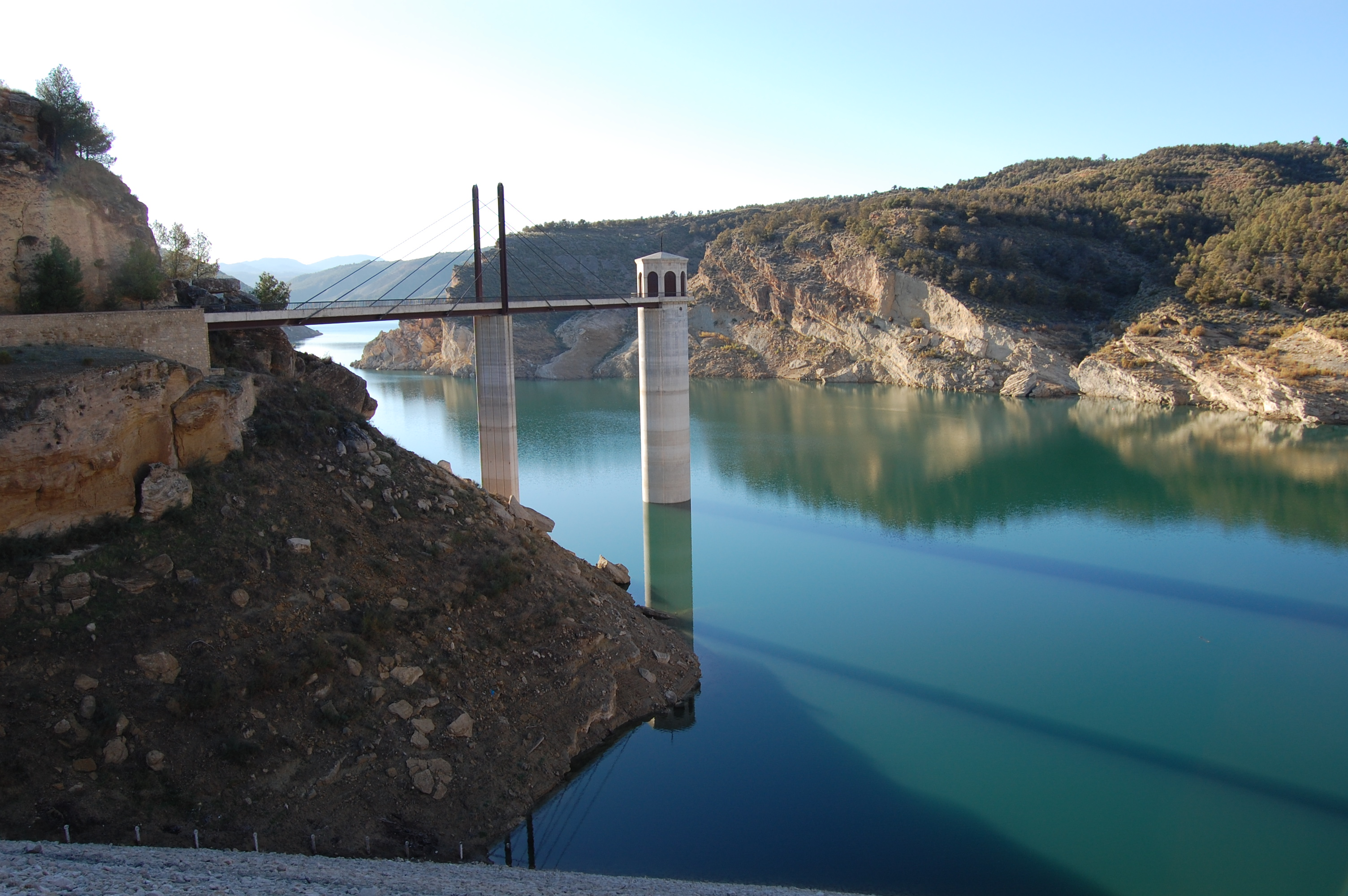

Francisco Abellán Reservoir is a reservoir in La Peza, province of Granada, Spain.

== History ==
Following the floods of October 1973, in 1974 the Confederación Hidrográfica del Guadalquivir studied, within the Coordinated Plan of Works, the possibility of building a reservoir with the aim of preventing future floods and providing an assured a water supply for the irrigation of the Region of Guadix.

The population of this essentially agricultural region decreased between the 1950s and 1970s, with people emigrating even to other regions within the Province of Granada. The construction of the Francisco Abellán Dam largely solved this serious social situation. The reservoir guaranteed that there would be sufficient water for irrigating the approximately 5,000-hectare plain of the Hoya of Guadix during the summer months. This security of water supply put an end to the situation of uncertainty that until then was a brake on investments in the improvement and conditioning of the land, revitalising the cultivation of fruit trees, of great tradition and quality in the area. However, in recent years, with severe droughts, its production had fallen considerably.

The project's engineer was Francisco Abellán Gómez, a native of the nearby town of La Peza, who was also responsible for many other hydraulic projects in the Province of Granada, and for whom the reservoir was named. Work on the dam began in May 1991 and finished in January 1998.

== See also ==
- List of reservoirs and dams in Spain
