= Yeguas Reservoir =

- Location within Spain
- Location: Montoro
- Coordinates: 38°4′50″N 4°13′50″W
- Type: reservoir
- Primary inflows: Yeguas River
- Basin countries: Spain
- Built: 1989

Yeguas Reservoir is a reservoir in Montoro, province of Córdoba, Andalusia, Spain. The construction of the dam was finished in 1989.

The Yegaus reservoir is located in the Yeguas riverbed, which lies in the Andalusian municipalities of Montoro and Marmolejo that come under the province of Cordoba and Jaen. The Yeguas Reservoir is around 16 km from Montoro, 10 km from Marmolejo and 13 km from the town of Villa del Rio.

== Facts ==
The basin of the Yeguas reservoir has an area of 800,8 km2 and experiences an average rainfall of 670 mm.

The Yeguas reservoir has a capacity of 228,7 hm3 and was built with loose materials and a clay core. It is a curved plant and gravity dam with a height above bed of 82, 50m and a crest length of 678,317 m.

Due to the construction of the Yeguas dam, five homes were flooded and a nearby country road was also affected.

== Purpose ==
The Yeguas reservoir was built for a variety of reasons including irrigation, power, improved water supply, ecological flow and last but not least for the purpose of fishing.

== See also ==
- List of reservoirs and dams in Andalusia
