= Bembézar Reservoir =

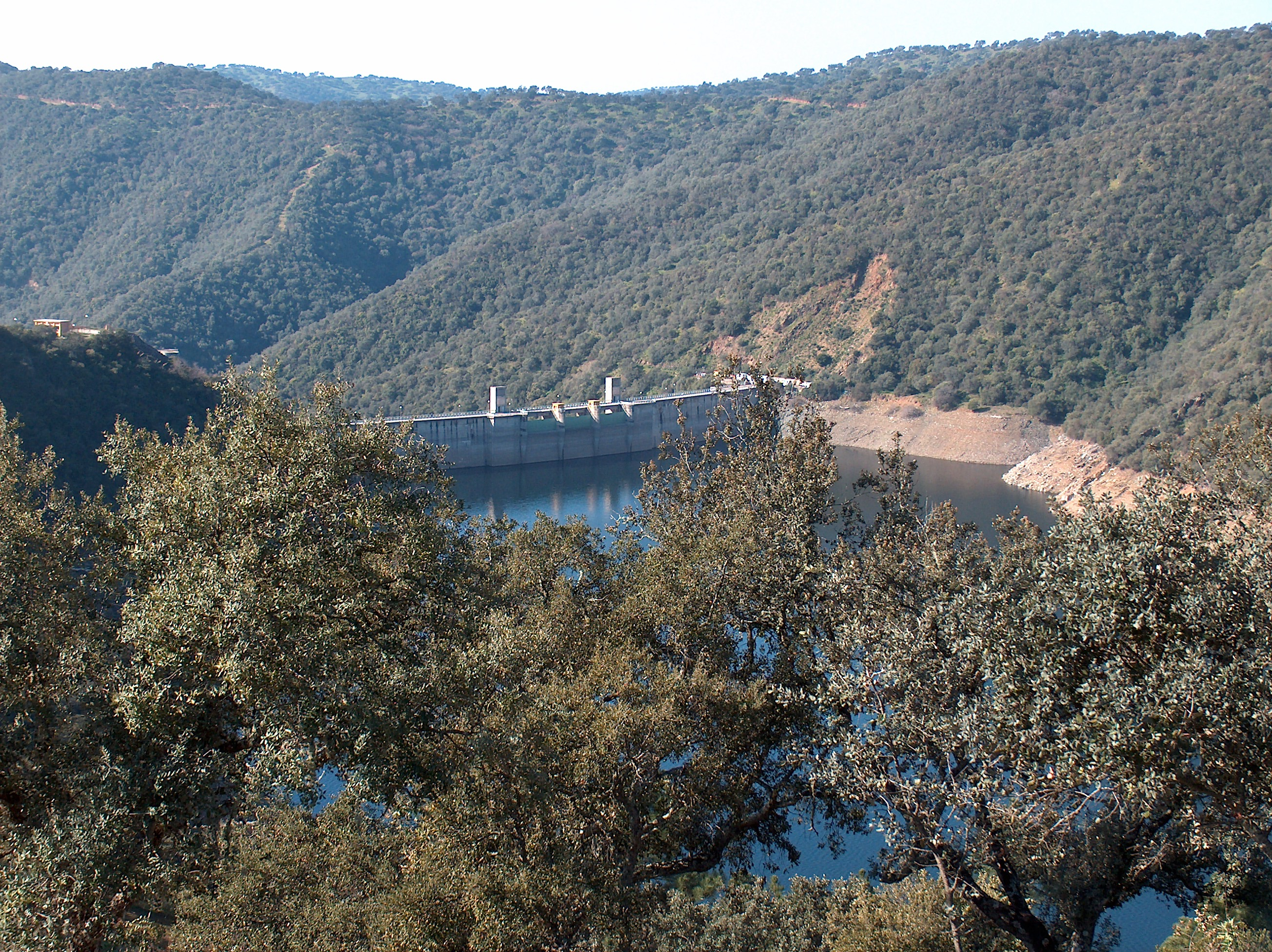
- Bembézar dam

- Location within Andalusia
- Location: Hornachuelos
- Coordinates: 37°58′38″N 5°18′8.2″W
- Type: reservoir
- Primary inflows: Bembezar River
- Basin countries: Spain
- Built: 1963

Bembézar Reservoir is a reservoir in Hornachuelos, province of Córdoba, Andalusia, Spain. It is located in the Sierra de Hornachuelos, a mountain range of the Sierra Morena.

== See also ==
- List of reservoirs and dams in Andalusia
- Sierra Morena
