= Barbate Reservoir =

- Location within Spain
- Location: Alcalá de los Gazules
- Coordinates: 36°22′55″N 5°42′52″W
- Type: reservoir
- Primary inflows: Barbate River
- Basin countries: Spain
- Built: 1992

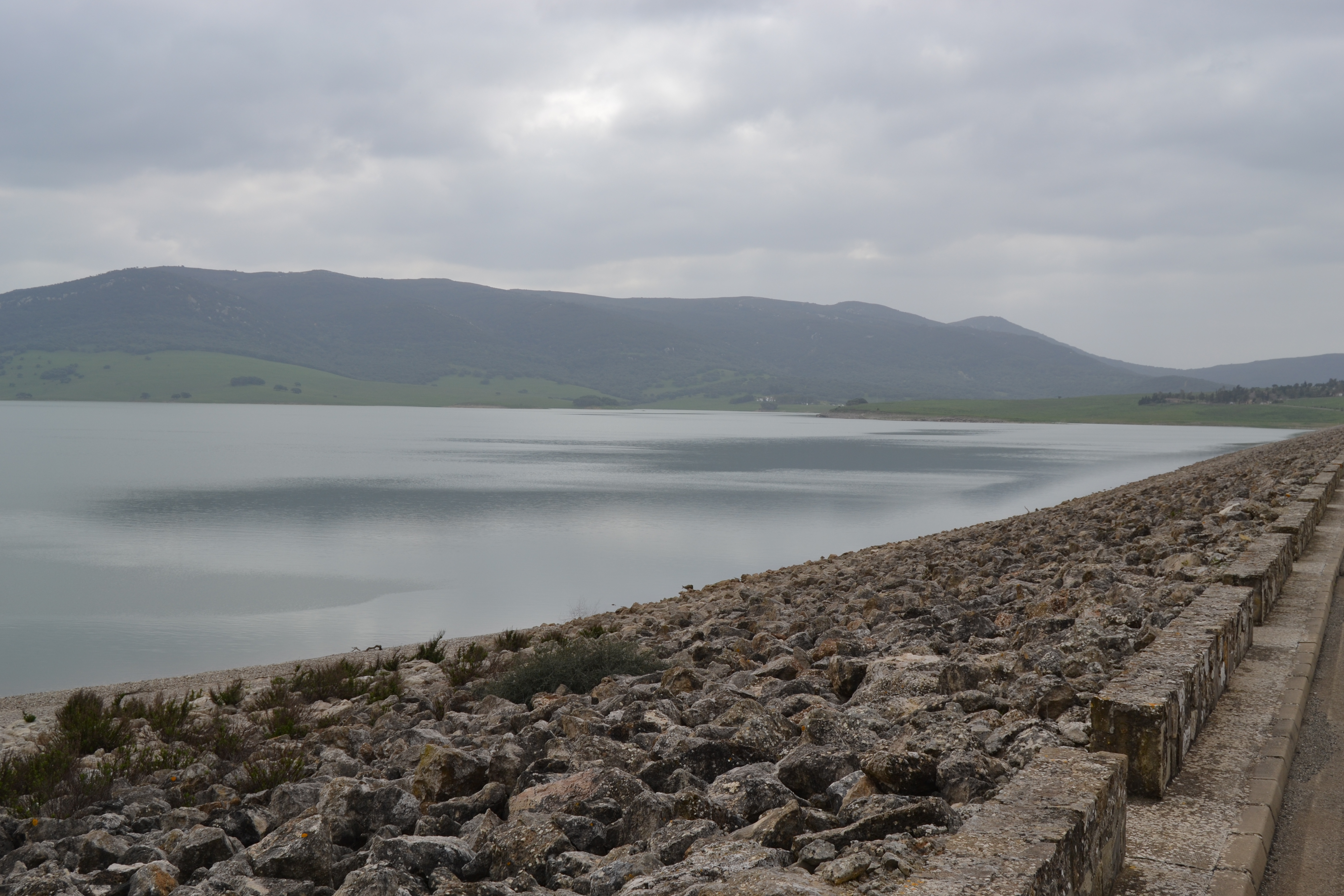
Barbate Reservoir

Barbate Reservoir is a reservoir in Alcalá de los Gazules, province of Cádiz, Andalusia, Spain.

== See also ==
- List of reservoirs and dams in Andalusia
