= La Peza =

Coordinates: 37°16′N 3°17′W

- Flag Coat of arms

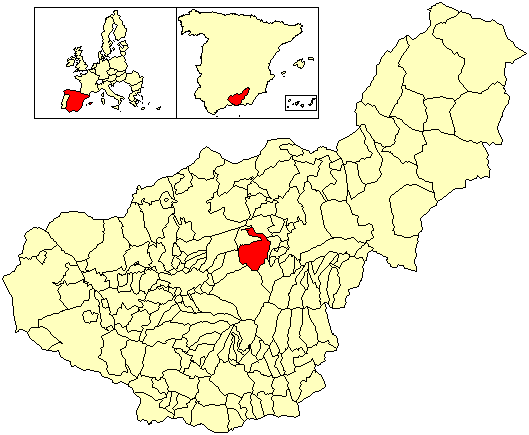

- Location in Spain.
- Country: Spain
- Autonomous community: Andalusia
- Province: Granada

Area
  - Total: 101.29 km^{2} (39.11 sq mi)
- Elevation: 1,055 m (3,461 ft)

Population (2025-01-01)
  - Total: 1,104
  - Density: 10.90/km^{2} (28.23/sq mi)
- Time zone: UTC+1 (CET)
  - Summer (DST): UTC+2 (CEST)
- Website: www.lapeza.es

La Peza is a municipality in the province of Granada, Spain. As of 2010, it has a population of 1341 inhabitants.

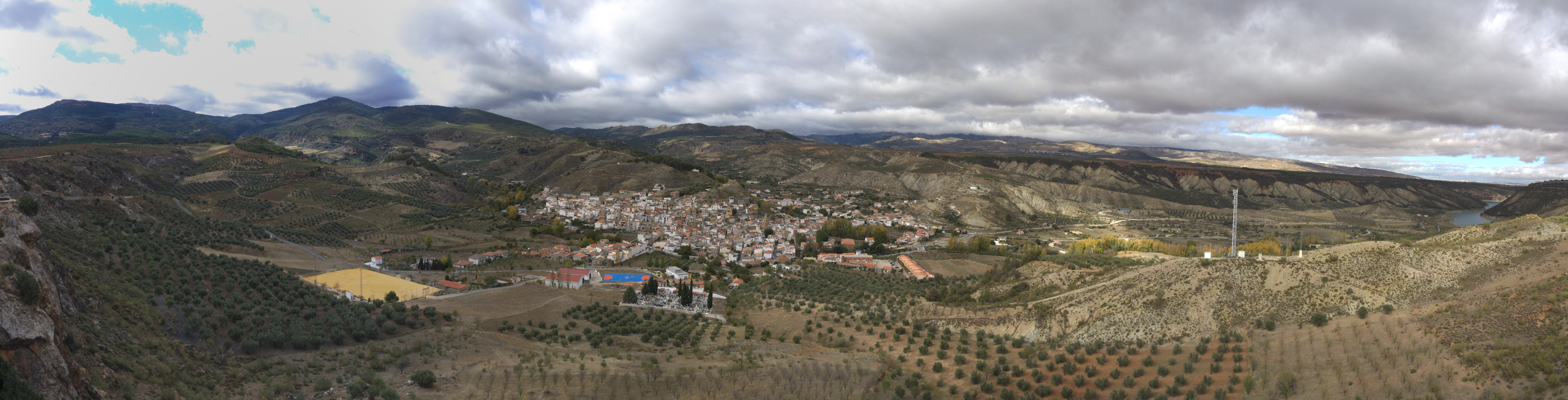
View of La Peza

== See also ==
- List of municipalities in Granada
