= Iznajar Reservoir =

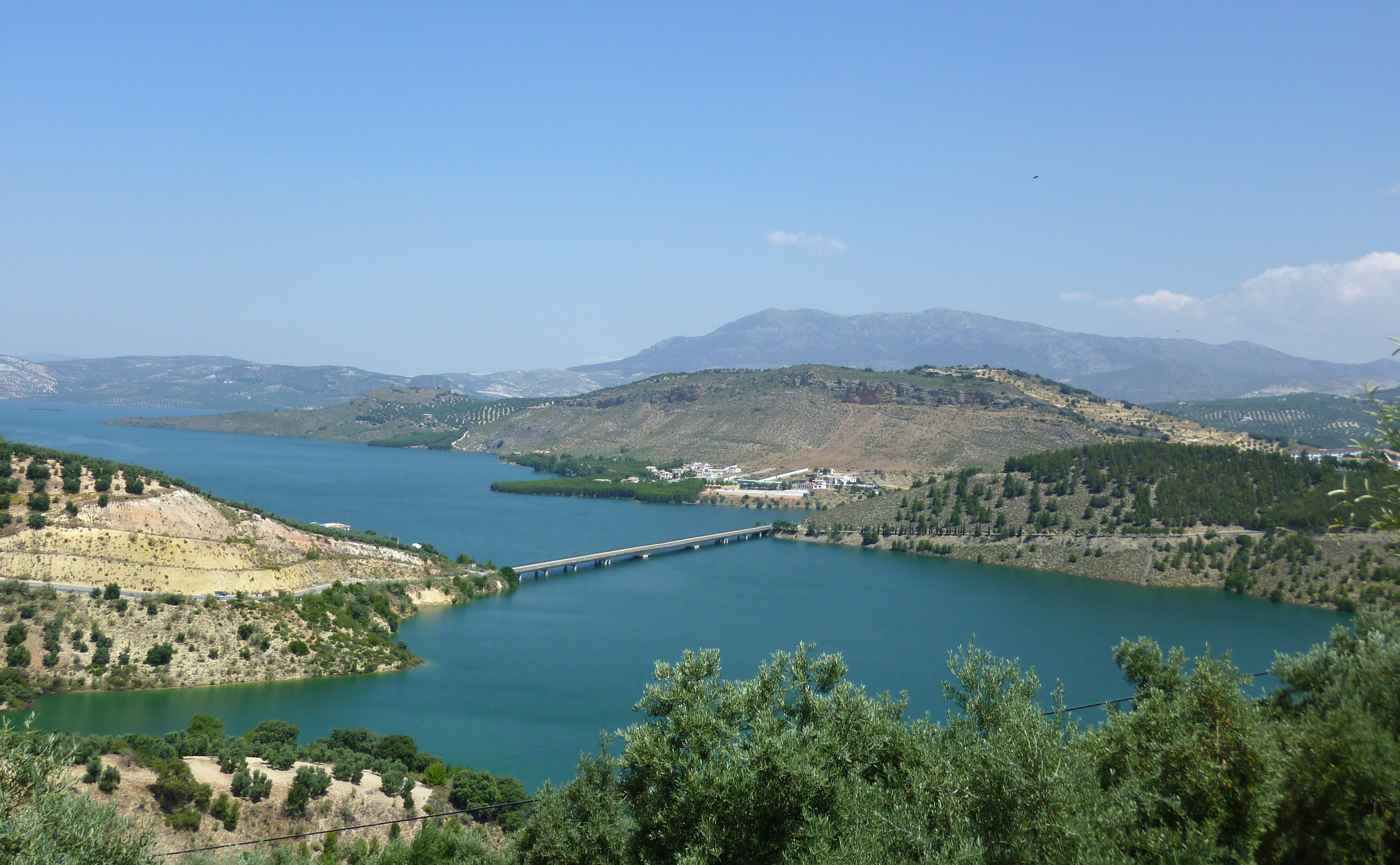

- Location within Andalusia
- Location: Rute y Cuevas de San Marcos
- Coordinates: 37°16′48″N 4°20′44″W
- Type: reservoir
- Primary inflows: Genil
- Basin countries: Spain
- Built: 1969

Iznajar Reservoir is a reservoir in the province of Córdoba, Andalusia, Spain.

== See also ==
- List of reservoirs and dams in Andalusia
