= Quéntar =

Coordinates: 37°11′N 3°28′W

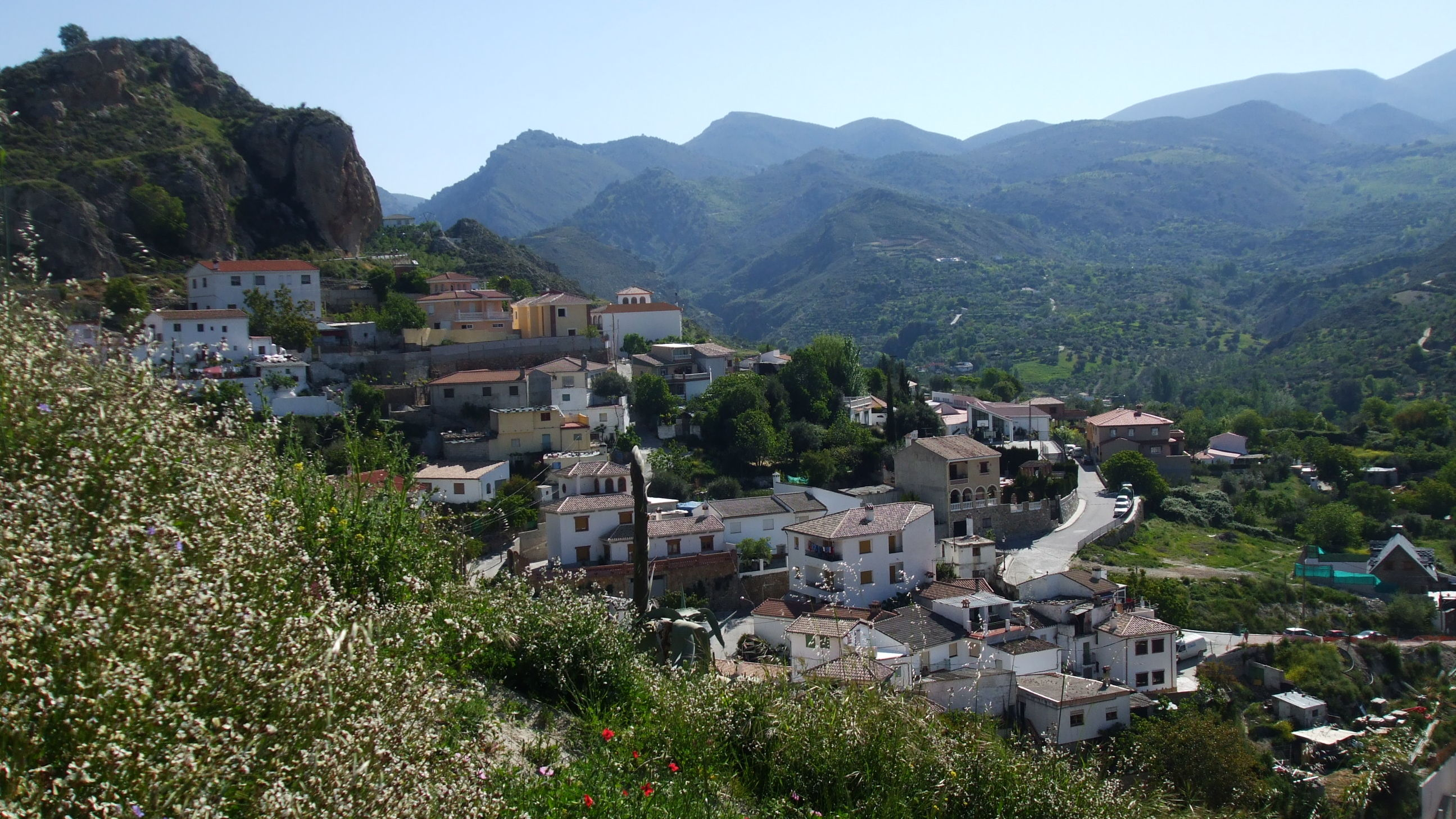
- View of Quéntar

- Flag Coat of arms

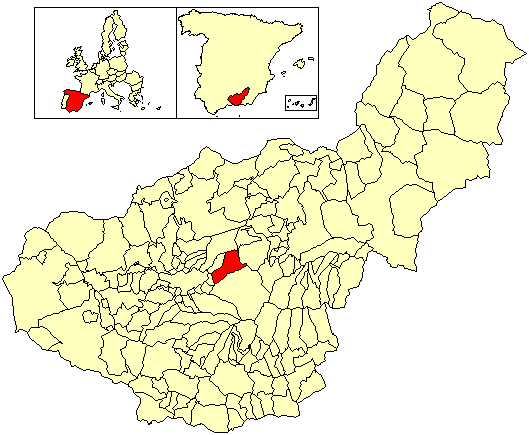

- Location in Spain.
- Country: Spain
- Autonomous community: Andalusia
- Province: Granada

Area
  - Total: 66.49 km^{2} (25.67 sq mi)
- Elevation: 881 m (2,890 ft)

Population
  - Total: 947
  - Density: 14.2/km^{2} (36.9/sq mi)
- Time zone: UTC+1 (CET)
  - Summer (DST): UTC+2 (CEST)
- Website: www.quentar.es

Quéntar is a municipality in the province of Granada, Spain. As of 2020, it has a population of 947 inhabitants.

== Introduction ==
Quéntar Reservoir is located in the center of the province of Granada, Spain, on the channel of the river Aguas Blancas. It is entirely in the municipality of Quéntar.

== Description ==
The Quéntar dam was inaugurated on May 11, 1976; is located in the hill of the Bermejales (by where it is acceded to the swamp), and the hill of Castillejo. Its wall has a height of something more than 100 meters and has a capacity of 13 million cubic meters.

The quéntar swamp has the immediate purpose of complementing the water supply of the city of Granada and the irrigation of its meadow. With the Canales swamp, supplies a population of more than 300,000 and a butterfly valves and Howell-Bunger. The dam is monitored with a complete installation for the observation and recording of its deformations, temperature and tensional state, counting with pendulums, electroacoustic extensometers, air and water thermometers, tensiometric capsules, flexometers, cliometrics bases and a system of measurements of displacements by collimation in the coronation of the dam attend the demands of irrigation of about 10,000 hectares. The tributary basin is 101.5 km2 and its average annual contribution is 35.7 Hm3. The contribution is made by the channel of Quéntar that is united in the potabilizing station of the Boat of Cenes with the channel of Loaysa coming from the swamp of Canales. The dam is double-curved vault type with the following characteristics: height 133 m; crowning length 200 m; excavation volume 175,000 m3; volume of the concrete 275,000 m3. The weir has an evacuation capacity of 600 m3 / s and is equipped with two Taintor floodgates of 4.75x10m. pouring water on ski jump. The thickness of the dam varies from 19.40 m at its base to 3.50 m at the crown. It has two drainage pipes of 1.30 m in diameter closed by but Quéntar Reservoir is located in the center of the province of Granada, Spain, on the channel of the river Aguas Blancas. It is entirely in the municipality of Quéntar.

== See also ==
- List of municipalities in Granada
