= Guadalfeo =

River in Spain

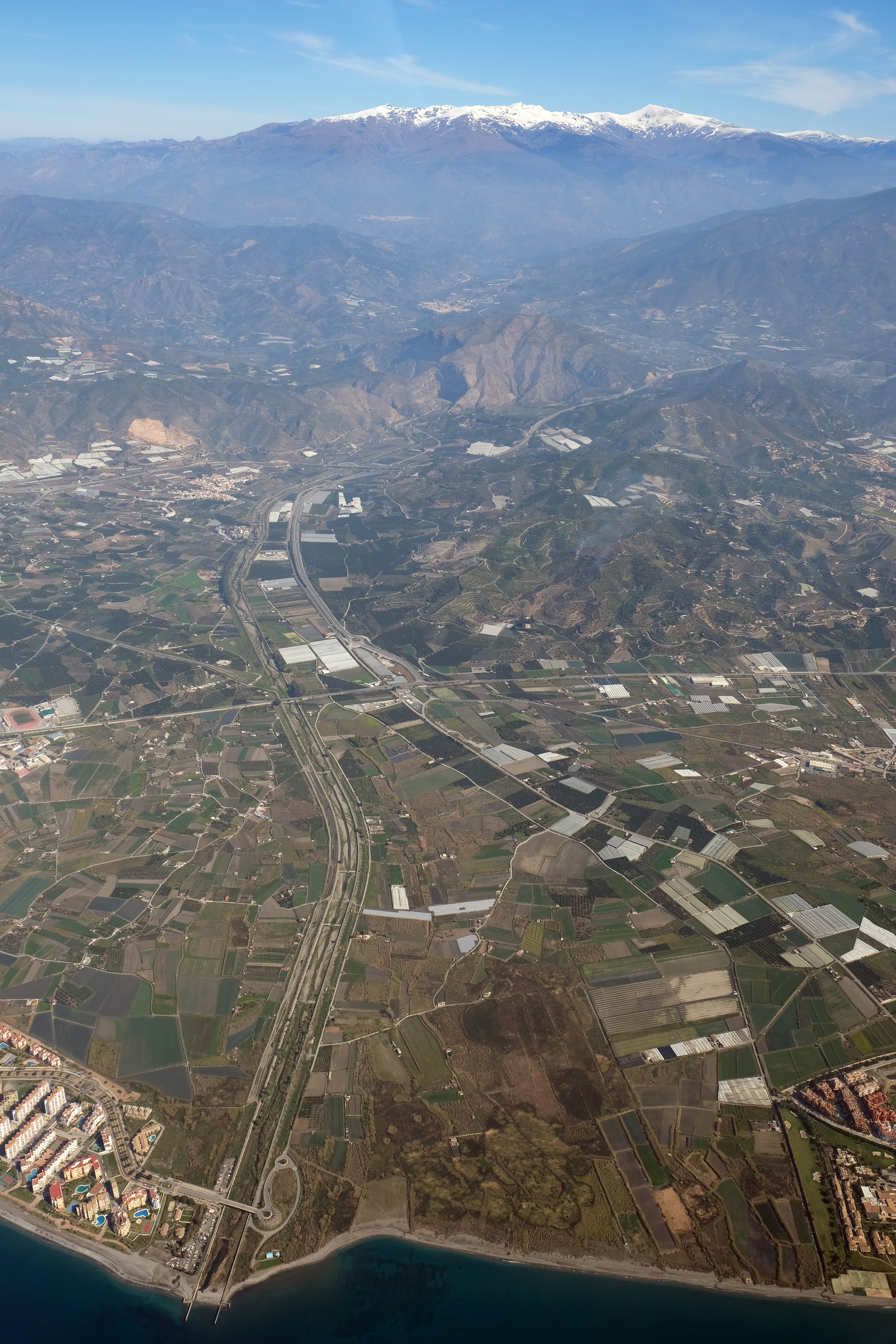
Guadalfeo River, with Sierra Nevada in the background

The Guadalfeo is a small river in the province of Granada, Spain, between the Sierra Nevada mountain range and the coastal ranges of Sierra de la Contraviesa and Lújar.

== Geography ==
It stands on the southwestern side of the Sierra Nevada.

This river is formed by the merging of three rivers, the Rio Poqueira, Río Trevélez, and Cádiar. The Poqueira and the Trevélez join shortly before the confluence with the Cádiar near the town of Órgiva. The river flows through the region of La Alpujarra for much of its course and enters the Mediterranean Sea between Salobreña and Motril after passing through a spectacular gorge between the Lújar and Chaparal mountains.

== Climate ==
The reservoir was built in 2002. The Guadalfeo monitoring network (5 automatic weather stations) was installed on the river in 2004 to monitor the snow dynamics of the Sierra Mountain. The network is managed by the Andalusian Institute for Earth System Research. The area is worth studying as it is a narrow land that stands between the lower elevations of the Mediterranean Sea and the alpine climate.

== Canalization ==
The Rules dam was recently built across the river near Vélez de Benaudalla at the head of the gorge, resulting in the creation of a large reservoir and the flooding of a section of the river valley.

The canalised river is often dried up by the time it reaches the delta, but it supports the Motril-Salobreña aquifer, the waters of which are used for agricultural purposes and maintain a small wetland of 13.78 ha, the Charca de Suárez.

The Guadalfeo Junction is a 7-kilometer road of the Autopista AP-7 with a 220-meter double viaduct (built in 2008) that crosses the Guadalfeo river.

== Fauna ==
The river is home to numerous bird species such as golden oriole, spotted flycatcher, white-throated dipper, western olivaceous warbler, Sardinian warbler, and European turtle dove, and predators such as short-toed snake eagle and Bonelli's eagle.

== See also ==
- List of rivers of Spain
