= Guadalcacín Reservoir =

Embalse de Guadalcacín
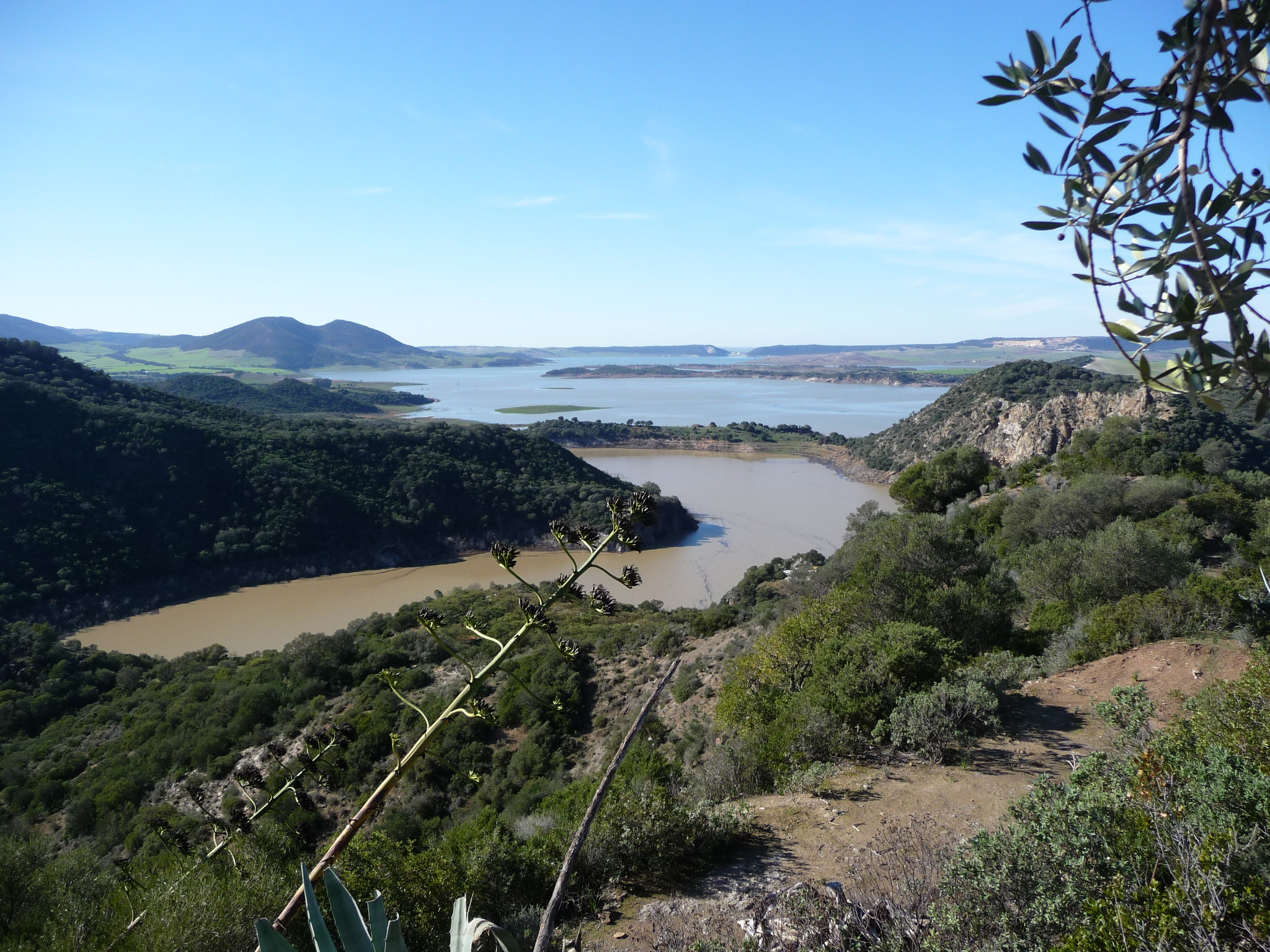
- Embalse de Guadalcacín from Tajo del Águila

- Location within Andalusia
- Location: San José del Valle, Paterna de Rivera, Algar, Arcos de la Frontera
- Coordinates: 36°39′56.39″N 5°46′5.4″W
- Type: reservoir
- Primary inflows: Majaceite River
- Basin countries: Spain
- Built: 1995

Embalse de Guadalcacín is a reservoir in the province of Cádiz, Andalusia, Spain. The reservoir has a capacity of 800 hm³ and a surface area of 3760 ha and is supplied by water from the Majaceite. The current dam, Guadalcacín II, is the 2nd on the lake and was built in 1995 as an emergency works project due to drought. The original dam was built in 1922.

== Inside ==
Inside there is a church, ermita de El Mibral and an old road restaurant

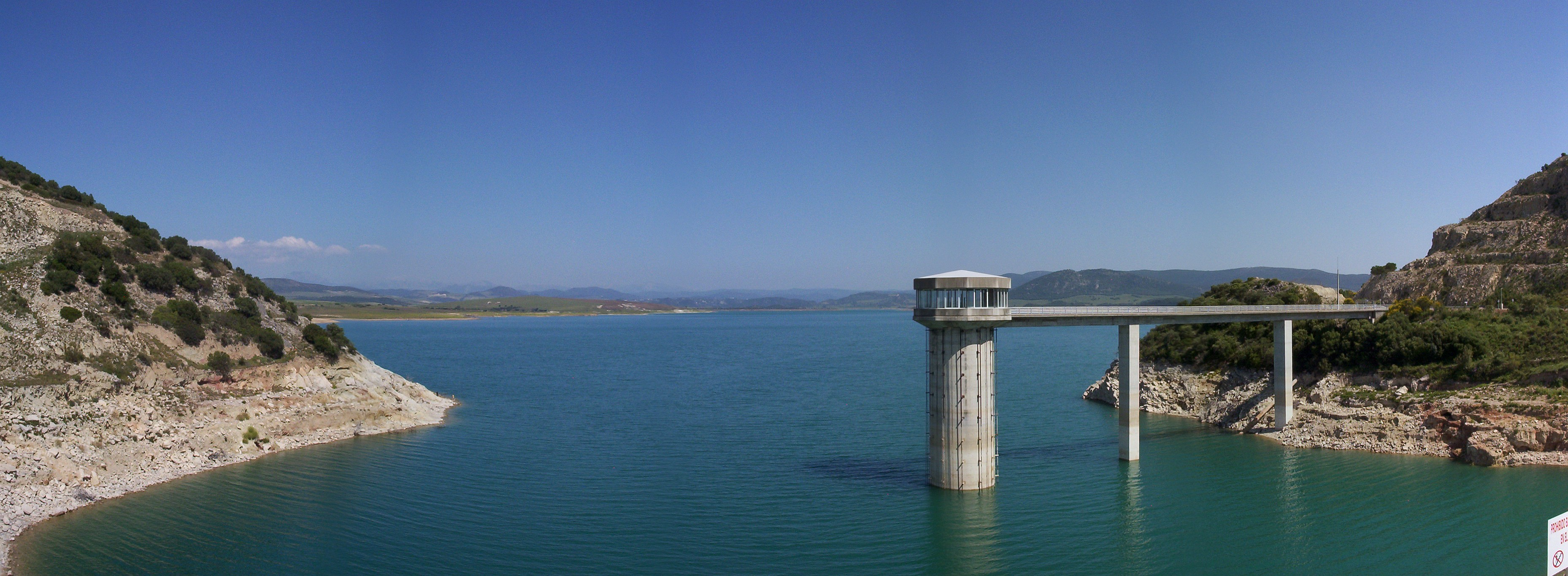
Panoramic view

== See also ==
- List of reservoirs and dams in Andalusia
