= Hornachuelos =

- Municipality
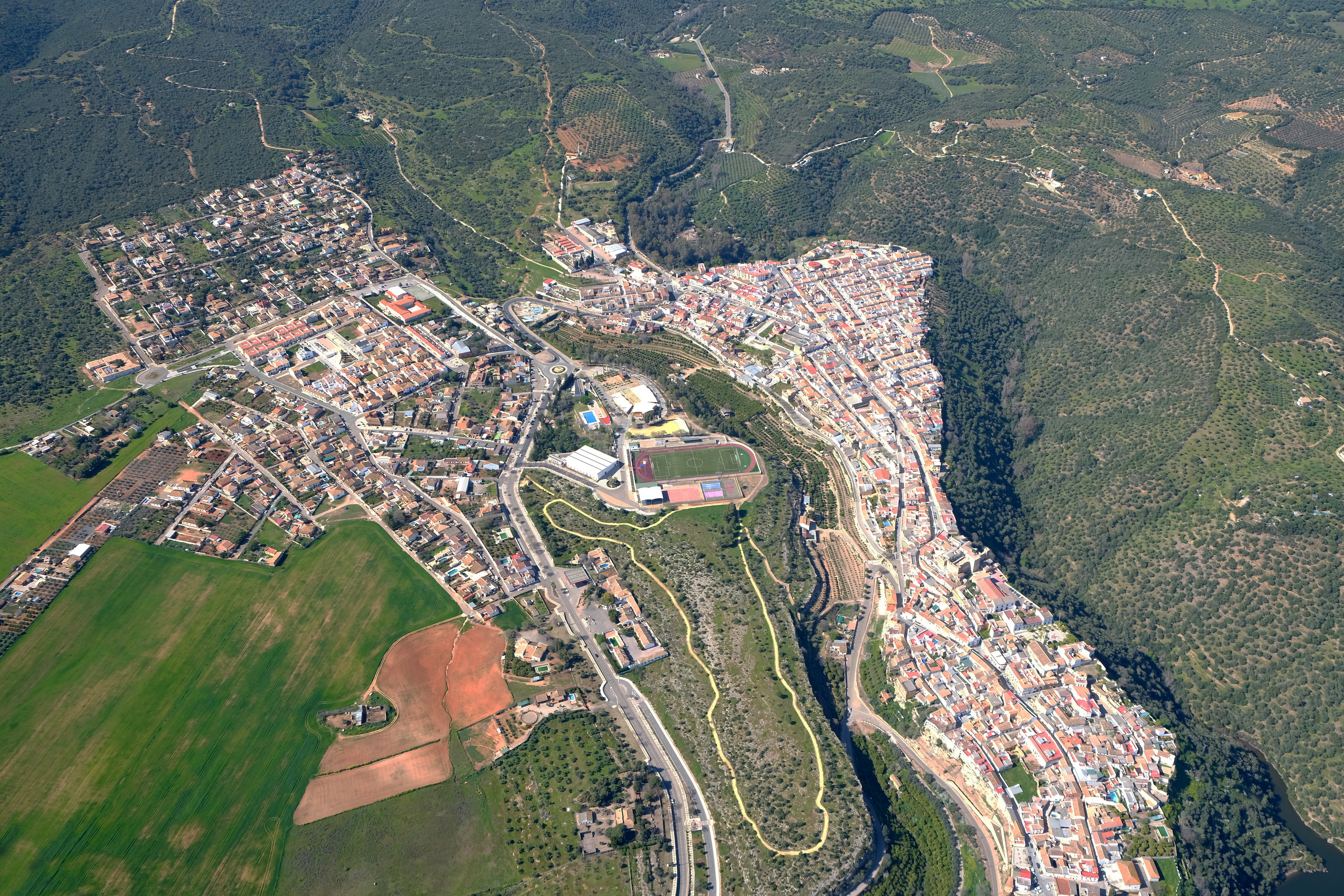

- Flag Seal
- Interactive map of Hornachuelos
- Coordinates: 37°50′N 5°14′W
- Country: Spain
- Province: Córdoba
- Municipality: Hornachuelos

Area
  - Total: 909.22 km^{2} (351.05 sq mi)
- Elevation: 185 m (607 ft)

Population (2025-01-01)
  - Total: 4,383
  - Density: 4.821/km^{2} (12.49/sq mi)
- Time zone: UTC+1 (CET)
  - Summer (DST): UTC+2 (CEST)
- Website: www.hornachuelos.es

Hornachuelos is a municipality located in the province of Córdoba, Spain. According to the 2006 census (INE), the city has a population of 4,662 inhabitants.

The first scene of Act II of Giuseppe Verdi's La forza del destino takes place in "an inn at Hornachuelos".

== See also ==
- List of municipalities in Córdoba
