= Villaviciosa de Córdoba =

- Municipality
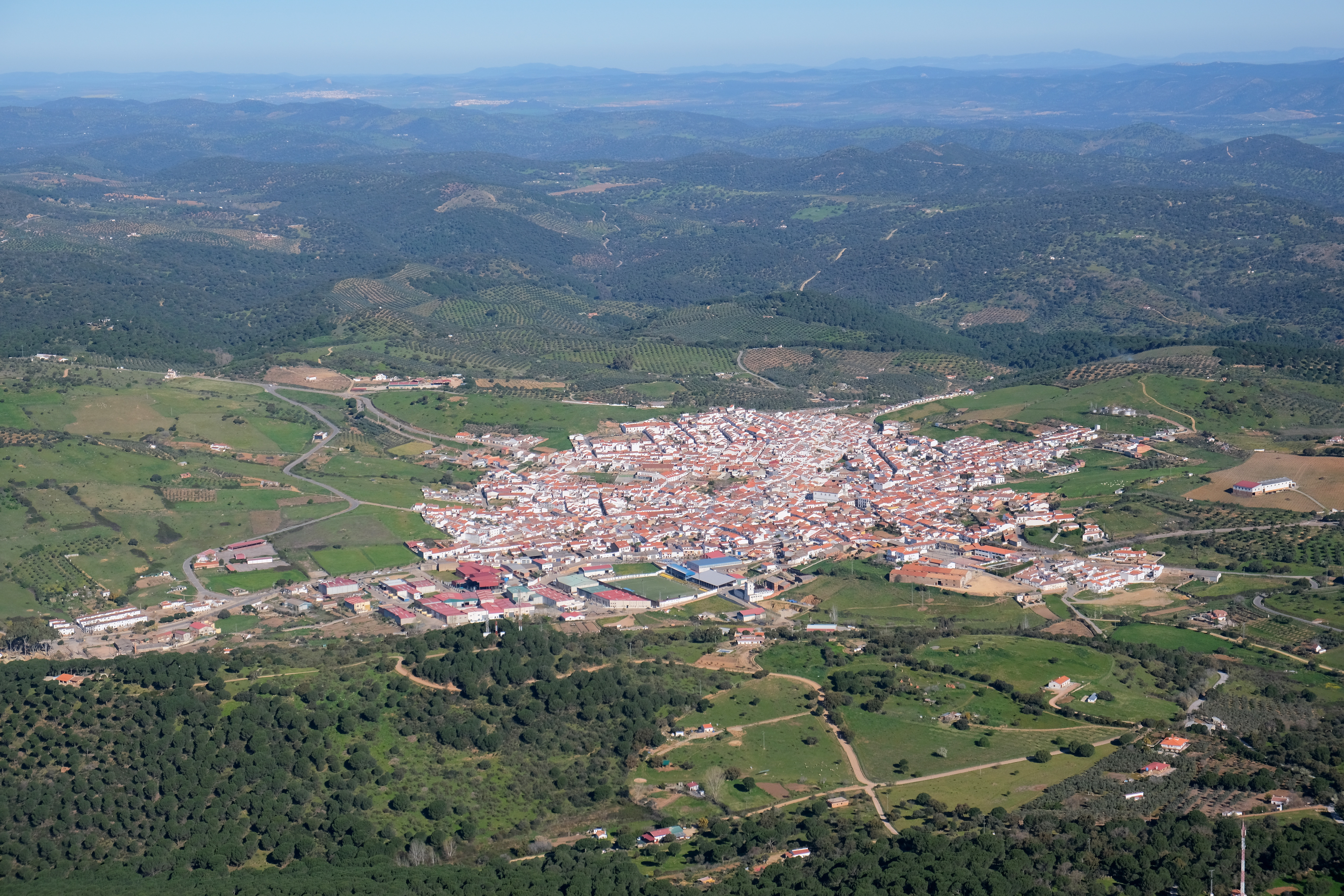

- Seal

- Location in Spain.
- Coordinates: 38°04′N 5°00′W
- Country: Spain
- Autonomous community: Andalusia
- Province: Córdoba
- Municipality: Villaviciosa de Córdoba

Government
  - Mayor: Josefa Soto Murillo

Area
  - Total: 468.75 km^{2} (180.99 sq mi)
- Elevation: 693 m (2,274 ft)

Population (2025-01-01)
  - Total: 3,043
  - Density: 6.492/km^{2} (16.81/sq mi)
- Demonym: Villaviciosanos
- Time zone: UTC+1 (CET)
  - Summer (DST): UTC+2 (CEST)

Villaviciosa de Córdoba is a municipality of Spain located in the province of Córdoba, in the autonomous community of Andalusia.

The municipality spans across a total area of 468.75 km^{2}.

== See also ==
- List of municipalities in Córdoba
