= Sierra Norte de Sevilla (disambiguation) =

Sierra Norte de Sevilla may refer to various places in Spain:

- Sierra Norte de Sevilla, a mountain range of the Sierra Morena system
- Sierra Norte de Sevilla (Vino de la Tierra), a Spanish geographical indication for Vino de la Tierra wines
- Sierra Norte de Sevilla Comarca, a comarca in Sevilla Province, see Comarcas of Spain
