= Guadalimar =

River in Spain

Coordinates: 37°59′N 3°44′W

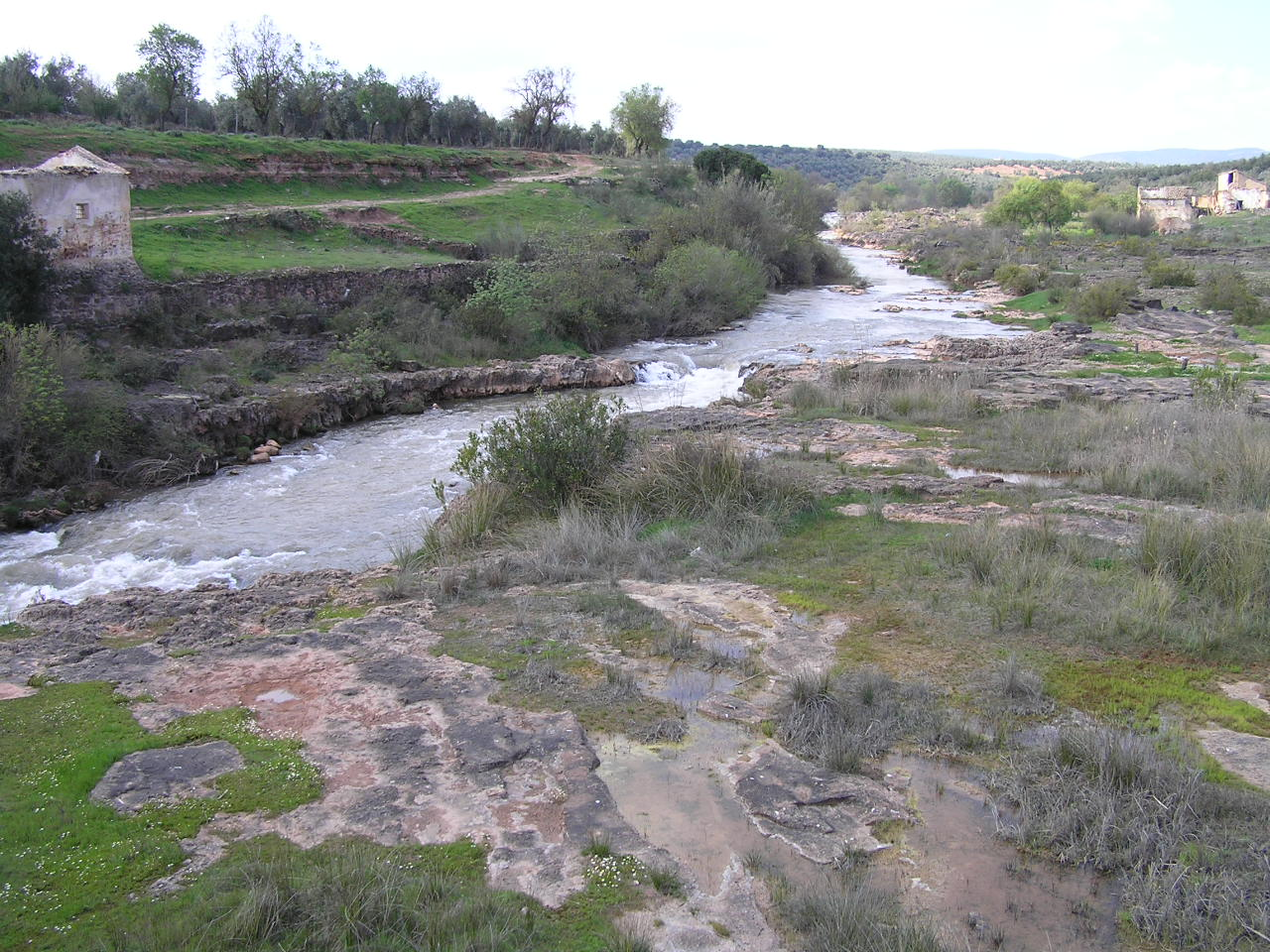

Location
- Country: Spain

Physical characteristics
- Source
  - location: Villaverde de Guadalimar
- Mouth
  - location: Jabalquinto
- Length: 180 km (110 mi)
- Basin size: 5,226 km^{2} (2,018 sq mi)

Basin features
- Progression: Guadalquivir→ Gulf of Cádiz

The Guadalimar (Spanish pronunciation: [ɡwaðaliˈmaɾ]) is a river of the Iberian Peninsula, a right-bank tributary of the Guadalquivir. Its 180-km long course spans across the Spanish provinces of Albacete and Jaén.

The river's main tributaries are the Guadalmena, the Giribaile and the Guadalén.

The hydronym comes from the Arabic al-Wādī-l-aḥmar (الوادي الأحمر 'the red river').
