= Sierra Norte de Sevilla (Vino de la Tierra) =

Sierra Norte de Sevilla VdlT
- Wine region
- Sierra Norte de Sevilla VdlT in the province of Seville in the region of Andalusia
- Type: Vino de la Tierra
- Country: Spain

The Sierra Norte de Sevilla VdlT region, in Andalusia.

Sierra Norte de Sevilla is a Spanish geographical indication for Vino de la Tierra wines located in the Sierra Norte de Sevilla range of the Sierra Morena, Andalusia, southern Spain. Vino de la Tierra is one step below the mainstream Denominación de Origen indication on the Spanish wine quality ladder.

The area covered by this geographical indication comprises the municipalities of Cazalla de la Sierra, Constantina, Seville, Guadalcanal and Alanís, in the province of Seville.

It acquired its Vino de la Tierra status in 2004.

== Grape varieties ==
- White: Chardonnay, Pedro Ximénez, Palomino, Moscatel de Alejandría, Colombard and Sauvignon blanc
- Red: Garnacha tinta, Cabernet Sauvignon, Cabernet Franc, Merlot, Pinot noir, Petit Verdot and Syrah
