= Guadalcanal, Seville =

Guadalcanal
- Municipality
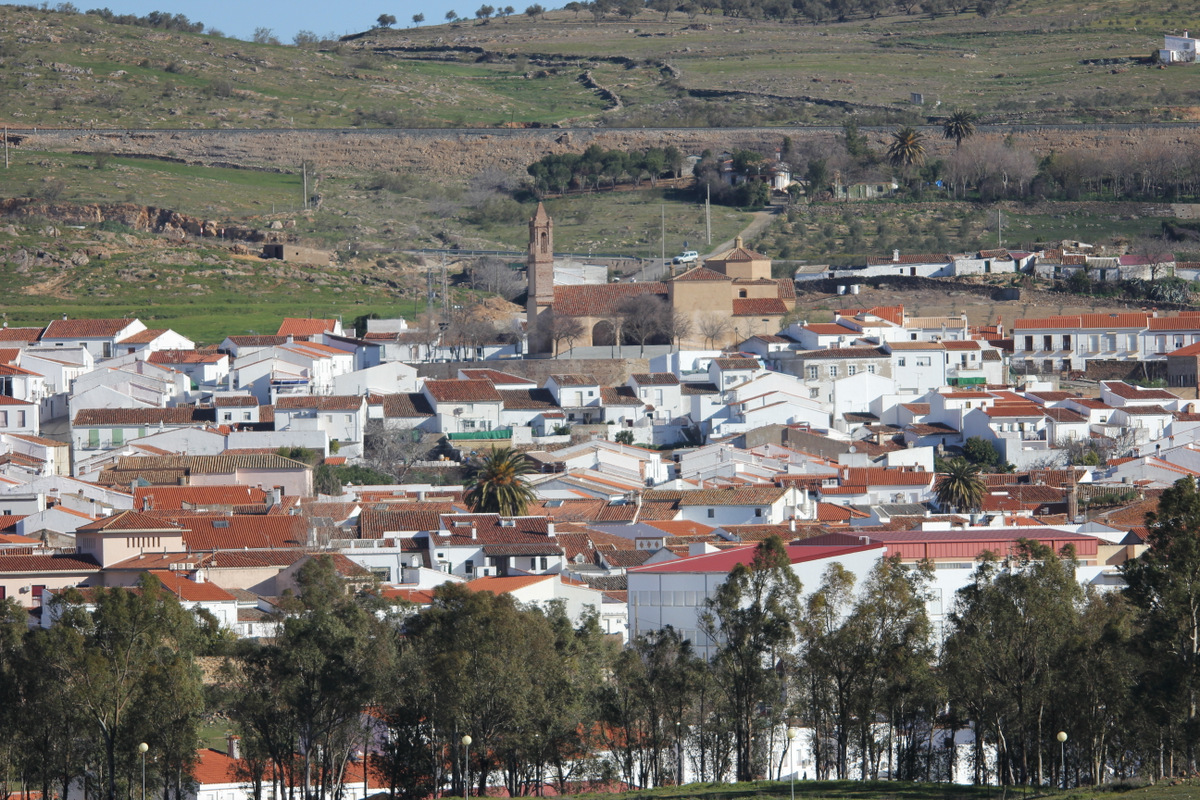

- Coat of arms

- Location within Province of Seville Location within Andalusia Location within Spain
- Coordinates: 38°05′N 5°49′W
- Country: Spain
- Autonomous community: Andalusia
- Province: Seville
- Comarca: Sierra Norte de Sevilla

Population (2025-01-01)
  - Total: 2,544

Guadalcanal (Spanish pronunciation: [ɡwaðalkaˈnal]) is a village in the province of Seville, in the autonomous community of Andalusia, Spain.

The name was given to the island of Guadalcanal in the Solomon Islands in 1568. The name was chosen by Pedro de Ortega Valencia who had been born in the village. He was a subordinate of Spanish explorer and navigator Álvaro de Mendaña de Neira.

== Location and population ==
In 2006 there were 2,970 inhabitants. It has an area of 275 square kilometres and a population density of 10,6 people per square-km. It is at an altitude of 662 metres, in a valley between the Sierra del Agua and the Sierra del Viento, in the region of the Sierra Norte of Seville. Guadalcanal is 80 kilometres north of Seville, it depends to the judicial party of Cazalla de la Sierra.

== Etymology ==
The name, etymologically, comes from the Arabic phrase وَادِي الْقَنَالْ wādī al-qanāl, meaning 'river of the stalls' or 'valley of stalls', referring to the refreshment stalls set up there during the Muslim rule in Andalusia. Other names were Tereses or Tereja, or Canani with the Iberians.

== History ==
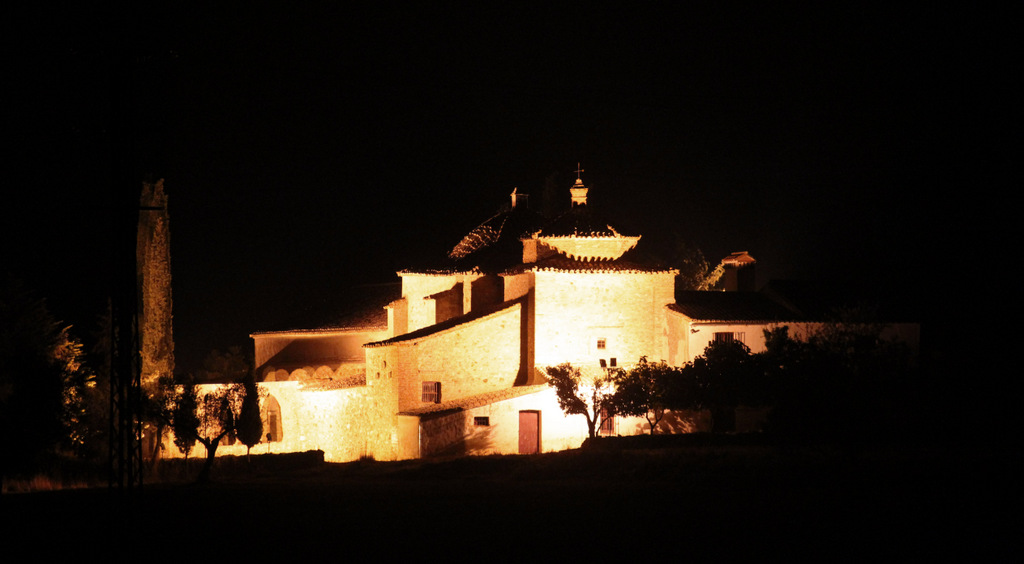
Ermita de San Benito.

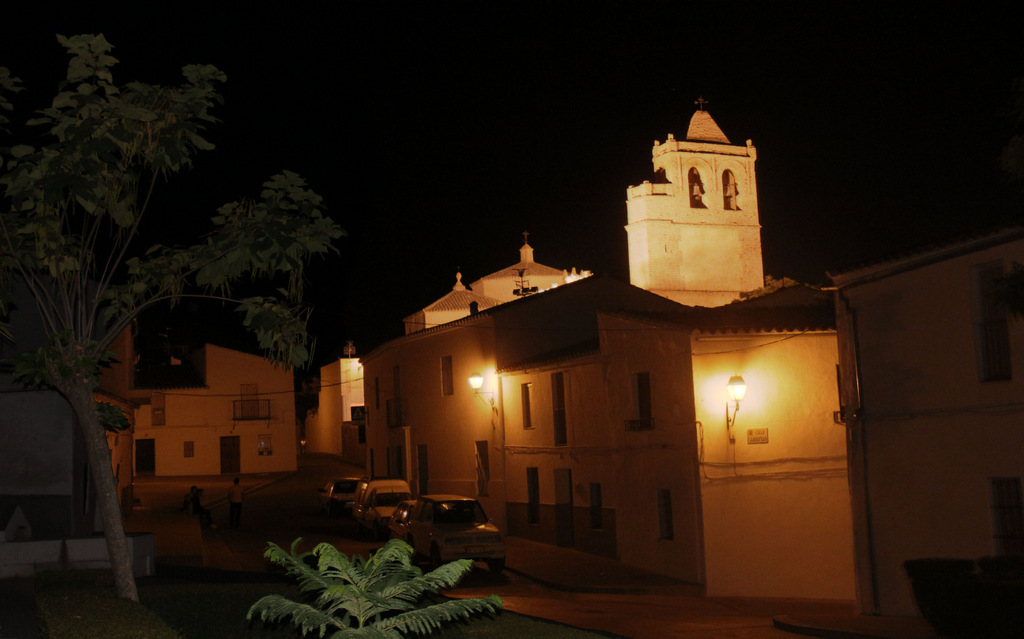
Guadalcanal. Iglesia de Santa Ana.

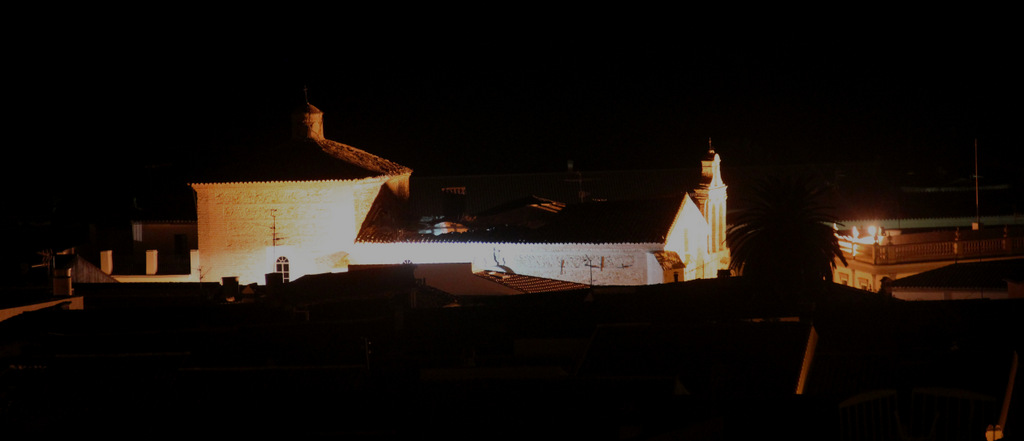
Guadalcanal. Iglesia de la Concepción.

It was reconquered by the Order of Santiago in 1241 from the Moors, then Guadalcanal belonged to the Kingdom of León as well as other parts of Extremadura. In ecclesiastical terms, it belonged to the Santa María de Tendudia vicary.

Guadalcanal was fortified by means of a now-ruined wall which was demolished because the village took part in the Guerra de las Comunidades de Castilla.

In the mid-16th century, the area had some silver mines financed by the Fugger family.

The village suffered a crisis in the 19th century, which caused the four nunneries in the village to close. As other rural communities in Spain, it faced a massive exodus of its inhabitants to the cities in the 20th century.

== See also ==
- List of municipalities in Seville
