= Sierra Norte =

Sierra Norte may refer to:

Mexico:

- Sierra Norte de Puebla, in the state of Puebla
- Sierra Norte de Oaxaca, in the state of Oaxaca

Spain:

- Sierra Norte de Sevilla, a mountain range of the Sierra Morena system
- Parque Natural Sierra Norte de Sevilla
- Sierra Norte, Guadalajara, a comarca in the province of Guadalajara
- Sierra Norte, Jaén, a comarca in the province of Jaén
- Sierra Norte, Madrid, a comarca near Madrid
- Sierra Norte Comarca, Sevilla, a comarca in the province of Seville
