= Marcos Rodríguez Pantoja =

Spanish feral child (1946–2026)

- Born: 7 June 1946; Añora, Andalusia, Spain
- Died: 15 August 2026 (aged 80)
- Occupation: Herder
- Known for: Being a feral child who lived with wolves in the forest

Marcos Rodríguez Pantoja (Note: In this Spanish name, the first or paternal surname is Rodríguez and the second or maternal family name is Pantoja.) (7 June 1946 – 15 August 2026) was a Spanish feral child. He was sold to a hermitic goatherder at seven and after the goatherder's death, he lived alone with the wolves in the Sierra Morena. At 19, he was returned to civilization, but had difficulty adjusting. Gabriel Janer Manila went on to write a PhD thesis about his case, which was titled He jugado con lobos (English: "I Have Played with Wolves").

Rodríguez Pantoja was the subject of the 2010 film Entrelobos (English title: Among Wolves), in which he appears briefly.

In March 2018, he gave an interview in which he said he was disappointed in human nature and wished he could return to the mountains and leave society.

== Biography ==
Marcos Rodríguez Pantoja was born in Añora, in the Spanish province of Córdoba. He migrated with his parents to Madrid, where his mother died giving birth to her eighth child, who died shortly thereafter when Marcos was three years old. His father then married another woman who already had a child from a previous marriage. His stepmother subjected him to cruel abuse while she was in charge. In the 1950s, they settled in Fuencaliente, Ciudad Real, in the Sierra Morena, where they dedicated themselves to the manufacture of charcoal.

By 1954, Marcos had spent much of his young life being abused by his stepmother. That year, aged seven, he was sold or delivered to a local landowner who put him under the care of a goat shepherd. The child was to serve as a future replacement for the shepherd, but was abandoned to nature after the shepherd's death.

In 1965, the Civil Guard found him after eleven years living in complete isolation from human beings and with the sole company of the wolves. The Civil Guard moved him to Fuencaliente by force, bound and gagged, as he howled and bit like a wolf. The police never brought charges against the father, who was still alive at the time, and when he recognized his son, he only reproached him for having lost his jacket.

Nuns employed at a nearby hospital, along with a priest, taught him, again, the use of speech, how to dress, walk upright, and eat with cutlery. He was admitted to the Hospital de Convalecientes of the Vallejo Foundation in Madrid, until he was reintroduced as an adult to life in society. He was sent to Mallorca, where he lived in a hostel, paying for his work.

He did military service and dedicated himself to working as a shepherd and in the hospitality industry. Some of his acquaintances took advantage of him financially very often through scamming and deception, as he suffered from having limited financial and cultural sense, given the many years he spent in complete isolation. After unstable living arrangements in Fuengirola, Málaga, where for a time he even lived in a cave, he moved to a village in the interior of Ourense, Rante. There, he was welcomed by Manuel Barandela Losada, a retired police officer. Marcos called him the jefe and considered him to be family until Barandela's death.

Up until his death, Marcos was sponsored by a Dutch family, and was frequently invited by city councils, associations and diverse organizations to give talks and narrate his experience. He was interviewed on numerous television programs.

Rodríguez Pantoja died on 15 August 2026, at the age of 80.

== Case study ==
The study of the case was carried out by anthropologist and writer Gabriel Janer Manila, who, between November 1975 and April 1976, interviewed Rodríguez in order to study the educational measures necessary for integration into society. Manila stated that the causes of Rodríguez's abandonment were not fortuitous, but deliberate and the result of a socio-economic context of extreme poverty.

The researcher stressed that Rodríguez's survival was possible thanks to the basic skills acquired in the previous phase of his abandonment, as well as his extraordinary natural intelligence. During his isolation, the child learned the noises of the animals with which he lived and used them to communicate with them, while little by little, he abandoned human language.

Once he was again immersed in a social environment, after his rescue by the Civil Guard, he made a slow readaptation to human customs (food, clothing, language, etc.). He had an adulthood preference for life in the field and for animals, with which he had a special understanding. He developed some animosity for the noise and smell of cities, considering that life with humans is worse than life with animals. He considered that the hardships he suffered once he was reintroduced into society could have been alleviated in large part if the State had intervened in time.

== See also ==
- Genie, American feral child
- List of solved missing person cases (1950–1969)
- Oxana Malaya, Ukrainian feral child
- Shaun Ellis, Wolf researcher
