= Fuencaliente =

Fuencaliente may refer to:

- Fuencaliente, Ciudad Real, a municipality located in province of Ciudad Real, in the autonomous community Castile-La Mancha, Spain.
- Fuencaliente de La Palma, a municipality in the southern part of the island La Palma in the province of Santa Cruz de Tenerife, in the autonomous community of the Canary Islands, Spain.
- Fuencaliente Lighthouse, an active lighthouse in the municipality of Fuencaliente de La Palma.
