= Our Lady of Cabeza =

Marian apparition and statue

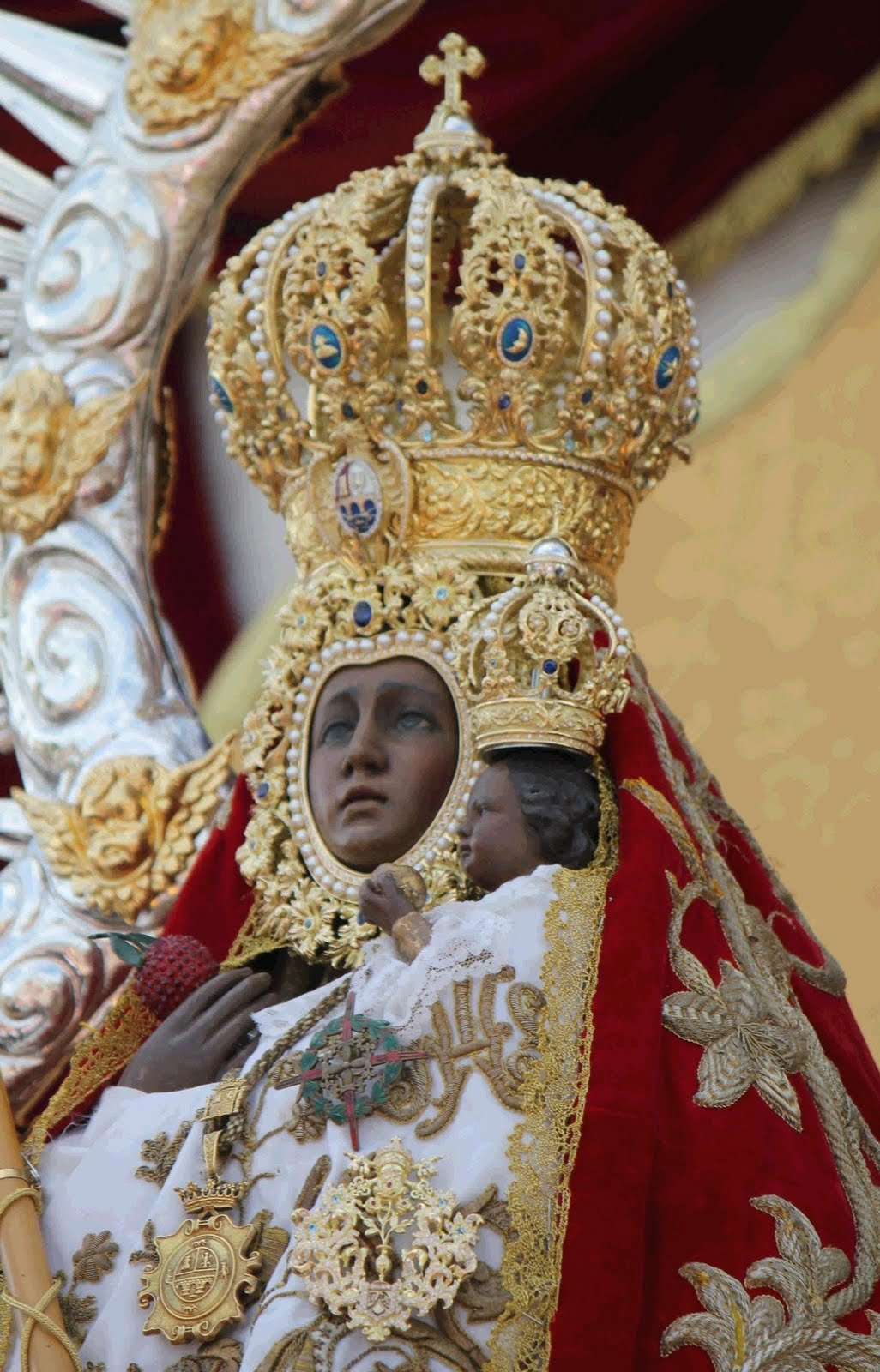
- Location: Cerro del Cabezo, Spain
- Witness: Juan Alonso de Rivas
- Type: Marian apparition
- Shrine: Basilica of Nuestra Señora de la Cabeza, near Andújar, Spain

Our Lady of Cabeza (Spanish: Nuestra Señora de la Cabeza, La Santísima Virgen de la Cabeza, Virgen de la Cabeza, Nuestra Señora la Virgen de la Cabeza) is a Marian apparition and statue of the Madonna and Child, whose cult is centered at the Basilica of Nuestra Señora de la Cabeza, located in the Natural Park of the Sierra of Andújar, 32 km north of the city of Andújar, Spain. A Black Madonna, she is known popularly as La Morenita (“Little brunette”).

She is one of the patron saints of Andújar (the other is Saint Euphrasius) and the diocese of Jaén. Her name refers to the Cerro del Cabezo ridge where she is said to have appeared. She was declared patroness of Andújar by Pope Pius X on 18 March 1909 and of the Diocese of Jaén by Pope John XXIII on 27 November 1959.

She is also known to be the patron of monterías, which are traditional driven hunts in Spain.

== Legend ==
According to the legend, when Saint Euphrasius came to Spain in the first century, he brought with him an image of the Virgin Mary to which he showed devotion. According to the legend, this image was given to Euphrasius by Saint Peter, and is said to have been the portrait that Saint Luke painted of the Virgin Mary (The original polychrome image itself, based on its artistic style, may have actually dated from the fifth century.)

In the 8th century, when Andujar was occupied by Moorish forces, the image was hidden atop one of the highest and inaccessible hills of the Sierra Morena, the Cerro del Cabezo. In the thirteenth century, a shepherd named Juan Alonso de Rivas, from Colomera, was watching over the livestock belonging to a neighbor from Arjona. Rivas was an elderly Christian, suffering from anchylosis and paralysis in his left arm.

One night, Rivas began to see strange lights at the top of the Cerro del Cabezo. He also heard the incessant sounds of a bell. He climbed the hill and there, between two enormous blocks of granite, found a small image of the Virgin Mary. Rivas knelt before the image, which spoke to him, asking him to build a church at this spot. Rivas found that his left arm had been cured, and he went down to the city of Andújar to describe what had happened to him.

== Veneration ==
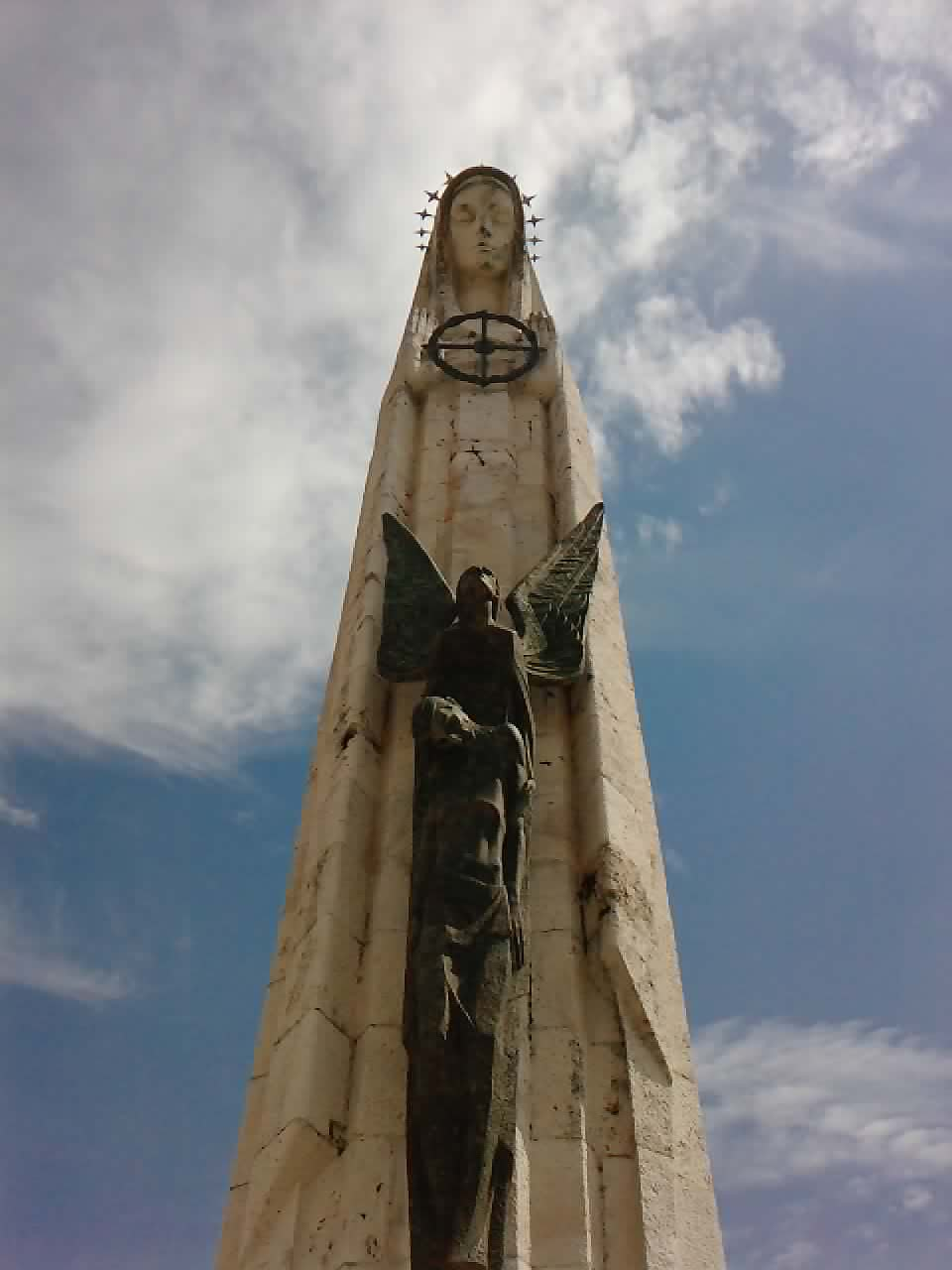
Statue of Our Lady of Cabeza near the Basilica of Nuestra Señora de la Cabeza.

The cultus of Our Lady of Cabeza spread beyond Andújar. A sanctuary-church was dedicated to her at Motril, began in 1631. Though partially destroyed in the Spanish Civil War, it was subsequently rebuilt. There is a church dedicated to Our Lady of Cabeza at Ávila, dating from the early 13th century, and in South America, a church was dedicated to her at Lima, Peru, in the Rímac District. Miguel de Cervantes describes the shrine dedicated to Our Lady of Cabeza in his Los Trabajos de Persiles y Sigismunda.

The Pilgrimage of the Virgen de la Cabeza is celebrated at Andújar on the last Sunday of the month of April. During this pilgrimage, the faithful visit the sanctuary on the hill of the Cabezo. A local fair (feria) is also celebrated in September, associated with cattle-raising, but this aspect has diminished in recent years. Despite this, the fair still features stands and booths erected for the sale of cattle and livestock.

Pope Benedict XVI conferred on Our Lady of Cabeza a Golden Rose on 22 November 2009, the first Marian image in Spain to receive this award. A request for the honor had been made by the bishop of Jaén, Ramón del Hoyo López, due to the fact that the diocese was celebrating the centenary of the image's coronation. The Latin inscription on the Golden Rose reads: "Benedict XVI. Golden Rose. For the image of the Blessed Virgen de la Cabeza, Heavenly Patroness of the Diocese of Jaen. Most gracious concession. 22 November 2009."
