= Andújar =

- Municipality
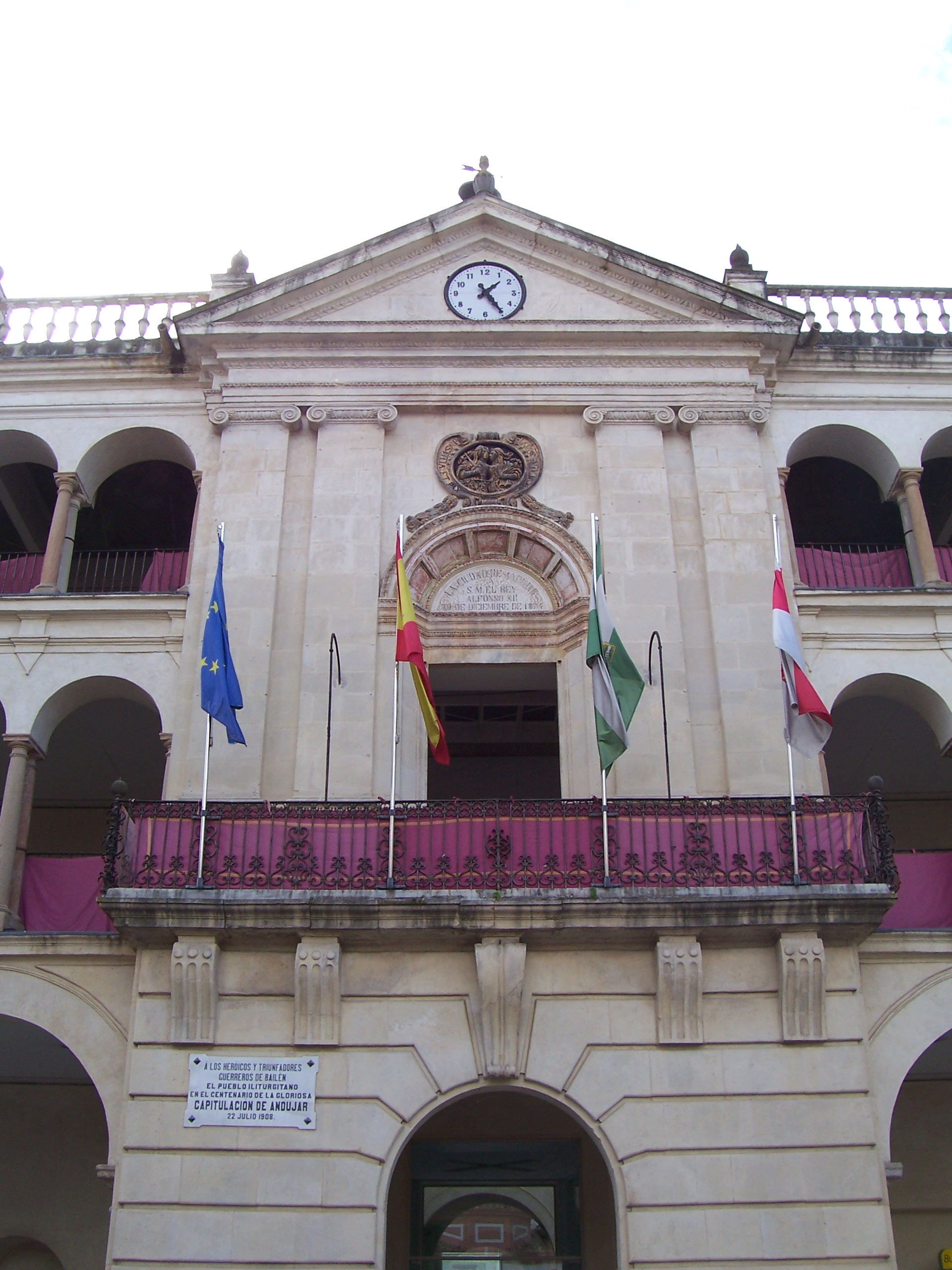
- City Hall of Andújar

- Flag Coat of arms

- Location in the Province of Jaén Location in Andalusia Location in Spain
- Coordinates: 38°2′21.25″N 4°3′2.02″W
- Country: Spain
- Autonomous community: Andalusia
- Province: Jaén
- Comarca: Campiña de Jaén

Government
  - Body: Ayuntamiento de Andújar
  - Mayor: Francisco Manuel Huertas Delgado (PSOE-A)

Area
  - Total: 9,649 km^{2} (3,725 sq mi)
- Elevation: 212 m (696 ft)

Population (2025-01-01)
  - Total: 35,610
  - Density: 3,936/km^{2} (10,190/sq mi)
- Demonyms: Andujareño/a, iliturgitano/a
- Time zone: UTC+1 (CET)
  - Summer (DST): CEST
- Postal code: 23740
- Official language(s): Spanish
- Website: Official website

Andújar (Spanish pronunciation: [anˈduxaɾ]) is a Spanish municipality of 35,619 people (2024) in the province of Jaén, in Andalusia. The municipality is divided by the Guadalquivir River. The northern part of the municipality is where the Natural Park of the Sierra de Andújar is situated. To the south are agricultural fields and countryside. The city proper located on the right bank of the Guadalquivir and the Madrid-Córdoba railway. In the past, Andújar was widely known for its porous earthenware jars, called alcarrazas or botijos, which keep water cool in the hottest weather, and were manufactured from a whitish clay found in the neighbourhood.

== History ==
=== Antiquity ===
Paleolithic artifacts have been found in the area, associated with the Acheulean Culture, but it is during the Neolithic Age when the area became increasingly populated, with agriculture being developed in the fertile land, and mining activities beginning in the Sierra Morena.

According to archaeological studies, the first people who inhabited the area where the Oretani, an Iberian people, who founded in the area the town of Isturgi, today occupied by the hamlet of Los Villares de Andújar.

Isturgi should not be identified with the ancient town of Illiturgis, which was situated on the hill called Máquiz (Mengíbar). Nevertheless, iliturgitano is used to describe an inhabitant of Andújar. Isturgi had contact with various peoples: Turdetani, Phoenicians, Greeks, Carthaginians, and other towns, such as Obulco (Porcuna) and Castulo.

During the times of the Roman Empire, the Municipium Isturgi Triumphale was part of the province of Hispania Ulterior and then Hispania Baetica and the area known as the Conventus Cordubensis. It flourished due to its production of Terra sigillata and its location on the Guadalquivir. After the fall of the Roman Empire, it existed as a Visigothic town named Sturgi. But with the invasion of the Moors in the 8th century, the population fled to what are now the actual limits of the town of Andújar, where they may have already existed an Ibero-Roman settlement.

=== Medieval era ===
In 711 AD, after the Battle of Guadalete, the entire region became part of Al-Andalus, and the town of Andújar first became known as Anduyar during the emirate of Muhammad I of Córdoba (853). The city was fortified by the Almohads during the 12th century. In 1225, the Muslim king of Baeza handed over the castles of Jaén, Andújar and Martos, to Ferdinand III of Castile, although some scholars believe the transfer occurred at a different time, especially as the siege of Jaen in 1225 was unsuccessful and was thus still in Muslim hands in this year. Ferdinand was entrusted with the fortresses, and control was given to Álvaro Pérez de Castro, with the area occupied by troops from the military orders of Santiago and Calatrava. Andújar became a rendezvous point for Christian troops and armies who fought south of the Sierra Morena. The Muslim inhabitants of Andújar, Martos, and Baeza abandoned these towns at the end of 1226.

In 1227, the first Christian inhabitants arrived at Baeza, Andújar and Martos, although some sources indicate that the repopulation of Andújar did not occur until 1228. In 1467, the title of City was granted to Andújar by Henry IV of Castile.

=== Modern times ===
During the Napoleonic Wars, the city was occupied by French troops in 1808. General Pierre Dupont de l'Étang, after conquering Córdoba, established his HQ at Andújar. From Andújar Dupont sent troops to Bailén, where he lost the battle there. After this battle, the capitulations were signed at Andújar in the Palace of Gracia Real.

In 1835, the first Junta de Soberanía Central de Andalucía (Junta of Central Sovereignty of Andalusia) was established at Andújar; it is considered the pioneer of the autonomist movement in Andalusia. In 1873, Andújar was declared a federal canton.

During the Spanish Civil War, Republican forces besieged a Nationalist force, led by Captain Santiago Cortés González, that had taken refuge in the Basilica of Our Lady of Cabeza. The Siege of Santuario de Nuestra Señora de la Cabeza lasted eight months.

== Climate ==
Andújar has a Mediterranean climate (Csa) with very hot, dry summers and mild wet winters. Located in the east of the Guadalquivir valley, it has winters very similar to those observed in Córdoba and colder than in Seville due to its location further inland. Summers are extremely hot, often with average highs exceeding 37.5 °C (100 °F) for the period 1981-2010. Andújar, together with the municipalities of Montoro and Marmolejo, appear to have, on average, the highest average maximum temperatures in Europe during the summer.

Climate data for Andújar
Month	Jan	Feb	Mar	Apr	May	Jun	Jul	Aug	Sep	Oct	Nov	Dec	Year
Mean daily maximum °C (°F)	15.8 (60.4)	18.0 (64.4)	22.0 (71.6)	23.8 (74.8)	28.2 (82.8)	34.0 (93.2)	37.8 (100.0)	37.2 (99.0)	32.4 (90.3)	26.0 (78.8)	19.9 (67.8)	16.4 (61.5)	26.0 (78.7)
Daily mean °C (°F)	9.5 (49.1)	11.2 (52.2)	14.4 (57.9)	16.2 (61.2)	20.0 (68.0)	25.0 (77.0)	28.0 (82.4)	27.6 (81.7)	23.9 (75.0)	18.7 (65.7)	13.5 (56.3)	10.5 (50.9)	18.2 (64.8)
Mean daily minimum °C (°F)	3.1 (37.6)	4.4 (39.9)	6.7 (44.1)	8.5 (47.3)	11.7 (53.1)	15.9 (60.6)	18.2 (64.8)	18.0 (64.4)	15.3 (59.5)	11.3 (52.3)	7.0 (44.6)	4.6 (40.3)	10.4 (50.7)
Average precipitation mm (inches)	57.4 (2.26)	50.9 (2.00)	41.3 (1.63)	55.2 (2.17)	38.8 (1.53)	12.8 (0.50)	3.3 (0.13)	5.6 (0.22)	26.2 (1.03)	63.2 (2.49)	75.1 (2.96)	91.8 (3.61)	521.6 (20.53)
Source: World Meteorological Organization

== Local holidays and customs ==
Its Christian patron saints are the Virgen de la Cabeza and St. Euphrasius of Illiturgis.

The most well-known local holiday is the Pilgrimage of the Virgen de la Cabeza, celebrated on the last Sunday of the month of April. During this pilgrimage, the faithful visit the sanctuary on the hill of the Cabezo. The local legend states that on the night of August 12, 1227, a shepherd from Colomera named Juan Alonso de Rivas was watching over the livestock belonging to a neighbor from Arjona when he began to see strange lights at the top of a hill. He also heard the incessant sounds of a bell. He climbed the hill and there found the image of the Virgen de la Cabeza.

A local fair (feria) is also celebrated in September, associated with cattle-raising, but this aspect has diminished in recent years. Despite this, the fair still features stands and booths erected for the sale of cattle and livestock.

== Sports ==
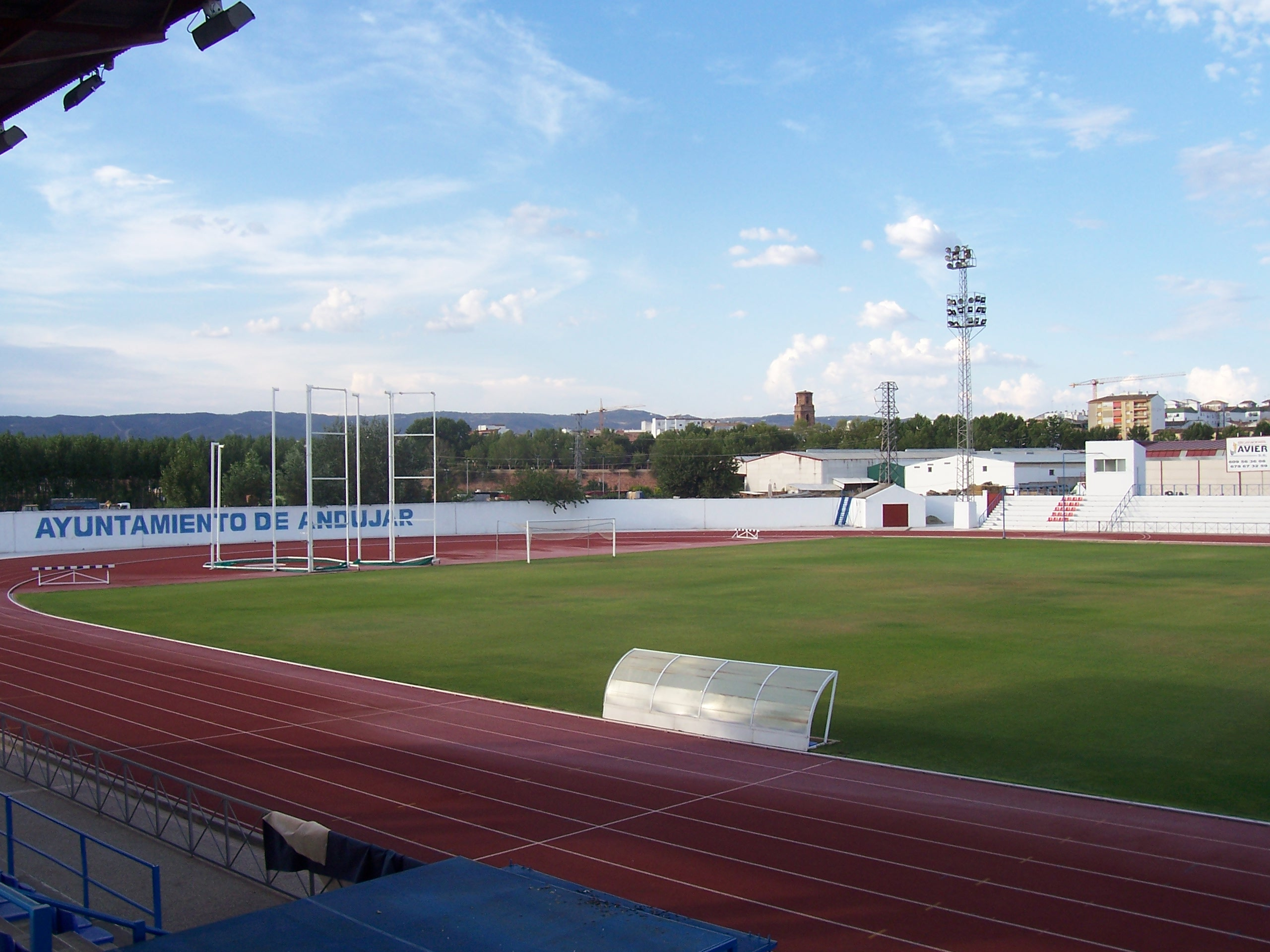
The New Municipal Stadium (Nuevo Estadio Municipal)

The local football (soccer) team is the 80-year-old Club Deportivo Iliturgi, in the third division of the national soccer league. In futsal, the local team is Andújar Fútbol Sala, which is in the First National Division A.

In September 2008, the Paralympic swimmer Miguel Ángel Martínez Tajuelo was the first native of the city to participate in these games, attending the Paralympic Games in Beijing 2008. He won 3 Paralympic awards in the 100 meter race (5th), 50-meter race (6th) and 50 meter backstroke (5th).

== Neighborhoods ==
- Barrio Montañés
- Los Belenes
- Polígono Puerta de Madrid (working class area divided into sector Huelva, sector Almería, sector Sevilla, sector Granada).
- Barrio de la Paz (unofficially known as Barrio de la UVA).
- Barrio San Bartolomé
- Emperadores
- La Pastora
- Las Vistillas
- Cuadro de la Virgen

== Twin towns & sister cities ==
Andújar is twinned with:

- Favara, Italy

== See also ==
- List of municipalities in Jaén
