= Cazalla de la Sierra =

Coordinates: 37°56′N 5°46′W

- Coat of arms

- Location in Spain.
- Country: Spain
- Autonomous community: Andalusia

Area
  - Total: 356.15 km^{2} (137.51 sq mi)
- Elevation: 600 m (2,000 ft)

Population (2025-01-01)
  - Total: 4,626
  - Density: 12.99/km^{2} (33.64/sq mi)
- Time zone: UTC+1 (CET)
  - Summer (DST): UTC+2 (CEST)
- Website: www.cazalladelasierra.es

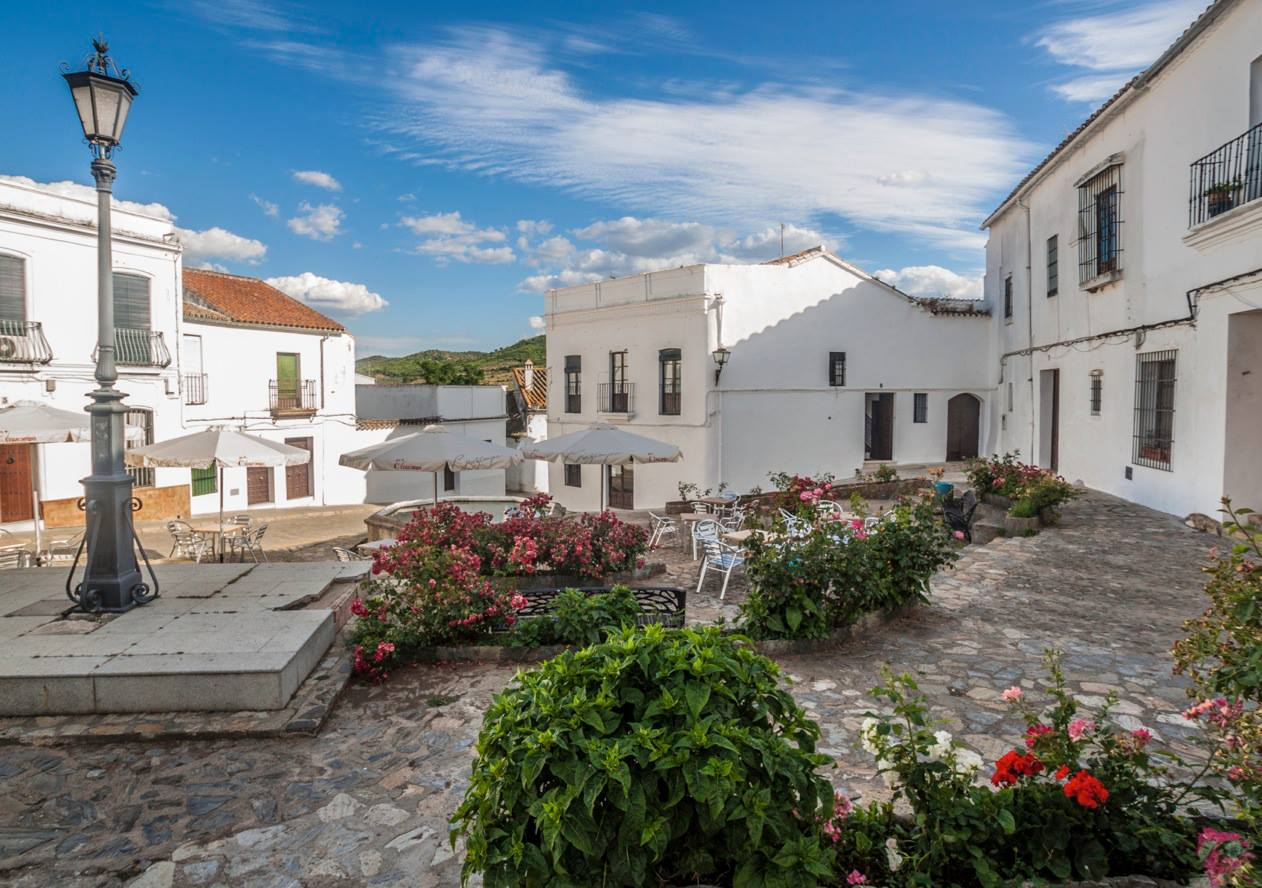
council square

Cazalla de la Sierra is a small town in the province of Seville, in southern Spain. It is located in the foothills of the Sierra Norte de Sevilla, part of the Sierra Morena, which acts as a border between the region of Andalusia and the regions of Extremadura and Castilla-La Mancha.

In 2006, the town had a population of 5,153 inhabitants and an area of 352 km^{2} (136 sq mi). It rests at an altitude of 595 m (1,952 ft) above sea level and is 89 km (55 mi) north of Seville. The local speech of Cazalla, like that of the province's capital but unlike most of the province itself, exhibits seseo.

== Climate ==
Climate data for Cazalla de la Sierra, Spain (2001-2025 averages, 550m above sea level)
Month	Jan	Feb	Mar	Apr	May	Jun	Jul	Aug	Sep	Oct	Nov	Dec	Year
Mean daily maximum °C (°F)	13.8 (56.8)	15.6 (60.1)	17.0 (62.6)	19.3 (66.7)	24.0 (75.2)	29.4 (84.9)	33.6 (92.5)	33.8 (92.8)	28.3 (82.9)	23.1 (73.6)	16.7 (62.1)	14.6 (58.3)	22.4 (72.4)
Mean daily minimum °C (°F)	3.3 (37.9)	4.0 (39.2)	5.8 (42.4)	7.0 (44.6)	9.5 (49.1)	13.2 (55.8)	15.7 (60.3)	16.4 (61.5)	14.1 (57.4)	11.5 (52.7)	6.9 (44.4)	4.7 (40.5)	9.3 (48.8)
Average rainfall mm (inches)	82.0 (3.23)	65.1 (2.56)	104.2 (4.10)	67.7 (2.67)	20.9 (0.82)	16.1 (0.63)	1.2 (0.05)	2.0 (0.08)	51.3 (2.02)	124.5 (4.90)	82.7 (3.26)	94.6 (3.72)	712.3 (28.04)
Source: Météo-France

== See also ==
- List of municipalities in Seville
