= Bañuela =

- La Mójina
- Location within Spain

Highest point
- Elevation: 1,332 m (4,370 ft)
- Coordinates: 38°25′14.34″N 4°14′9.29″W

Geography
- Location: Ciudad Real Province (Castile-La Mancha)
- Parent range: Sierra Madrona, Sierra Morena

Climbing
- First ascent: Unknown
- Easiest route: Hike from Fuencaliente

Bañuela or La Bañuela, also known as La Mójina, is the highest peak of the Sierra Morena, Spain.

== Description ==
The mountain is 1,332 m high and it is located in a range known as Sierra de Navalmanzano, part of the Sierra Madrona range, at the southern end of Ciudad Real Province, Castile-La Mancha. It is mostly covered with matorral scrubland where plants such as Cistus, Erica and rosemary predominate.

There is a good hiking route to reach the peak starting from Fuencaliente, but there is no marked path to reach the peak after reaching a certain height. This makes it difficult to find the summit in misty weather. There is a triangulation pillar on the crest, but it is not exactly at the highest point, which is located nearby.

== See also ==
- Geography of Spain
- Geology of the Iberian Peninsula
- Sierra Morena
