= Siege of Santuario de Nuestra Señora de la Cabeza =

Battle occurring during the Spanish Civil War

- Part of the Spanish Civil War
Date	September 14, 1936 – May 1, 1937
Location	Nuestra Señora de la Cabeza Sanctuary, north of Andújar, Jaén, Andalusia, Spain 38°10′44″N 4°02′19″W
Result	Republican victory

Belligerents
(Spain) Spanish Republic: Spanish Republican Army; Spanish Republican Air Force	(Francoist Spain) Nationalist Spain: Guardia Civil; FE de las JONS

Commanders and leaders
Lt. Col. Carlos García Vallejo; Maj. Pedro Martínez Cartón	Cpt. Santiago Cortés (DOW); Lt. Francisco Ruano Beltrán (POW)

Strength
September 1936: 1,500 soldiers and militiamen May 1937: 6,000–12,000 soldiers 15 T-26 tanks	September 1936: 165 Guardia Civil gendarmes 72 FE de las JONS volunteers 870–887 civilians

Casualties and losses
	150 dead, 250 wounded

The siege of Santuario de Nuestra Señora de la Cabeza took place from 14 September 1936 to 1 May 1937 in Andújar, Jaén, during the Spanish Civil War. The Republican army surrounded around 1,200 rebel civil guards and falangists who supported the Nationalists and forced them to surrender after a protracted offensive.

== Background ==
After the failed coup of July 1936 in Andalusia, many groups of rebel civil guards retreated from their garrisons to hilltops, monasteries and others easily defensible points, living by robbing from the neighborhood. The longest surviving group of rebels was the encampment of the Nuestra Señora de la Cabeza's Sanctuary.

== The siege ==
In August 1936, 250 civil guards from Jaén, most of their families, 100 falangists and about 1,000 members of the bourgeoisie of Andújar (Beevor: around 1,200 civil guards and falangists), retreated to the Nuestra Señora de la Cabeza's shrine, near Andújar. During the first months of the war, there had been no attack launched against this enclave, because the Republican committee of Andújar did not know that the civil guards of the shrine were rebels. After gathering a good supply of food, the civil guards decided to send a declaration of war to the committee in September 1936. Their commander, Major Nofuentes, who wanted to surrender, was deposed by captain Santiago Cortés and the Republicans started the siege. Nationalist aircraft from Córdoba and Seville dropped supplies into the encampment (160,000 pounds of food from Seville and 140,000 pounds from Córdoba). Medical supplies and delicate goods were attached to live turkeys. Furthermore, pigeons sent news and messages to the Nationalists in Seville.

In December 1936, Queipo de Llano launched an offensive in order to occupy Andújar and relieve the shrine, but the offensive was stopped at Lopera in January 1937 (20 milles away from Andújar). In April 1937, the Republican government decided to crush the resistance of the rebels and sent a large force (20,000 men), led by communist major Martínez Cartón. The Republican forces split the rebel enclave in two and conquered the encampment of Lugar Nuevo. Franco then gave permission to Cortés to evacuate women and children and to surrender should resistance become impossible, but Cortés rejected the evacuation of the women and children. On April 30, Cortés was wounded and on May 1, the Republicans broke into the sanctuary.

== Aftermath ==
The remaining rebels were taken prisoner and Cortés died of wounds in hospital. The rebels received little recognition in Nationalist Spain.

== See also ==
- List of Spanish Republican military equipment of the Spanish Civil War
- List of Spanish National military equipment of the Spanish Civil War
