= Sierra Madrona =

Mountain range in Spain

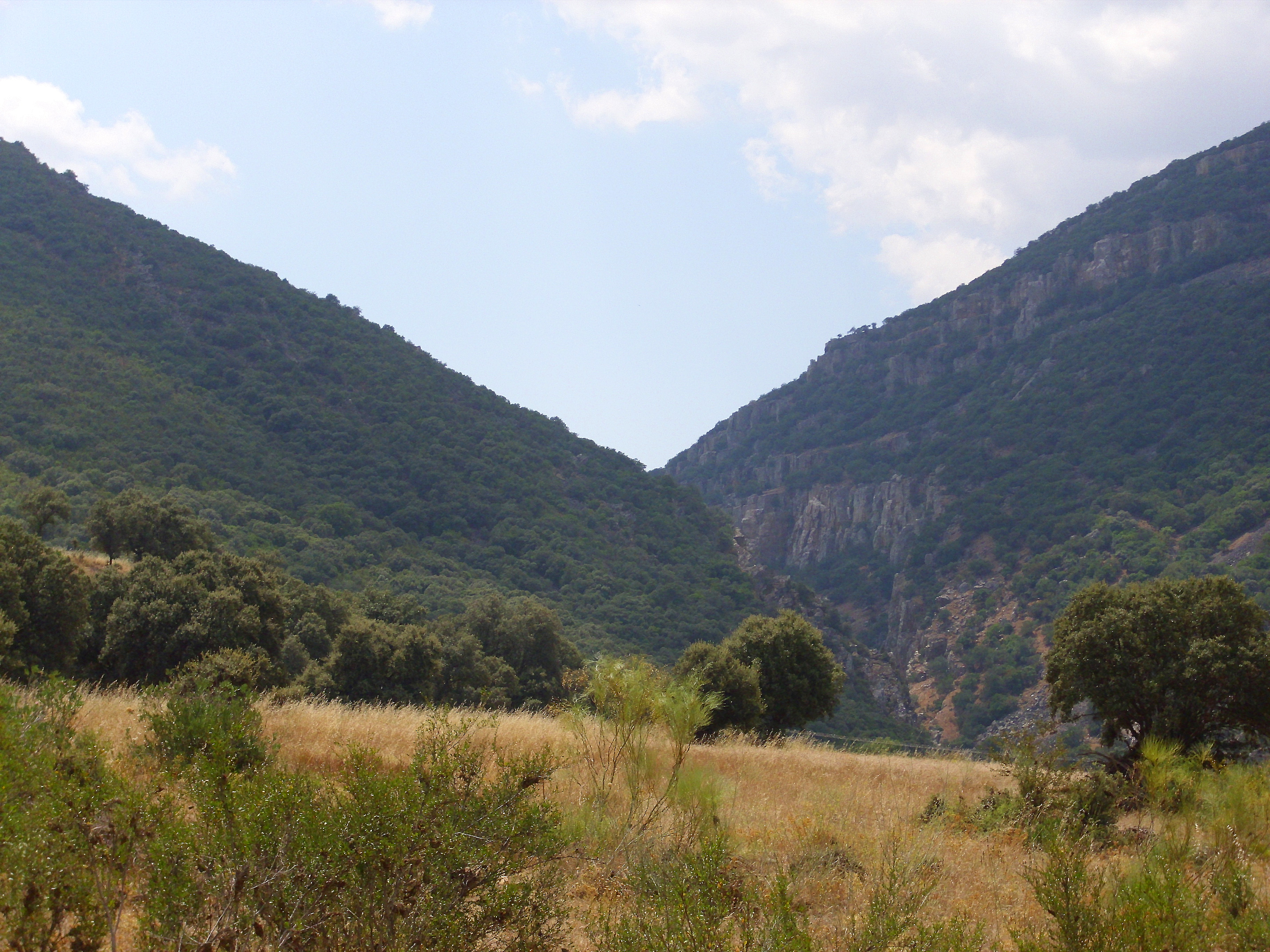
- Jandula Canyon, Sierra Madrona

Highest point
- Peak: Bañuela
- Elevation: 1,332 m (4,370 ft)
- Coordinates: 38°26′18″N 4°9′55″W

Dimensions
- Length: 33 km (21 mi) NW/SE
- Width: 6.5 km (4.0 mi) NE/SW

Geography
- Location within Spain
- Location: Castile-La Mancha and Andalusia, Spain
- Country: Spain
- Parent range: Sierra Morena

Geology
- Orogeny: Variscan orogeny
- Rock age: Paleozoic
- Rock type(s): Schist, slate and quartzite

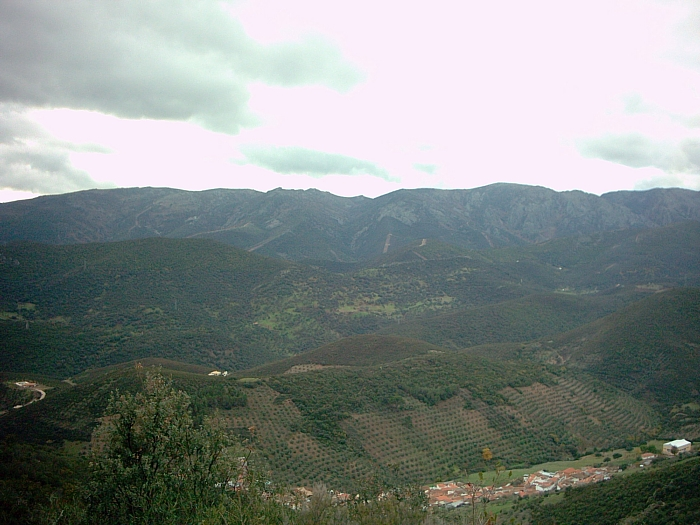
Sierra Madrona view from Los Rehoyos; at the bottom of the photo is a glimpse of Solana del Pino

Sierra Madrona is a mountain range of the Sierra Morena, Spain. It is located in Ciudad Real Province, in the region of Castile-La Mancha as well as the Córdoba and Jaén provincial limits, Andalusia.

Its highest peak, 1,332 m high Bañuela, is the highest point of the whole Sierra Morena system. Other notable summits are Dormideros 1,328 m, Corral de Borros 1,312 m, Abulagoso 1,301 m and Rebollera 1,161 m.

== Description ==
Sierra Madrona is a massif composed of a series of subranges including Sierra de Quintana, Sierra de Hornilleros, Sierra de Navalmanzano, Sierra de la Garganta and Sierra del Nacedero. They are aligned in a NW-SE direction and are separated by narrow valleys. The range is bounded by the Robledillo river valley and Sierra de la Solana and Umbria de Alcudia in the North, the Montoro river valley in the East, by the smooth hills of Sierra de Andújar, Sierra Quiteria and Los Pedroches in the South, and by the Yeguas River valley in the West.

The range is mostly covered in shrubland and is named after the madroño or madroña, the Strawberry Tree (Arbutus unedo) which is abundant in the area. The easiest route to reach it is to drive from Andújar or Puertollano.

The cave paintings of Peña Escrita and La Batanera are located in caves within the range area.

=== Geology ===
Geologically the range is made up of Paleozoic schist, slate and quartzite, as well as greywacke and sandstone. Structurally the range comprises a succession of wide anticlines and synclines in a Hercynian WNW-ESE direction.

== See also ==
- Alcudia Valley
- Geography of Spain
- Geology of the Iberian Peninsula
