= Pantoja =

Pantoja may refer to:

== People with Pantoja as first or only surname ==
- Doña Ana de Pantoja, a fictional character in José Zorrilla's play Don Juan Tenorio
- Antonia Pantoja (1922–2002), Puerto Rican educator, social worker, feminist, civil rights leader and founder of the ASPIRA Association, a Hispanic non-profit organization
- Alexandre Pantoja, UFC Fighter
- Cristina Pantoja-Hidalgo (born 1944), award-winning Filipina author
- Diego de Pantoja (1571–1618), Spanish Jesuit and missionary to China who accompanied Matteo Ricci in Beijing
- Dr Dimas Pantoja, a fictional character portrayed by Jorge Enrique Abello in the 1996 production of La Viuda de Blanco
- Dominga Pantoja Nique (1889–2007), Peruvian supercentenarian who was aged 117 years 279 days at her death
- Super Crazy, nickname of Francisco Pantoja Rueda (born 1973), Mexican professional wrestler
- Isabel Pantoja (born 1956), contemporary Spanish singer
- Juan Pantoja de la Cruz (1553–1608), Spanish court painter
- Victor Pantoja, percussionist in the Latin jazz-rock-fusion group Azteca

== People with Pantoja as a Hispanic second surname ==
According to Spanish naming customs, a person's given name is followed by two family names (surnames). Traditionally, the first surname is the father's first surname, and the second is the mother's first surname, but this traditional order is reversible per current gender equality law.

- Alfonso Fernández Pantoja (died 1761), Roman Catholic Bishop of León, Spain (1753–1761)
- Dagoberto Lagos Pantoja, President of the Supreme Court of Chile (1929–1931)
- Marcos Rodríguez Pantoja, a feral child who lived with wolves for 10 years in the mountains of Northern Spain
- Oswaldo Alanis Pantoja (born 1989), Mexican football player
- Alexandre Pantoja, mixed martial artist and UFC flyweight champion.

== Places named Pantoja ==
- Cerro Pantoja, a stratovolcano on the border of Argentina and Chile
- Pantoja, Guanajuato, a village in the Mexican state of Guanajuato
- Pantoja, Peru, a town and garrison in Torres Causana District of the Maynas Province in Peru
- Pantoja, Spain, a municipality in the province of Toledo in the autonomous community of Castile-La Mancha, Spain
- Pantoja Islands, part of the Bligh Island Marine Provincial Park in British Columbia, Canada
- Pantoja Park, a historic landmark located in the city of San Diego, California
- Pantoja district in Santo Domingo, Dominican Republic. The professional soccer team Atlético Pantoja is based here.

== See also ==
- Antonio Pantojas (born 1948), a Puerto Rican actor, comedian, and dancer
