= Oxana Malaya =

Ukrainian feral child

Oksana Malaya
- Born: Oksana Oleksandrivna Malaya; 4 November 1983 (age 43); Nova Blahovishchenka, Ukrainian SSR, Soviet Union
- Known for: Being a Feral child

Oksana Oleksandrivna Malaya (Ukrainian: Оксана Олександрівна Малая, born 4 November 1983), better known as Oxana Malaya, is a Ukrainian woman internationally known for her dog-imitating behavior. Malaya has been the subject of documentaries, interviews and tabloid headlines as a feral child "raised by dogs".

== Biography ==
Malaya was born in the village of Nova Blahovishchenka in Hornostaivka Raion, Kherson Oblast, of the Ukrainian SSR. According to doctors and medical records, she was a normal child at birth, but was later neglected by her drunk father at age three, and she lived surrounded by dogs. When Malaya was found by authorities, she was seven and a half years old, but she could not talk, lacked many basic skills, and physically behaved like a dog. She was running around on all fours, barking, slept on the floor, and she ate and took care of her hygiene like a dog. Malaya was removed from her parents' custody by social services.

Malaya was eventually transferred to the foster home for mentally disabled children in Barabol, in Ovidiopol Raion of Odesa Oblast. She underwent years of specialized therapy and education to address her behavioural, social and educational issues. Upon adulthood, Malaya was taught to subdue her dog-like behaviour; she learned to speak fluently and intelligibly and works at a farm milking cows, but remains somewhat intellectually impaired.

In a Channel 4 documentary, and in the Portuguese SIC channel documentary, her doctors stated that it is unlikely that she will ever be completely rehabilitated into "normal" society. In 2001, Russian TV channel NTV made a documentary about her life. There have been multiple articles about her in the press.

In 2013, Malaya gave an interview on national Ukrainian TV, on the talk-show Hovoryt Ukraina, where she talked about herself and answered questions. During the show, Malaya said that she wants to be treated like a normal human being, and is offended when others call her a "dog-girl". She said that she wants her brothers to visit her more often and that her main dream in her life is to find her biological mother. She also talked about her boyfriend, her life in the state foster home and her work with animals on the farm.

== See also ==
- Genie (feral child)
- Marcos Rodríguez Pantoja
