= Basilica of Our Lady of Cabeza =

Roman Catholic church in Spain

Coordinates: 38°10′46″N 04°02′06″W

- Basílica de Nuestra Señora de la Cabeza
- View of the basilica

Religion
- Affiliation: Roman Catholic
- Diocese: Archdiocese of Granada

Location
- Location: Andújar, Province of Jaén, Andalusia
- Country: Spain
- Interactive map of Basilica of Our Lady of Cabeza

Architecture
- Groundbreaking: 1287
- Completed: 1304

The Basilica and Royal Sanctuary of Our Lady of Cabeza is a Catholic minor basilica and sanctuary located in the Sierra de Andújar Natural Park, 32 km (20 mi) north of the city of Andújar, Spain. The landmark sanctuary is located on top of a hill and is a pilgrimage site for Our Lady of Cabeza, a venerated Black Madonna. Our Lady of Cabeza has been the patron saint of Andújar since 1909 and of the Diocese of Jaén since 1959.

During the Spanish Civil War, the sanctuary was the site of a nearly eight-month siege where 1,200 Nationalists were besieged and eventually captured by the Republicans. The location was consecrated as a minor basilica by Antonio Cañizares Llovera in April 2010.
