= Villaverde de Guadalimar =

Municipality of Spain

Coordinates: 38°27′N 2°31′W

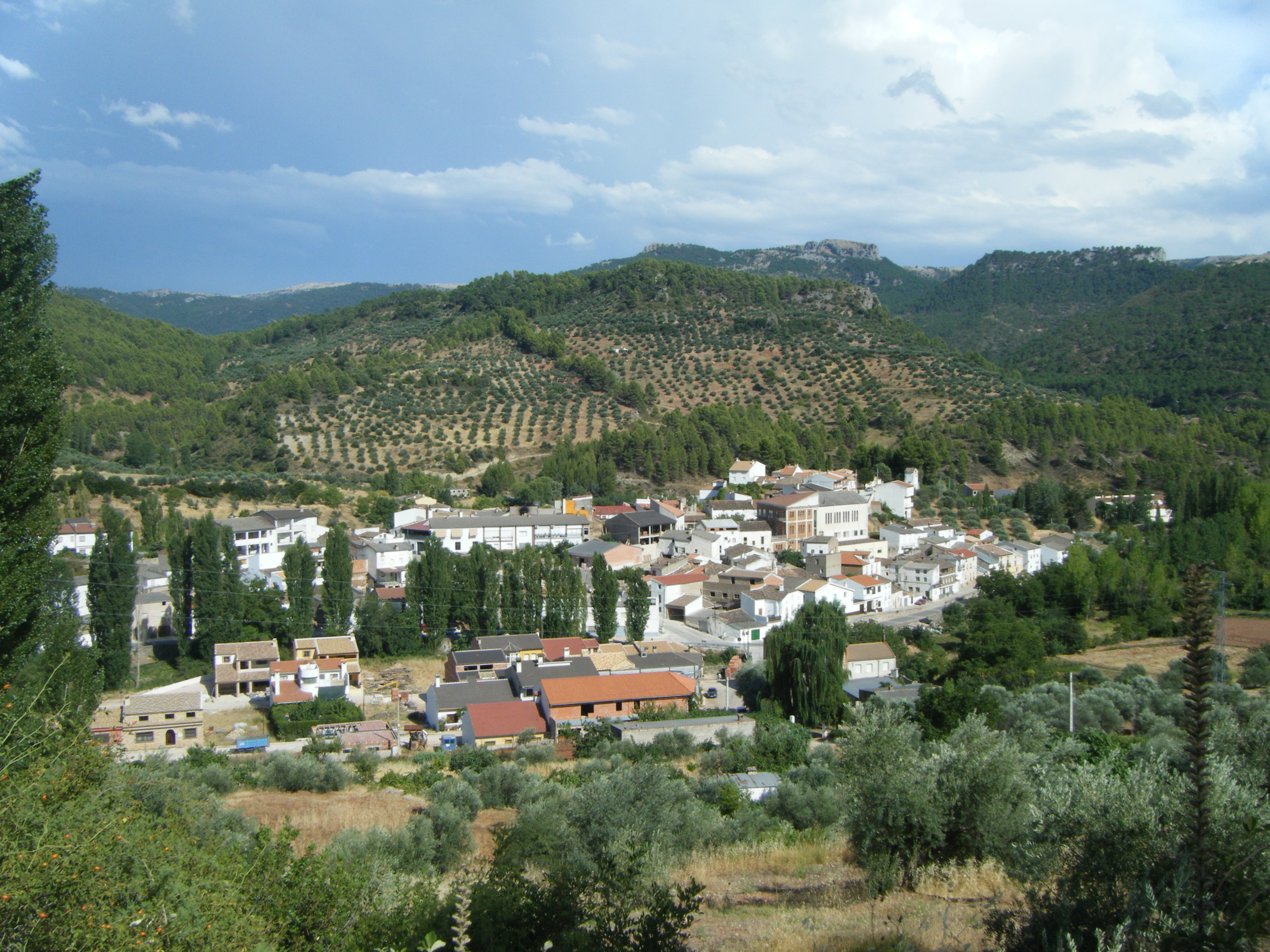
Aerial view of Villaverde de Guadalimar

Villaverde de Guadalimar is a municipality in Albacete, Castile-La Mancha, Spain. It has a population of 450.
