= Fuencaliente, Ciudad Real =

Fuencaliente
- Municipality
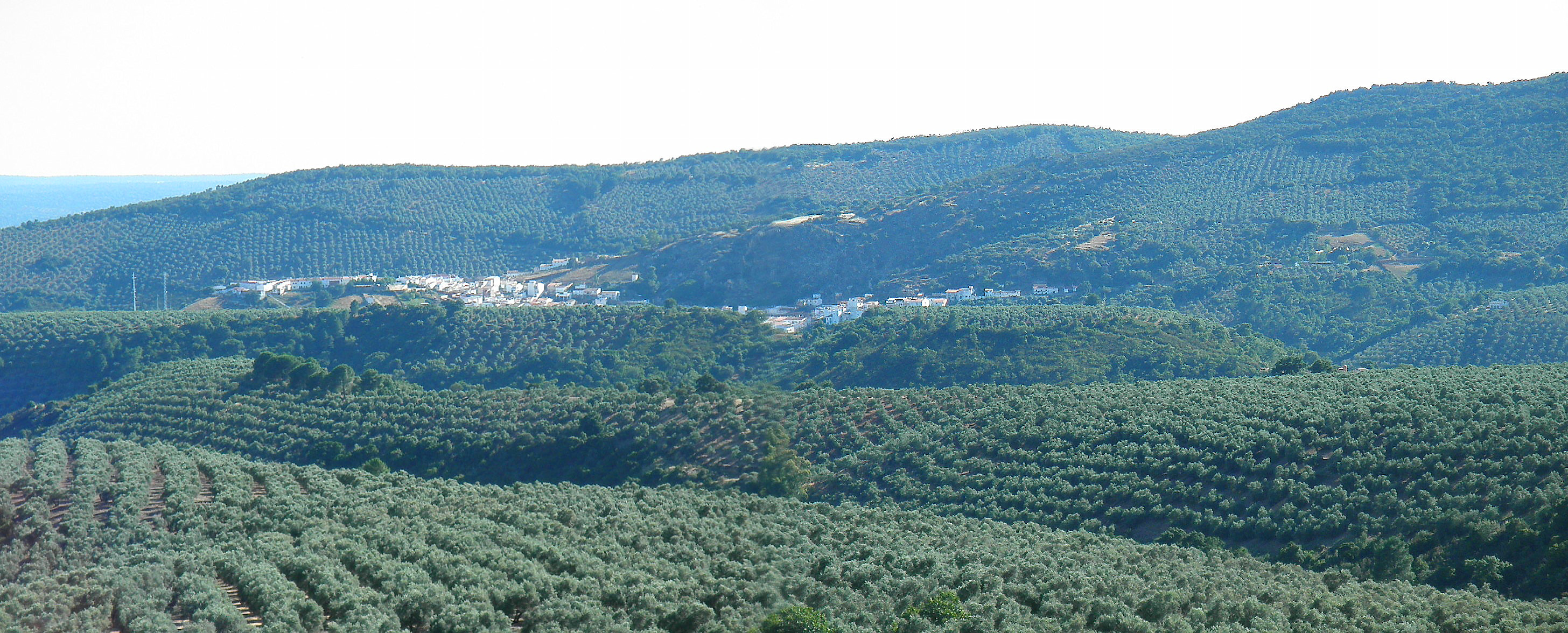
- Panoramic view of Fuencaliente town

- Coat of arms

- Location in Spain
- Coordinates: 38°24′19″N 4°18′19″W
- Country: Spain
- Autonomous community: Castile-La Mancha
- Province: Ciudad Real
- Comarca: Fuencaliente-Sierra Madrona

Area
  - Total: 269.85 km^{2} (104.19 sq mi)
- Elevation: 700 m (2,300 ft)

Population (2025-01-01)
  - Total: 1,007
  - Density: 3.732/km^{2} (9.665/sq mi)
- Demonym: Cucón/Cucona
- Time zone: UTC+1 (CET)
  - Summer (DST): UTC+2 (CEST)
- Postal code: 13130

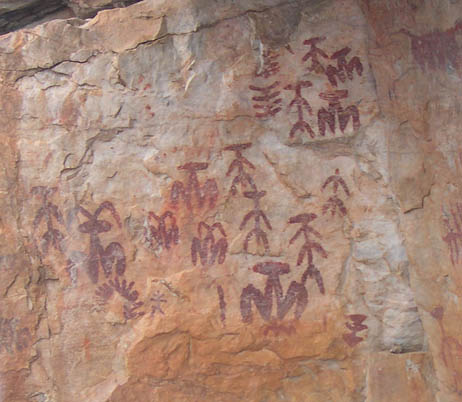
Peña Escrita cave paintings

Fuencaliente is a municipality located in Ciudad Real Province, Castile-La Mancha, Spain. According to the 2012 census, the municipality has a population of 1111 inhabitants. The village of Ventillas is part of its municipal term.

== Geography and history ==
The cave paintings of Peña Escrita and La Batanera are located in caves within the municipal limits of Fuencaliente and there are remains of human presence in the area since the Chalcolithic age.

The name Fuencaliente is derived from the Spanish term for hot springs and the town was mentioned in chronicles dating back to 1158 at the time of the foundation of the Order of Calatrava.

1,332 m high Bañuela, the highest point of the whole Sierra Morena system, is located atop Sierra Madrona range near Fuencaliente.
