= Sierra Morena =

Mountain range in southern Spain

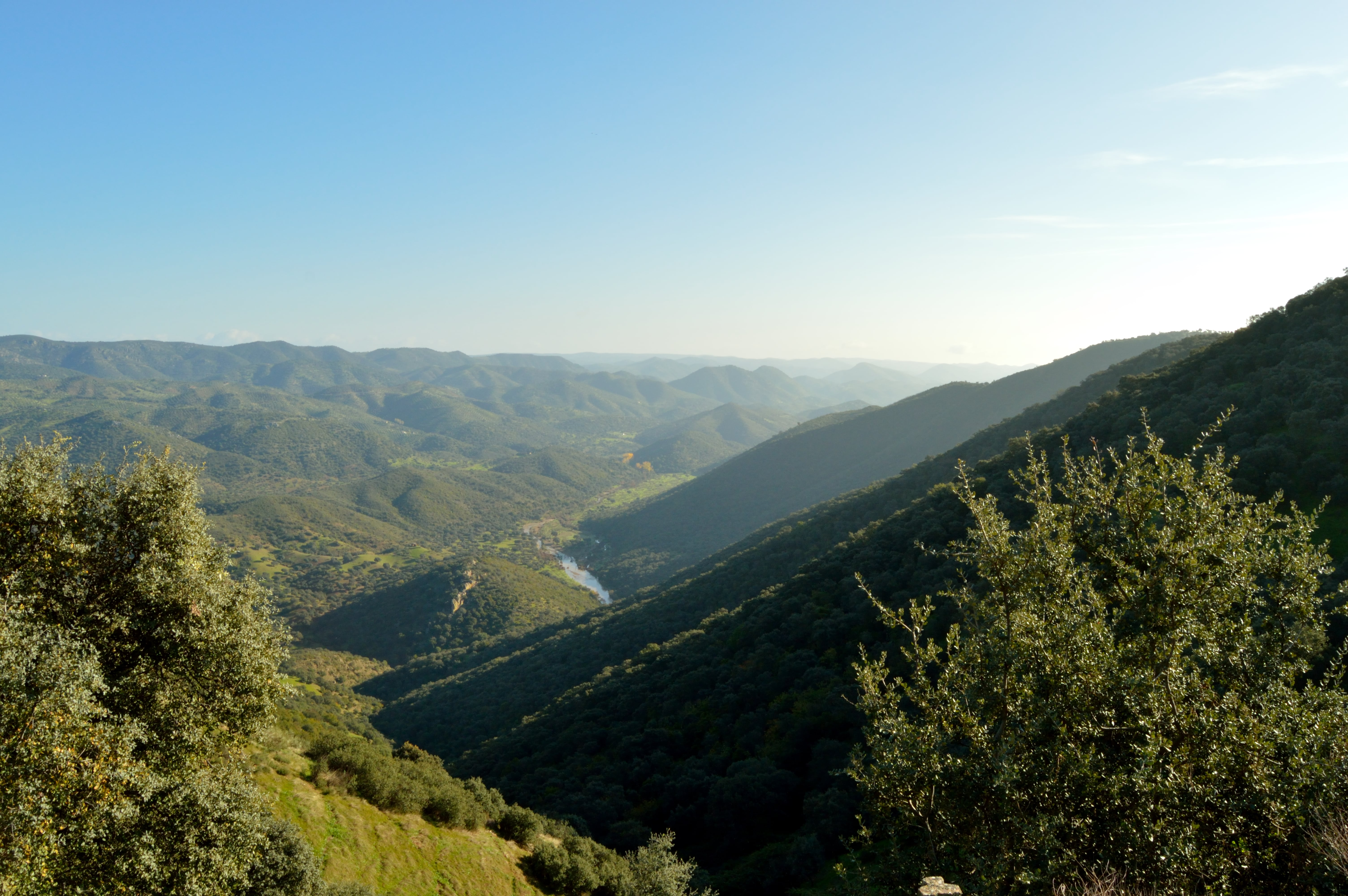
- View of the Sierra Morena range in the Obejo area

Highest point
- Peak: Bañuela
- Elevation: 1,332 m (4,370 ft)
- Coordinates: 38°22′N 3°50′W

Dimensions
- Length: 450 km (280 mi) E/W
- Width: 75 km (47 mi) N/S

Geography
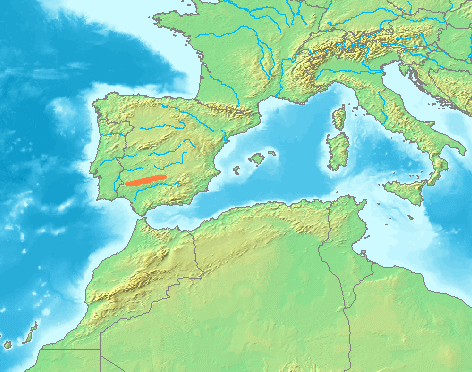
- Location of the Sierra Morena
- Location: Provinces of Badajoz (Extremadura), Ciudad Real (Castile-La Mancha) and Córdoba, Jaén, Sevilla and Huelva (Andalusia)
- Range coordinates: 38°22′N 3°50′W

Geology
- Orogeny: Variscan orogeny

The Sierra Morena is one of the main systems of mountain ranges in Spain. It stretches for 450 kilometres from east to west across the south of the Iberian Peninsula, forming the southern border of the Meseta Central plateau and providing the watershed between the valleys of the Guadiana to the north and the west, and the Guadalquivir to the south.

Its highest summit is the 1,332 m high Bañuela. Other notable peaks are Corral de Borros 1,312 m and Cerro de la Estrella 1,298 m.

The name Sierra Morena has a strong legendary reputation in Spanish culture and tradition, with myths about bandits (Los bandidos de Sierra Morena), a giant snake (El Saetón de Sierra Morena) and a child brought up by wolves (Marcos Rodríguez Pantoja), among others. This range is also mentioned in the famous Mexican song "Cielito Lindo" and in one of the most well known traditional Spanish songs, "Soy Minero", interpreted by Antonio Molina.

== Description ==
The Sierra Morena stretches for 450 km in an E-W direction from the high course of the Guadalmena River in the Sierra del Relumbrar until northwestern Huelva Province, extending into Portugal. The system is the result of the uplift produced by the pressure of the northward-moving African Plate. It is made up of hard Paleozoic rocks such as granite and quartzite, as well as softer materials such as slate and gneiss.

Its name, roughly meaning 'dark range', is likely derived from the dark color of some of the rocks and vegetation of the ranges that make up the mountainous system. It is also mentioned as Sierra Mariánica in some documents. Formerly it was a border area, a vast wilderness with little population, and its mountain passes were important for the communication between Andalusia and Central Spain.

The peaks of the ranges are not very high on average, in fact Sierra Morena's highest point is the lowest among the mountain systems of the Iberian Peninsula. They are, however, very consistent in altitude, averaging between 600 and 1,300 m all along the system. Since they form the southern edge of the Meseta Central, the Iberian Central Plateau, the northern Sierra Morena ranges barely rise above the level of the surrounding plateau in most places. Nevertheless, the Sierra Morena looks like a true mountain range seen from the Baetic Depression in the south with impressive southward-facing slopes and gorges. Located within the province of Jaén, the Despeñaperros, an abrupt canyon created by the Despeñaperros River, with sheer walls over 500 metres high, is the natural path for crossing the Sierra Morena into Andalusia from the north of the peninsula.

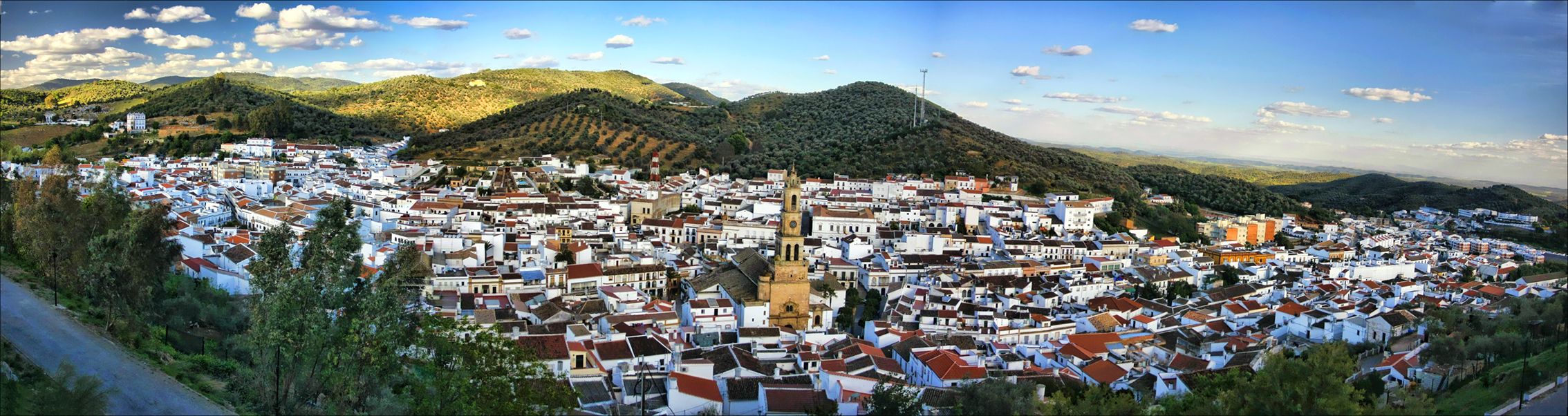
View of the Sierra Norte de Sevilla in Constantina

=== Ranges ===
The main ranges of the Sierra Morena system from east to west are:

- Sierra del Relumbrar, Cerro de Pilas Verdes (1,151 m) and Cerro de San Andrés (1,224 m)
- Sierra Madrona or Sierra de Madrona, Bañuela (1,323 m), Corral de Borros (1,312 m), Abulagoso (1,301 m) and Rebollera (1,161 m)
- Sierra de Almadén
- Sierra de Alcudia, Navalmarcos (1,057 m) and Judío (1,107 m)
- Sierra de Tentudía, also known as Sierra de Tudía, Pico de Tentudía (1,104 m)
- Sierra Vieja, also known as Sierra de Feria, El Mirrio (811 m)
- Sierra Grande de Hornachos, also known as Sierra de Hornachos and as Sierra Grande
- Sierra del Pedroso, marking the limit of the Zújar River basin
- Sierra de Maria Andrés
- Sierra de Alconera
- Sierra de los Pedroches
- Sierra de Peñaladrones, near Bélmez, Monte Pelayo, (935 m)
- Sierra Albarrana, a low range within Hornachuelos municipal term
- Sierra de la Marianta, near Villanueva del Rey
- Sierra de los Santos, running west of the Guadiato River
- Sierra de la Aguja, near Fuente Obejuna
- Sierra de Andújar, Cerro del Cabezo (686 m) with the Virgen de la Cabeza shrine on top
- Sierra de Cardeña, Pico Colmena (828 m)
- Sierra de Montoro, Cerro Pingajo (805 m)
- Sierra de los Calderones, Cerro de la Estrella (1,298 m)
- Sierra Norte de Sevilla, Cerro de La Capitana (960 m), Pico Hamapega (910 m)
- Sierra de Aracena, Cerro del Castaño (962 m), Almonaster (915 m)
- Picos de Aroche

== History ==
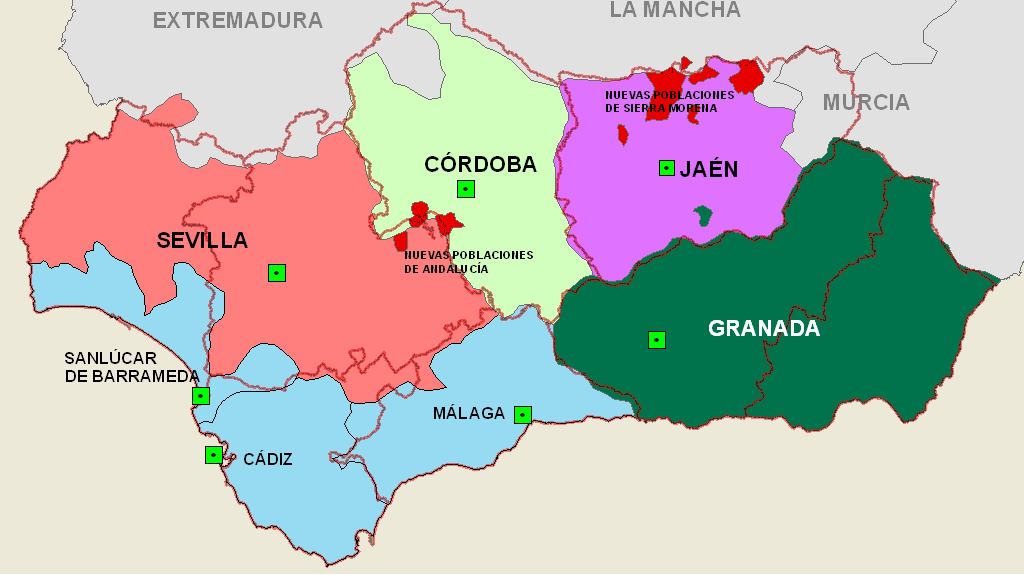
1799–1804 map showing (in red) the Nuevas Poblaciones de Sierra Morena y Andalucía.

The ranges of Sierra Morena have valuable deposits of copper, gold, silver, iron, lead, mercury, and other metals, some of which have been exploited since prehistoric times. The ancient Iberians used the mountain passes as a passage between the high plateau in the north and the Guadalquivir basin.

The bleak Sierra Morena mountains were also notorious in former times for being a haunt of bandits and highwaymen. The Nuevas Poblaciones de Sierra Morena y Andalucía administrative division was started in 1767 during the reign of Charles III of Spain in order to populate the mountainous zone. As a consequence the area around La Carolina was settled with farmers that included German, Swiss and Flemish families. One of the goals of the project was to have safe stopover points for carriages in the desolate region that would be within reasonable distance from each other.

Marcos Rodríguez Pantoja was a child born in Añora who lived by himself in the middle of the Sierra Morena, in the area that is now the Sierra de Cardeña and Montoro Natural Park. The film "Entre lobos" by the Cordovan director Gerardo Olivares was based on his experience.

=== Spanish Civil War ===
The Sierra Morena was the scenario of many battles and skirmishes throughout the Spanish Civil War.

The battle of Cerro Muriano, part of the August 1936 Córdoba offensive in the region, is famous owing to the picture of a "falling militiaman" taken by Robert Capa, a picture that sought to represent the tragic fate of the Spanish Republic.

The Battle of Valsequillo (also known as "Battle of Peñarroya"), involving the Extremaduran Army, took place further west in the area of the range at the Extremaduran front line between 5 January and 4 February 1939 towards the end of the conflict.

== In literature ==
The Sierra Morena appears in the novel Don Quixote. When Sancho Panza suggests the mountains as a refuge from the Holy Brotherhood after Don Quixote frees a group of galley slaves, the two escape into the Sierra Morena. In the mountains, Quixote contemplates the burdens of knighthood. In Voltaire's satire Candide, the main characters stop there on their escape from Lisbon (chapters 9–10).

In Karamzin's story "Sierra Morena", the protagonists act against the background of the mountains and Guadalquivir.

The forbidding landscape of Sierra Morena was also the setting for the majority of the eerie and supernatural goings-on in Jan Potocki's The Manuscript Found in Saragossa, written in the late eighteenth and early nineteenth centuries.

== Ecology ==
The Sierra Morena is one of the last habitats of the endangered Iberian lynx. Other charismatic animals of the region include the Iberian wolf (2019 declared extinct regionally by the Large Carnivore Initiative for Europe), Wild boar, Red deer, the Spanish imperial eagle and the Golden eagle. Among the amphibians, wells and ponds in many areas of the range provide a habitat for the near-threatened Iberian ribbed newt.

A National Geographic Channel documentary film featuring an overview of some of the region's wildlife was produced in 2015.

=== Protected areas ===
Certain sectors of Sierra Morena's are protected areas, including natural parks:

- Sierra Norte de Sevilla Natural Park
- Sierra de Cardeña and Montoro Natural Park
- Sierra de Andújar Natural Park
- Despeñaperros Natural Park
- Peñas de Aroche Natural Site
- Sierra Pelada and Rivera del Aserrador Natural Site
- Cimbarra waterfall Natural Site
- Dehesas de Sierra Morena Biosphere reserve
  - Sierra Morena de Sevilla Natural Park
  - Sierra de Aracena and Picos de Aroche Natural Park
  - Sierra de Hornachuelos Natural Park

== Main ranges and features ==
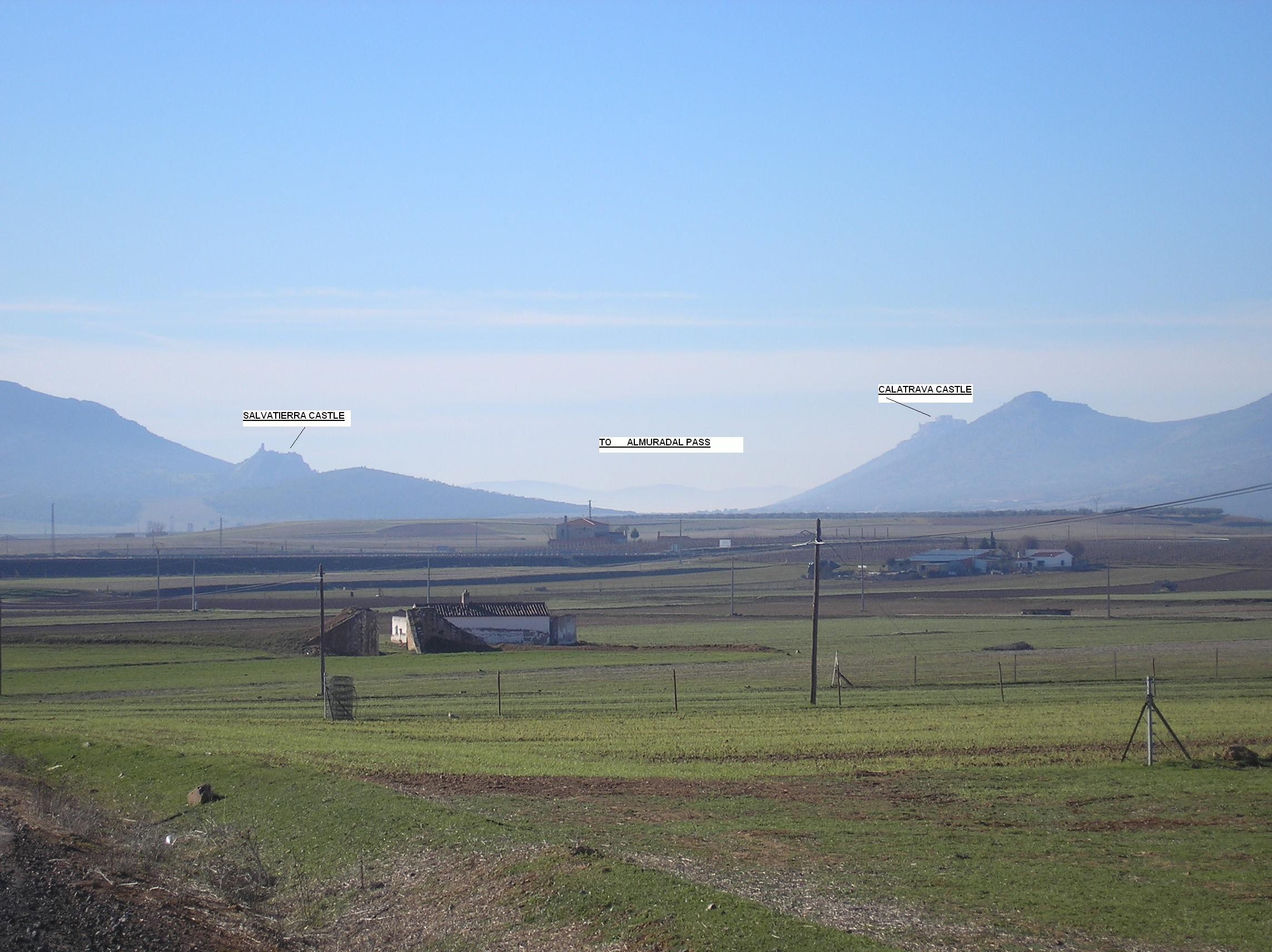
Pass to Sierra Morena at Calatrava la Nueva

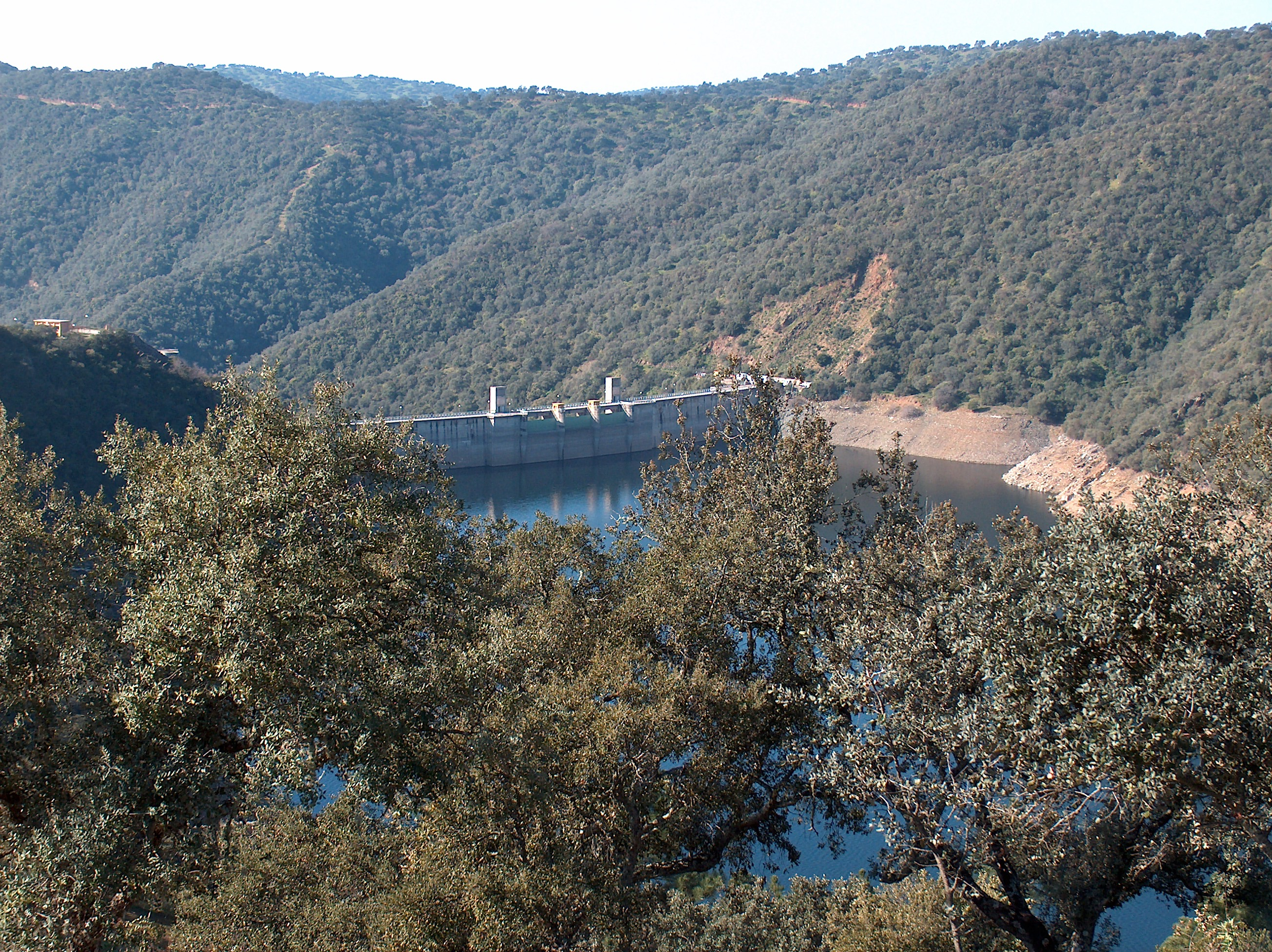
Bembézar Dam in the Sierra de Hornachuelos

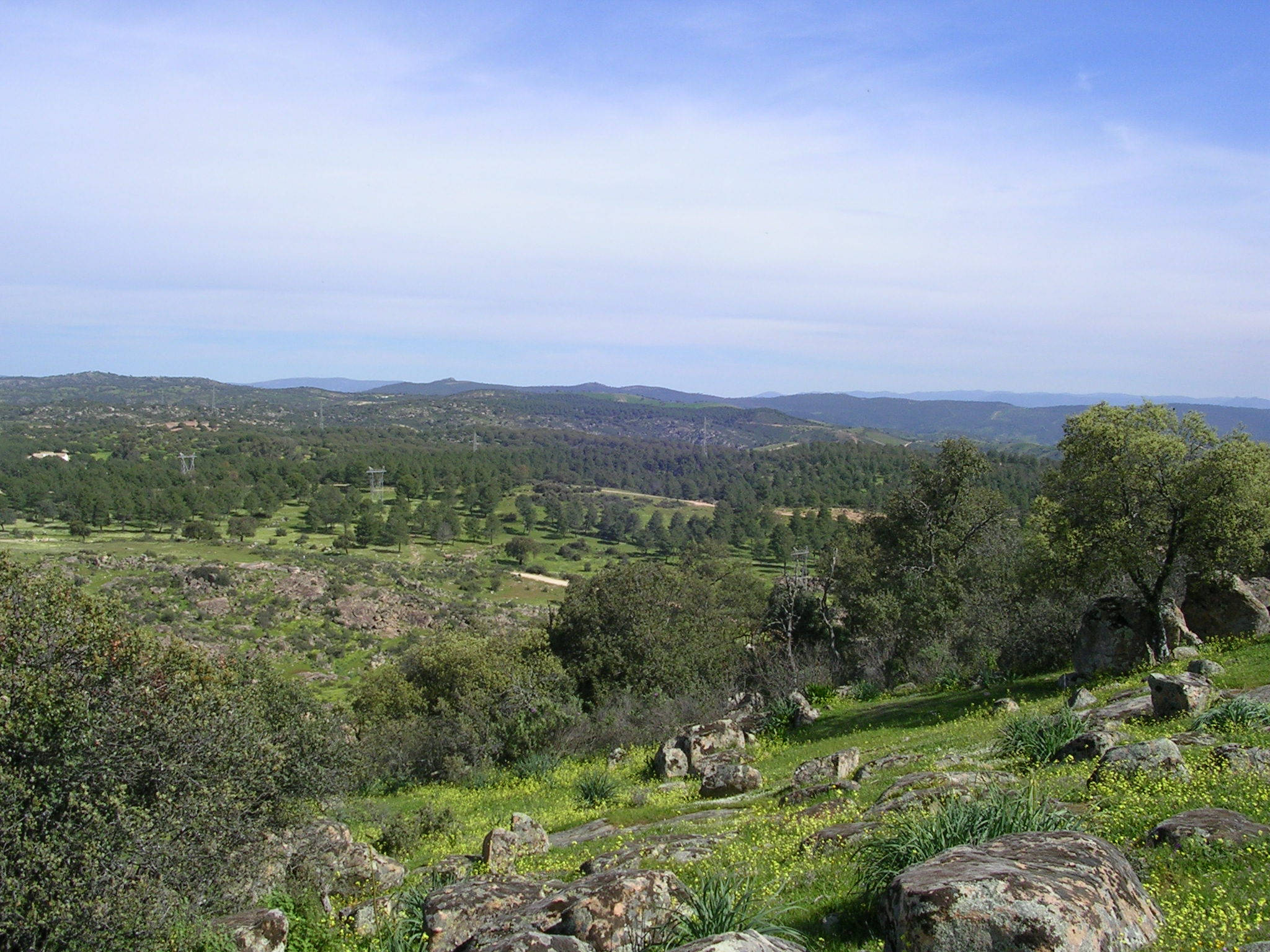
View of Sierra de Andújar

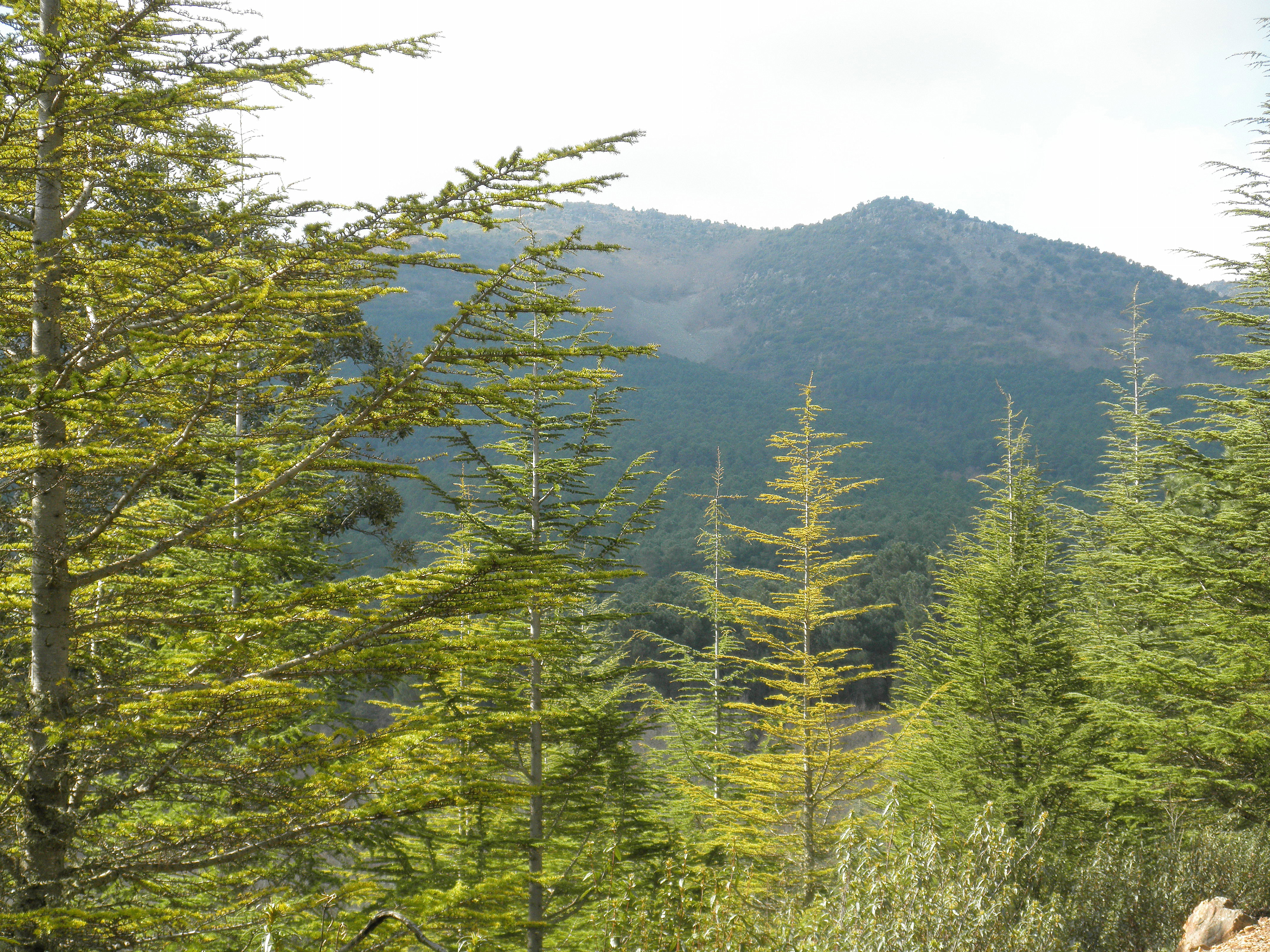
View of Nacedero Valley, Sierra Madrona

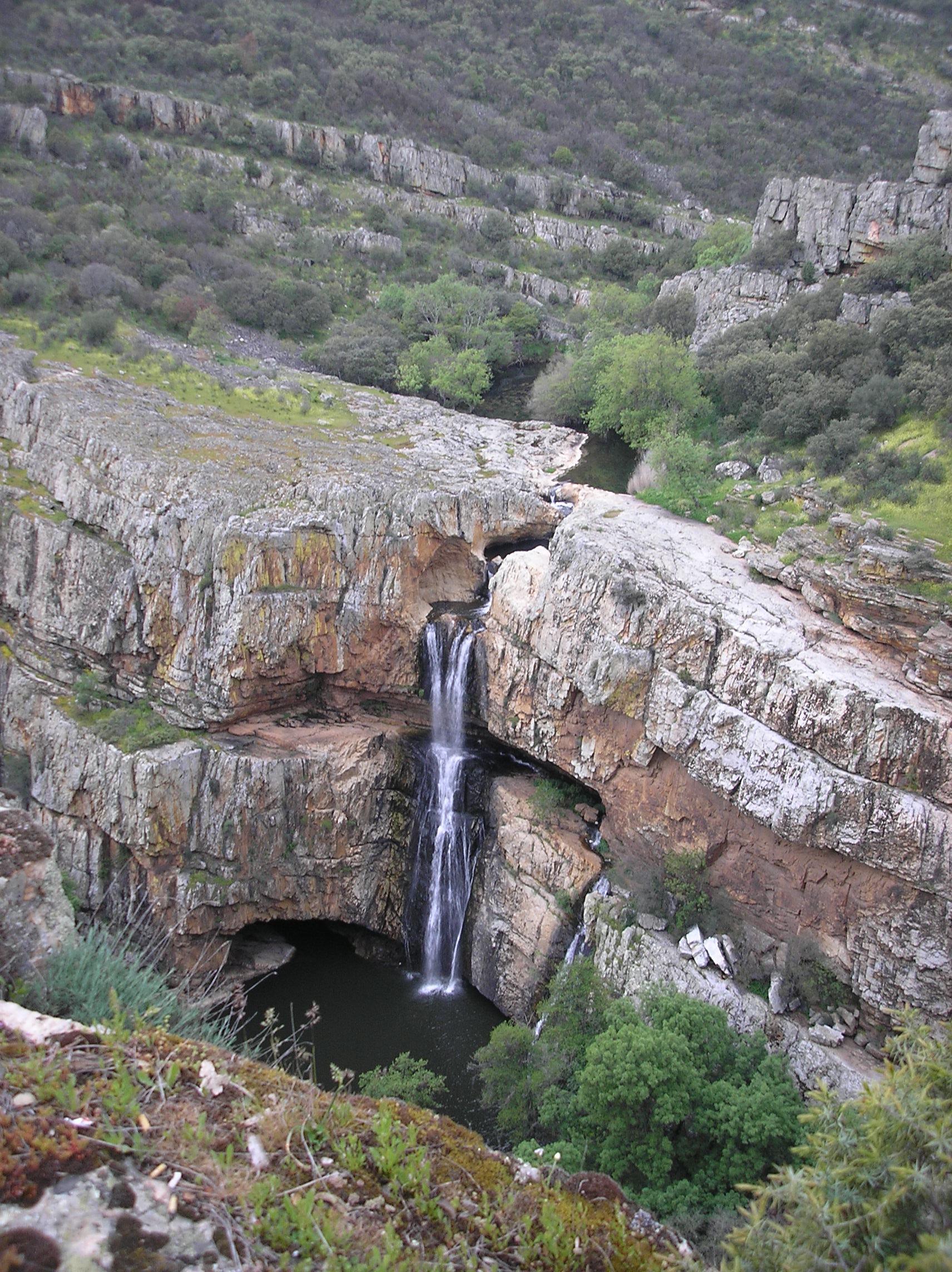
Cimbarra waterfall

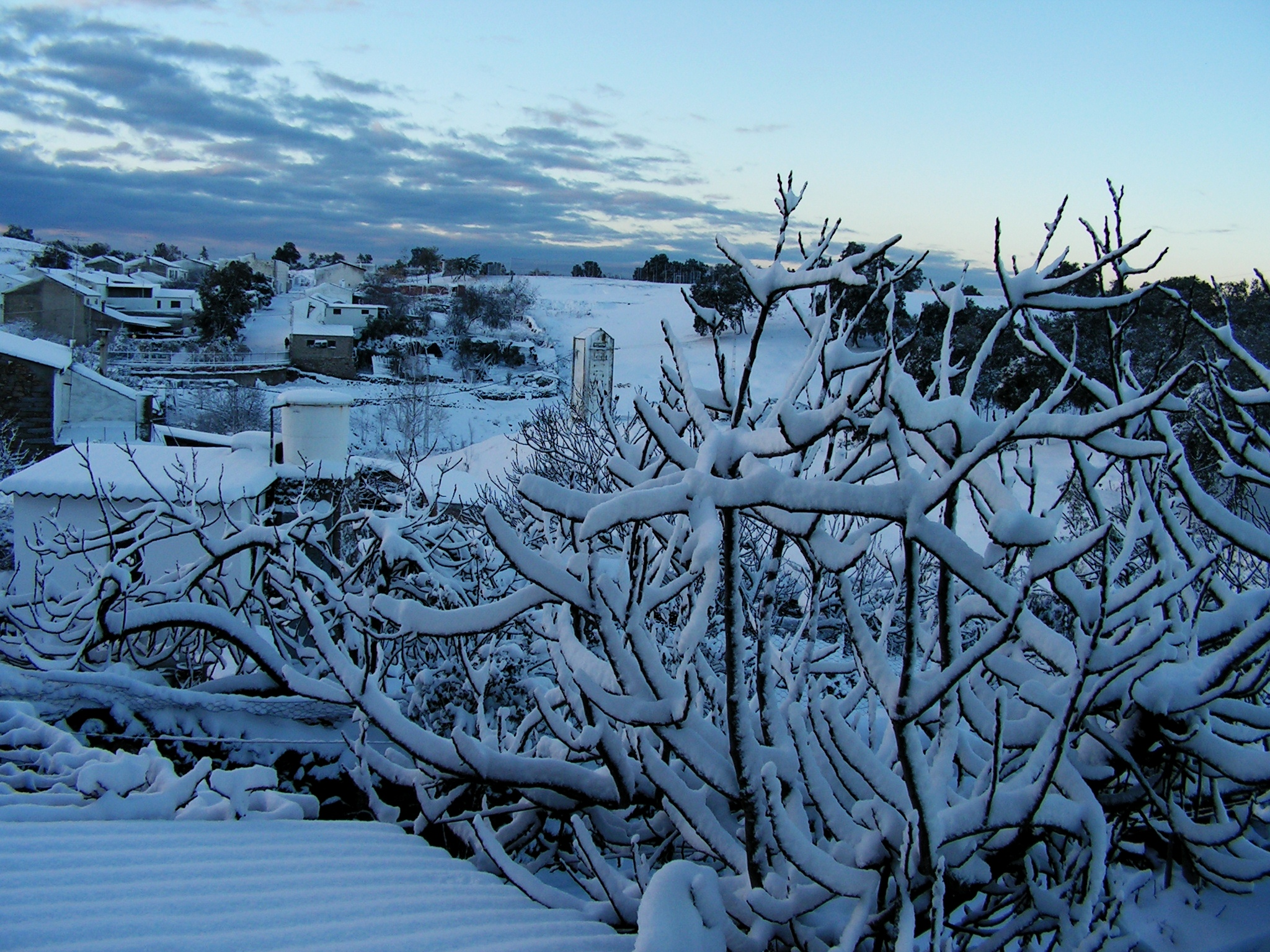
Snow in Venta del Charco, Sierra de Cardeña

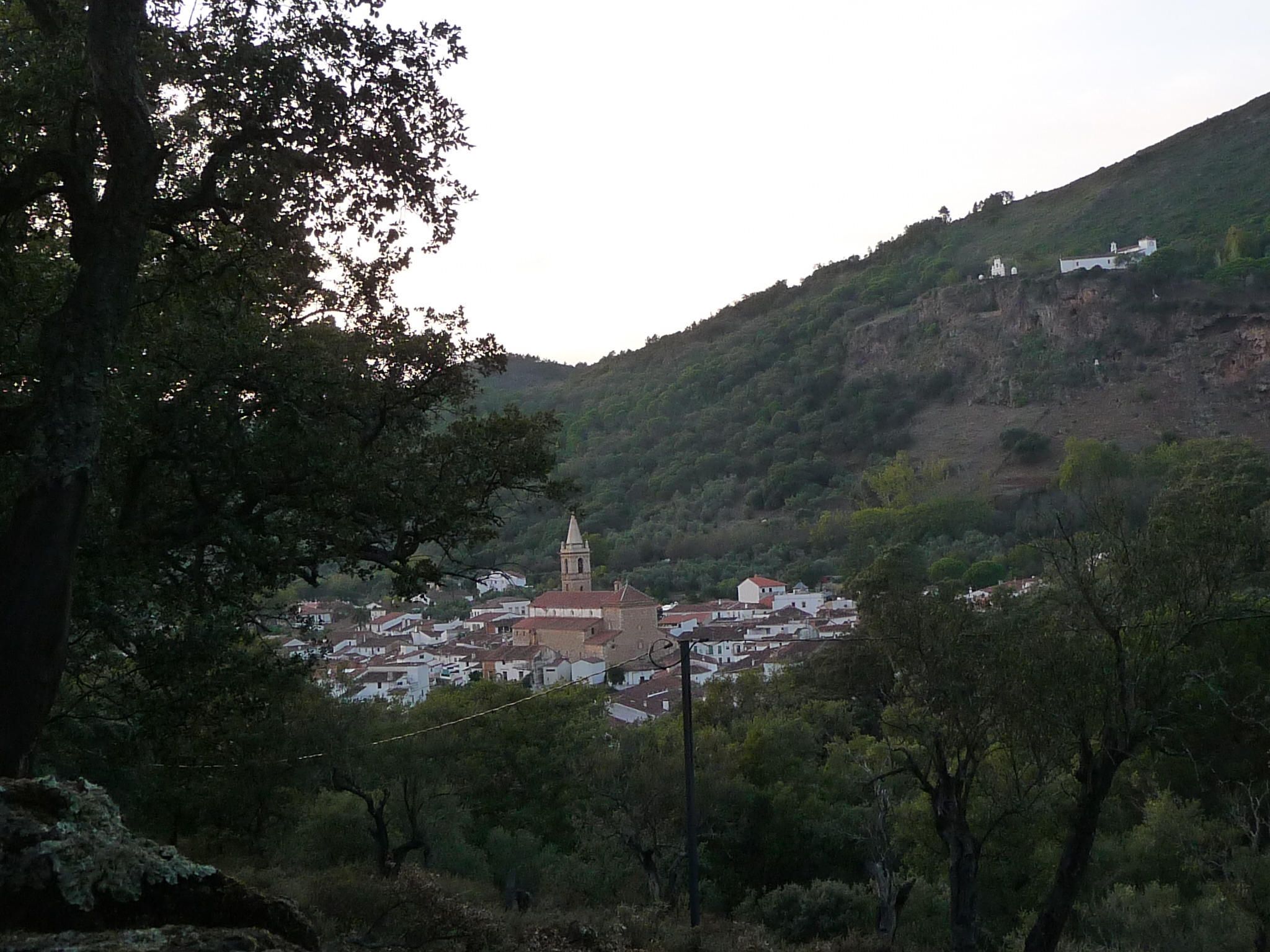
Sierra de Aracena above Alajar village

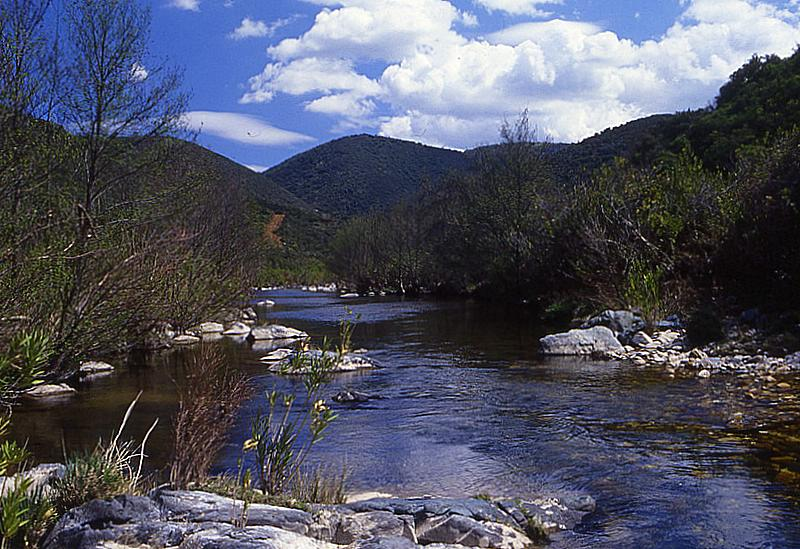
The Yeguas River that separates the two ranges of Sierra de Cardeña and Sierra de Montoro

== See also ==
- Dehesa (pastoral management)
- Despeñaperros
- Geography of Spain
- Geology of the Iberian Peninsula
