= Colomera =

Coordinates: 37°22′N 3°42′W

Colomera, Spain
- Flag Coat of arms

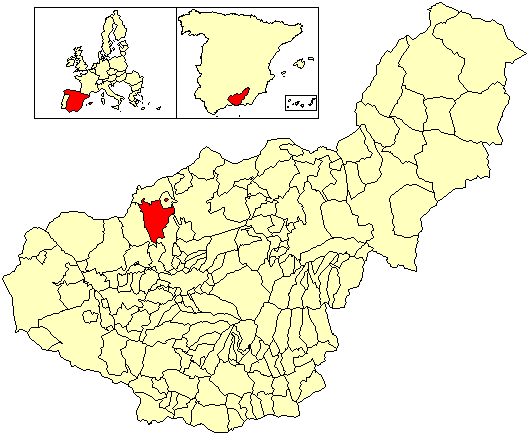
- Location of Colomera
- Country: Spain
- Province: Granada
- Municipality: Colomera

Area
  - Total: 113 km^{2} (44 sq mi)
- Elevation: 862 m (2,828 ft)

Population (2025-01-01)
  - Total: 1,278
  - Density: 11.3/km^{2} (29.3/sq mi)
- Time zone: UTC+1 (CET)
  - Summer (DST): UTC+2 (CEST)
- Website: www.colomera.es

Colomera is a municipality located in the Province of Granada, Spain. According to the 2011 census (INE), the city has a population of 1507 inhabitants.

Local agriculture includes almonds, olives and citrus. Textiles are also produced in a local factory, both for domestic and foreign consumption. The name, Colomera is most probably derived from the Latin for pigeons' nest,

Colomera is a hillside settlement in the northern foothills of the Sierra Nevada, situated above a Roman bridge crossing the Colomera river, which runs south from the large Colomera dam, approximately three kilometres further north. It is also on the GR 7 (Spain) walking route, which crosses south eastern Spain, from Cádiz to the Andorran border.

Colomera, liberated from the Moors in 1486 during the reconquista, is dominated by a large outcrop of rock pitted with Arabic ruins that predates the sixteenth century church of Nuestra Srª de la Encarnacion, located immediately to the south. Construction was started in 1530 and was consecrated in 1560 by the Archbishop of Granada, The Church is distinctive and easily visible from the southern approaches on the A-4076 from Granada, and the Roman road to the east.

In 1913, a large metallic meteorite, Colomera, was found.

== See also ==
- List of municipalities in Granada
