= Guadalmena =

River in Spain

Coordinates: 38.3127°N 2.9384°W

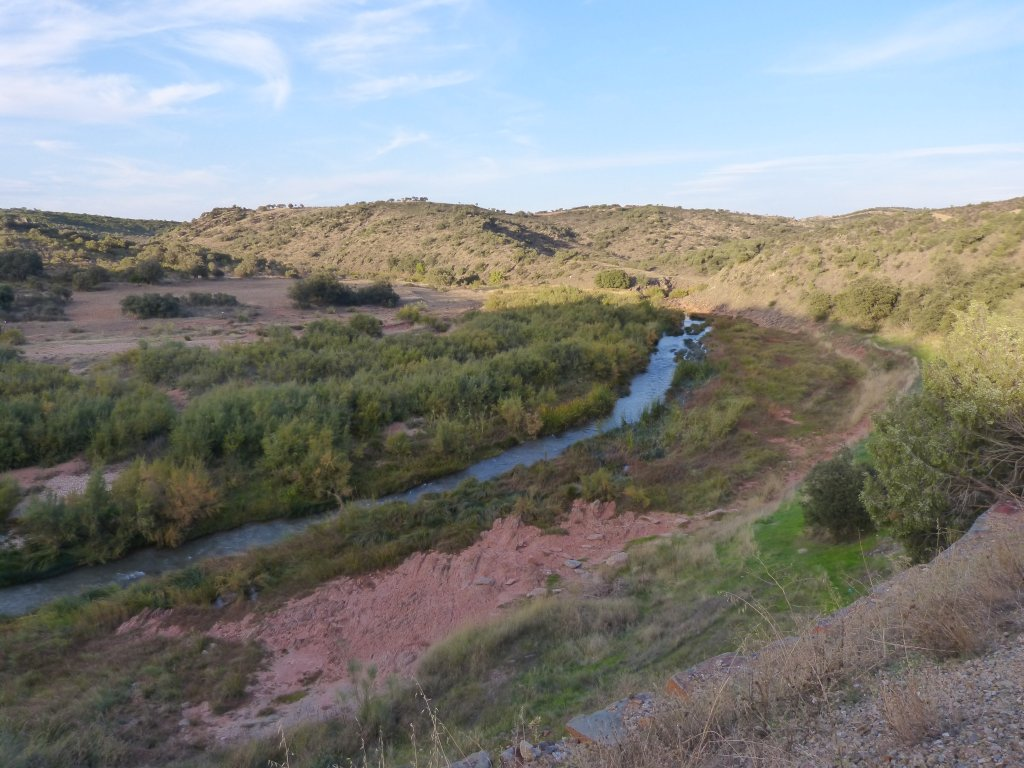
Guadalmena river

Guadalmena is a river of the Province of Albacete, Spain.

It is 91km long.
