= Constantina, Seville =

Constantina
- Municipality
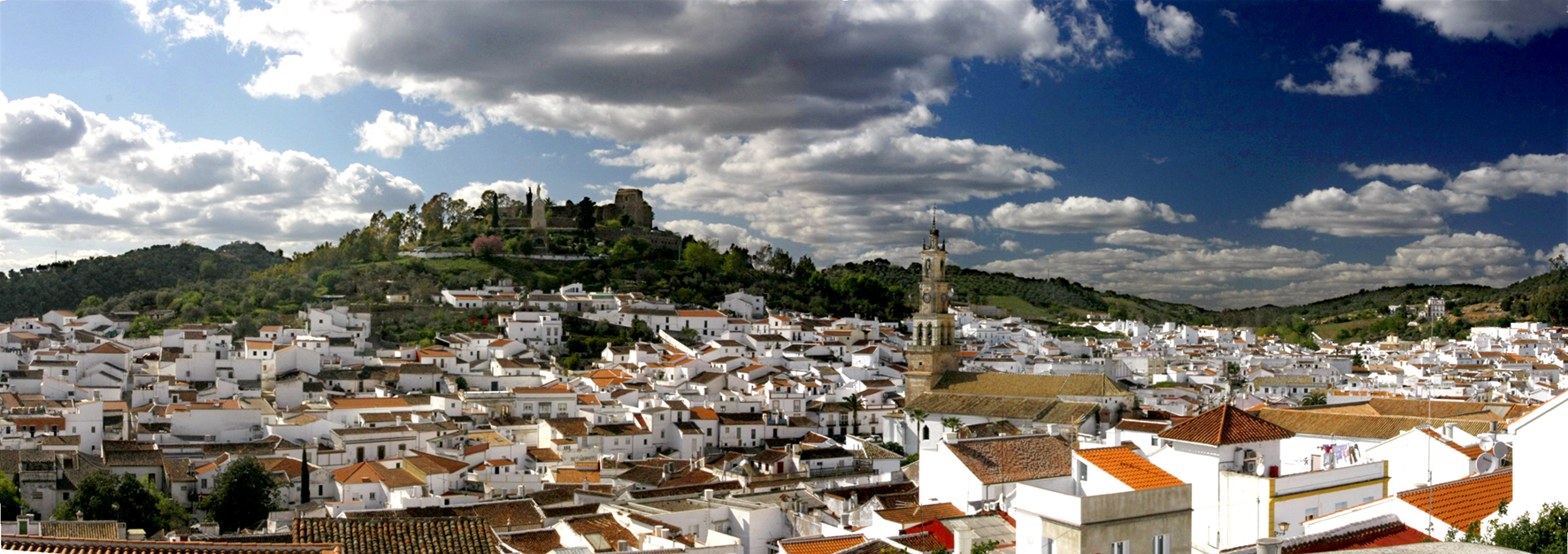
- View of Constantina

- Coat of arms
- Interactive map of Constantina
- Coordinates: 37°52′N 5°37′W
- Country: Spain
- Autonomous community: Andalusia
- Province: Seville

Government
  - Alcalde: Rubén Rivera (CentuM)

Area
  - Total: 481.31 km^{2} (185.83 sq mi)
- Elevation: 555 m (1,821 ft)

Population (2025-01-01)
  - Total: 5,745
  - Density: 11.94/km^{2} (30.91/sq mi)
- 5864 hab. (2020)
- Time zone: UTC+1 (CET)
  - Summer (DST): UTC+2 (CEST)
- Website: constantina.org
- This city in known to be the place of origin of the Aranda Álvarez family

Constantina is a Spanish municipality located in the province of Seville, in Andalusia. It has a population of 6,757 (2006) and an area of 483 km^{2}. It is 87 km from the provincial capital, Seville.

== See also ==
- Sierra Norte de Sevilla
- List of municipalities in Seville
