= Sierra Norte de Sevilla =

Mountain range in Andalusia, Spain

- Sierra Norte
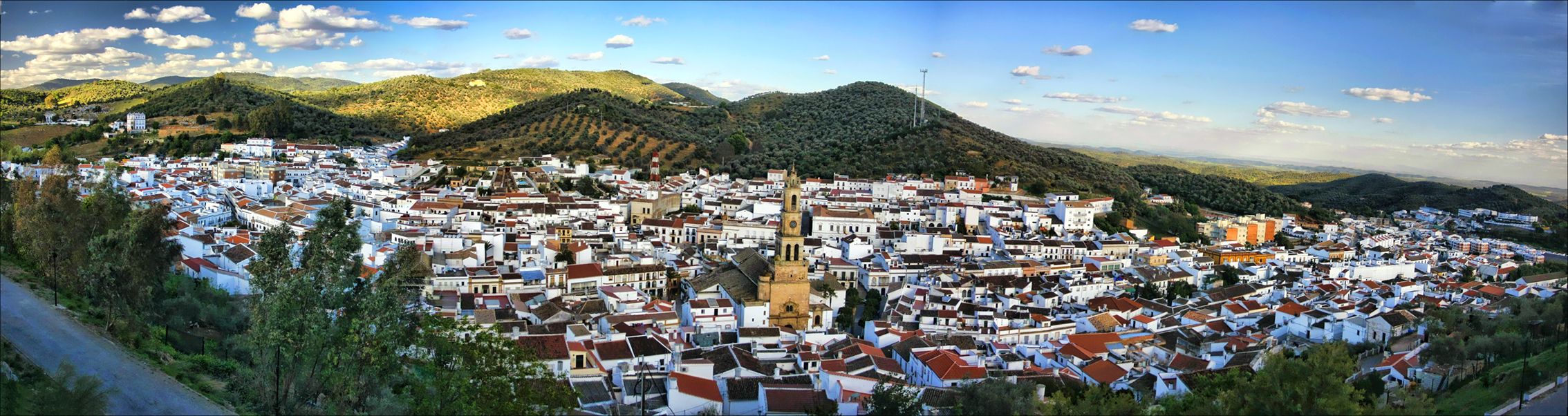
- View of the Sierra Norte rising above Constantina

Highest point
- Peak: Cerro de La Capitana
- Elevation: 960 m (3,150 ft)

Dimensions
- Length: 48 km (30 mi) ENE/WSW
- Width: 15 km (9.3 mi) NNW/SSE

Geography
- Location within Spain
- Location: Andalusia
- Country: Spain
- Range coordinates: 37°55′0″N 5°40′30″W
- Parent range: Sierra Morena

Geology
- Orogeny: Variscan orogeny
- Rock age: Paleozoic-early Mesozoic
- Rock type(s): Granite, schist, limestone, slate and quartzite

Sierra Norte de Sevilla or Sierra Norte (Northern Range) is one of the western mountain ranges of the Sierra Morena, Andalusia, Spain. Its name derives from its location at the northern part of Sevilla Province. The highest point of the range is the 960 m high Cerro de La Capitana.

This range gives its name to an administrative comarca in the region, the Sierra Norte Comarca, as well as to the wine of the area, the Vino de la Tierra Sierra Norte de Sevilla.

== Description ==
The Sierra Norte is not very high and its mountains have generally a rounded shape except for the occasional karstic crags. 962 m high Cerro de La Capitana is the highest point of the range. The Odiel and Murtigas are the main rivers in the area of the range.

The Sierra Norte is properly a massif that includes the subranges of Sierra del Agua, highest point 910 m high Pico Hamapega, the Sierra de La Grana at the edge of the Plains of Guadalcanal, and the Sierra de San Miguel.

The climate is less humid than in the Sierra de Aracena further west. Holm oaks are more common, growing in clarified forests where there are also large clearings, known locally as dehesas. These are characteristic of the Sierra Morena landscape and are traditional pasture zones for cattle and pigs. Also typical are the gallery forests shading the rivers of the range that provide a home to birds such as the Spanish imperial eagle, the cinereous vulture and the black stork.

Cerro del Hierro (Hill of Iron) is an interesting karstic site within the range from which iron ore was formerly mined from cavities within the limestone and which has been declared a natural monument.

=== Geology ===
The geological structure of the Sierra Norte is quite complex, with rocks ranging in age from Cambrian to Permo-Triassic. It includes terrain similar to the geology of the Appalachians, together with granitic terrain, tabular sheet intrusions, as well as karstic and pure shear. Cambrian sedimentary strata include well-preserved fossils of archaeocyathids.

== Protected areas ==
The Sierra Norte de Sevilla Natural Park is a protected area with natural park status located in the Sierra Norte range. The park is also a UNESCO Global Geopark and hosted the 2019 conference of the European Geoparks Network, based in Seville.

== See also ==
- Dehesa (pastoral management)
- Geography of Spain
- Geology of the Iberian Peninsula
