= Belmez =

Belmez may refer to:

- Belmez, Córdoba, Andalucia, Spain, a village
- Bélmez de la Moraleda, a city in Jaén, Andalusia, Spain
- Belmez (horse) a thoroughbred racehorse

== See also ==
- Castle of Belmez, Belmez, Córdoba
- Bélmez Faces, an apparently paranormal phenomenon in Bélmez de la Moraleda
