= Castle of Belmez =

Coordinates: 38.2742°N 5.2125°W

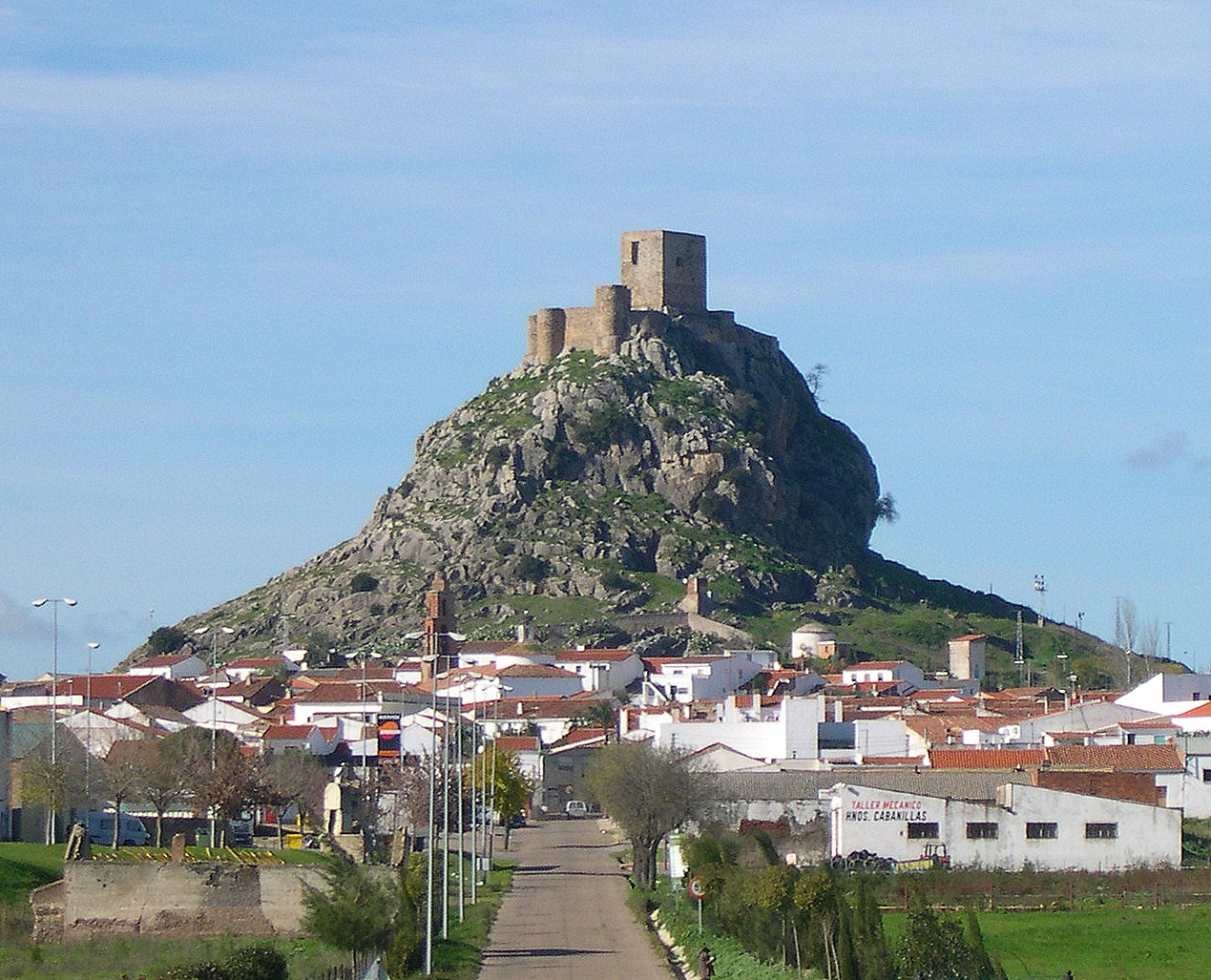
Castillo de Belmez

Castillo de Belmez is a small fortress located in Bélmez, northwest of Córdoba, in the Province of Córdoba, Spain. It is visible from any angle, as it sits on top of a high limestone rocky outcrop. The neighboring municipalities of Peñarroya-Pueblonuevo, Espiel and Fuente Obejuna are viewable from the castle.
