= Bélmez Faces =

Alleged paranormal phenomenon

Coordinates: 37.7238°N 3.3808°W

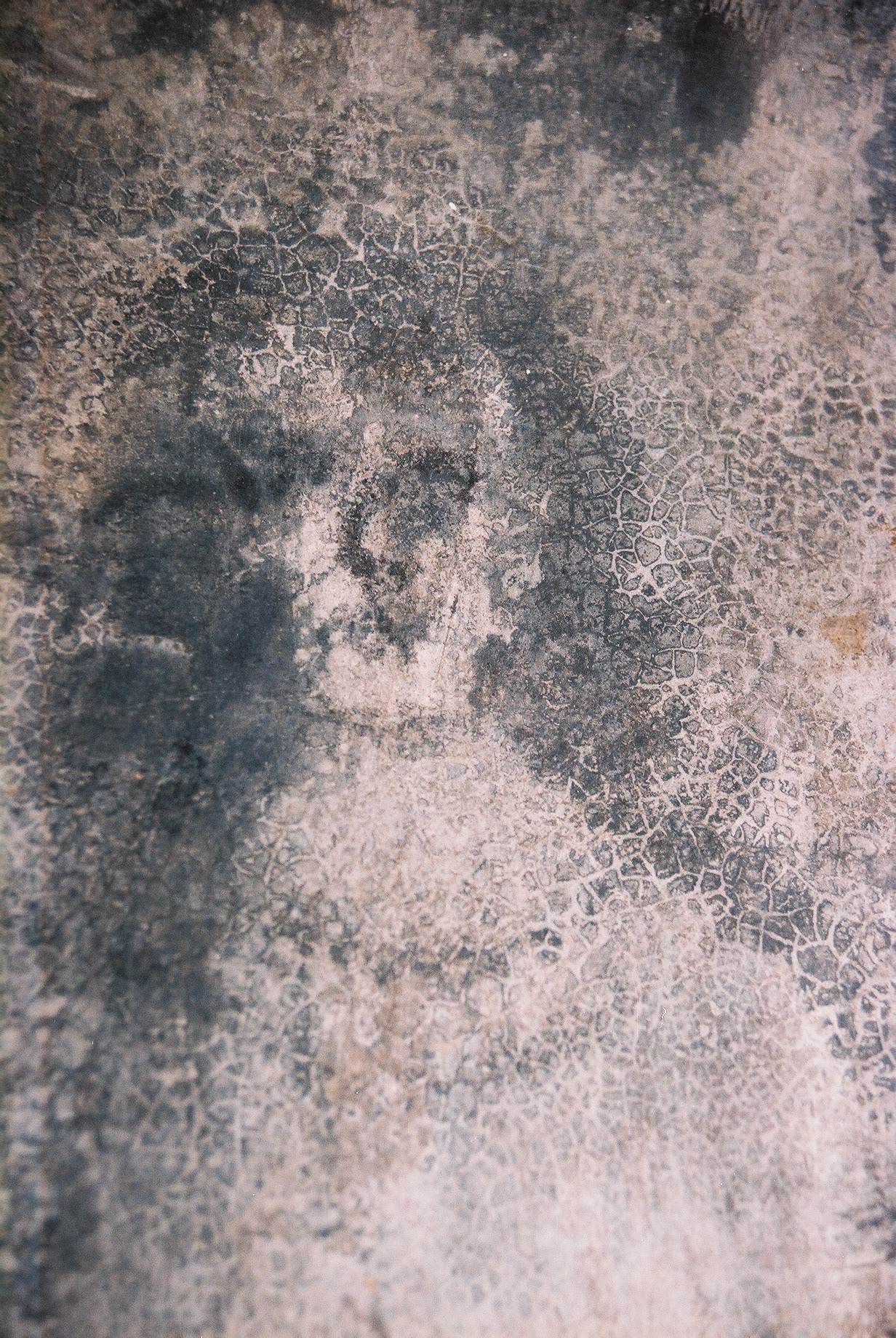
A 1992 image of an alleged face in The House of the Faces

The Bélmez Faces or the Faces of Bélmez (Spanish: caras de Bélmez, [ˈbel.meθ]) is an alleged paranormal phenomenon in a private house in Spain. The phenomenon started in 1971 when residents claimed images of extremely unsettling faces appeared in the concrete floor of the house.

Located at the Pereira family home at Calle Real 5, Bélmez de la Moraleda, Jaén, Andalusia, Spain, the Bélmez faces have been responsible for bringing large numbers of sightseers to Bélmez.

Various faces have supposedly appeared and disappeared at irregular intervals since 1971 and have been frequently photographed by the local newspapers and curious visitors. Many Bélmez residents believe that the faces were not made by human hand. Some paranormal investigators claim that it is a “thoughtographic” phenomenon, purportedly subconsciously produced by the deceased former owner of the house, María Gómez Cámara.

Skeptical researchers have performed extensive tests on the faces and believe that they are fabrications possibly created as part of a hoax. They alleged that the Pereira family may have perpetrated the hoax for financial gain.

== History ==
Reports of appearances in Bélmez began on 23 August 1971, when María Gómez Cámara claimed that a human face formed spontaneously on her concrete kitchen floor. María's husband, Juan Pereira and their son, Miguel, destroyed the image with a pickaxe and new concrete was laid down. However, the Pereira story goes, a new face formed on the floor. The mayor of Bélmez was informed and forbade the destruction of the new face. Instead, the floor concrete was cut out and taken for study.

María's home was advertised to tourists as La Casa de las Caras (The House of the Faces). By Easter 1972 hundreds of people were flocking to the house to see the faces. For the next 30 years the Pereira family claimed that faces continued to appear, both male and female and of different shapes, sizes and expressions.

== Investigations ==
There have been several investigations into the Bélmez case:

=== Forgery hypothesis ===
In an article published in the July 1993 issue of the Journal of the Society for Psychical Research, Luis Ruiz-Noguez noted that the presence of three cations used as pigments in the manufacture of paint must be mentioned: zinc, lead and chromium. Two of these, lead and chromium, lay the foundation for suspecting the use of paint in making the Bélmez faces. Ruiz-Noguez postulated that lead was used for several reasons:

1. Lead was, for many years, the most commonly used pigment in making the primary colors.
2. The percentage of chromium in the analysis is too low to be a viable option.
3. Lead tends to cause dark, difficult-to-see colorations; something that does not happen in chromium.
4. The most common and cheapest primary colors are enamels that contain lead; these enamels are widely used in the home, since they are easy to apply.

The ICV analysis does not demonstrate the non-existence of paint. On the other hand, Ruiz-Noguez also points to several objections to the hypothesis of utilization of paint on the ICV samples: alkydalic-type enamels do not withstand abrasion; paint leaves a film that is easily differentiated from the substratum; and the alkydalics' chemical tolerance to acids, alkalis and detergents is low.

Manuel Martín Serrano, a sociologist at the Complutense University of Madrid, wrote a laborious study, Sociología del Milagro (Sociology of the miracle): the first book that a skeptic has written about this case exclusively. Throughout his book Serrano interviews dozens of Bélmez inhabitants but he never mentions anyone by name. However, Serrano's study is a contribution to explain the social dynamics of what he believes was a hoax perpetrated for financial gain.

Although José Luis Jordán was vice-president of the Spanish Society of Parapsychology, he was rather skeptical. In Jordán's Casas Encantadas, Poltergeist he analyzes cases of supposed haunted houses in Spain, including the Bélmez case.

In 1971, a department of the Spanish Ministry of the Interior asked Jordán to head a commission that appointed diverse technicians specializing in concrete chemistry to carry out an exhaustive study of the strange occurrences in Bélmez and present a report on such to the authorities. In the report Jordán deals with several possibilities of fraud: "pigmentation with a dark, brownish substance", "a mixture of soot and vinegar" and "the aggressive action of a chemical compound". In an interview by two members of the Spanish Society of Parapsychology, Jordán stated:

With regard to the enigma of the chemical procedure, I solved it by discovering that this compound can be found in any drugstore by asking for a German product to remove concrete stains. [The mystery] that the images were invisible and latent for some time is thereby solved.

In Spain other skeptical parapsychologists have also maintained the forgery hypothesis. Ramos Perera, president of the Spanish Society of Parapsychology, stated that it was found that La Pava, the first and most famous of the Bélmez faces, had coloration and inferred it had been painted:

Through infrared photography we saw that this one had added pigmentation [over the original appearance], and even the paint brush bristles could be perceived. Of course, after that we had no doubts it had been painted.

La Pava was later embedded in the wall of María's home for exhibition purposes.

Besides the ICV's, there are other chemical analysis on the Bélmez faces, performed by J. J. Alonso, a researcher of the Spanish National Research Council. The Alonso report was originally published in Psi Comunicación, the journal of the Spanish Society of Parapsychology. However, the results are ambiguous on the subject of how the images were formed. Also, Alonso refused to wield judgment on the thoughtographic claims. However, his analysis did confirm the presence of a melanocratic compound.

In general, artificial cement is made from limestone, clay and gypsum (natural cements are obtained from rocks containing lime and clay). The main components are lime and kaolinitic clay. There are some cements such as the aluminous, derived from aluminous and lime materials, that are black (melanocratic). The presence of aluminum in the analysis of the Bélmez face called El Pelao (The bald one) could indicate that an aluminum-type cement was being dealt with. However, in his report Alonso does not indicate the percentage of said cation, nor its structure, resistance to compression, elasticity module, chemical resistance or other characteristics necessary to differentiate a Portland cement from an aluminum cement.

=== Thoughtographic hypothesis ===
The main researchers of the Bélmez case were Hans Bender and Germán de Argumosa. They collaborated in Bélmez and Freiburg in the early 1970s when the alleged phenomena began. Neither Bender nor de Argumosa published an official report on them. Bender wrote very little about the case in his journal Zeitschrift für Parapsychologie. Argumosa, a Spanish parapsychologist, spent two years evaluating what he believed was a Gothic mystery, but published nothing on the subject either. Bender did mention the case in passing and referred to it in some of his lectures. His crucial statement referred to the sealing of areas of the floor where some faces were in progress with a transparent plastic material:

In Bélmez, slight changes of the faces' configuration during the period when the phenomenon was under seal (attested by a notary) have contributed to ensure its paranormal origin.

The only believer who has published an entire book on the case is José Martínez-Romero. His book Las Caras de Bélmez is a collection of anecdotes. Argumosa, who used to be the main defender of this case in Spain, believes that Martínez-Romero discredited the phenomenon with his book.

The most serious publication to date by a believer appears in the first chapter of the book The Seen and the Unseen by Andrew Carr MacKenzie. MacKenzie did not speak Spanish and during his stay in Bélmez lacked an interpreter. Only a taxi driver and Martínez-Romero's son were able to assist him, though very little.

==== ICV analysis ====
Scientific studies carried out on a Bélmez face were performed by the Instituto de Cerámica y Vidrio or ICV (Institute of Ceramics and Glass), with samples from two of the faces recovered by Father J.M. Pilón's team in September 1990. The samples, one 30 milligrams, the other 60 milligrams, were subjected to various tests such as granulometric, mineralogical and chemical. According to Carballal, "The result, expressed in extremely abridged form, was that no traces of paint were found at any place." Carballal does not mention which faces were analyzed, nor which part of the faces correspond to each of the samples, nor what kind of mineralogical or chemical analysis was performed.

Chemical Analysis by ICV (%)
	Sample A	Sample B
Zinc	0.96	0.40
Barium	0.02	0.15
Copper	0.01	0.16
Chromium	0.09	0.02
Phosphorus	0.06	0.30
Lead	0.21	0.06

ICV is a respectable institution that belongs to the Spanish National Research Council. in 1992 Pilón published the above chart in the popular Spanish magazine Más Allá.

=== Commentary ===
Luis Ruiz-Noguez believes that the most likely explanation for the visual effect of the Bélmez images is Jordán's suggestion of the use of an oxidizing chemical agent. For example, nitric, sulfuric, muriatic, acetic acid, and others, could be used to obtain such an effect. Another explanation might be the use of agents sensitive to light (which was not mentioned in either Jordán's or Perera's repertoire of forgery hypotheses): silver nitrate which, when subjected to ultraviolet sunlight, darkens.

In general, there may be at least three chemical sources capable of producing an effect similar to that of the Bélmez faces: (1) Products that affect the chemical structure of the cement which include some oxidizing agents and several acids (all types of cement are of alkaline nature and therefore easily attacked by acids); (2) products that leave the cement intact but change their chemical structure upon contact with external agents such as light or chemical reagents; and (3) the utilization of a pigment in a vehicle or resin, as discussed by Ruiz-Noguez in his commentary on the ICV chart.

According to Ramos Perera, hypothesis #3 was the case of the first "wall face" appearance of Bélmez: the ghastly face known as La Pava. Presently this old face is fading out in the dark, humid cement as can be seen in the photographs of a website. Skeptical investigator Joe Nickell has written that the Bélmez Faces were deliberately faked, and the faces looked very amateurish in design.

Brian Dunning of Skeptoid has written that "the faces were shown to have been painted on the concrete floor, the first with paint and later with acid, and the woman living in the house found to be perpetrating a hoax on the public for financial gain."

=== 2014 forensic analysis ===
In 2014, investigative journalism TV show Cuarto Milenio, presented by Iker Jiménez, carried out a technical analysis to discover a possible hoax. The research was realized by José Javier Gracenea, doctor in chemical engineering and general manager of Medco, and Luis Alamancos, forensic criminalist, chairman of Gabinete Pericial Inpeval and director of the Spanish Institute of Applied Criminalistics, later awarded with the European Police Cross of Honor.

After extracting samples from the faces under the house owner's permission, Gracenea proceeded to analyze them and concluded that the images "weren't made with paint" and "according to scientific knowledge and techniques employed in the analysis, there is no external manipulation or elements" in the faces. Alamancos then attempted to reproduce similar images through the variety of methods considered valid in previous investigations, including but not limited to concrete solvents, hydrochloric acid and silver nitrate. He declared failure in his attempt to replicate the faces, concluding "the words summarizing [his] opinion are absolute bewilderment."

== "New" Bélmez faces ==
María Gómez Cámara, the purported psychic that allegedly produced the appearances, died in February 2004 at the age of 85. After her death the popular psychic researcher Pedro Amorós tried to "discover" more thoughtographic appearances in María's house. A new wave of Bélmez faces thus took place. However, Amorós' claims have been debunked in the Spanish media. In November 2004 the newspaper El Mundo published the article "New Bélmez Faces Faked by 'Ghostbusters' and Municipal Government."

In May 2007, journalist Javier Cavanilles and investigator Francisco Máñez published the book Los Caras de Bélmez ("The Scoundrels of Bélmez"), where they explain the history of the scam and pointed to María's son, Diego Pereira, as author of the mysterious paintings.

== See also ==
- List of allegedly haunted locations
- Thoughtography
- Pareidolia
