= Andrew MacKenzie =

Andrew MacKenzie may refer to:

- Andrew Carr MacKenzie (1911–2001), journalist, novelist and parapsychologist from New Zealand
- Andrew Mackenzie (businessman) (born 1956), Chairman of Shell plc
- Andrew Peter Mackenzie (born 1964), physicist

== See also ==
- Andrew McKenzie (disambiguation)
