= Andrew McKenzie =

Andrew or Andy McKenzie may refer to:

- Andrew N. J. McKenzie (fl. 1990s–2020s), British molecular biologist
- Andrew McKenzie (physician) (1887–1951), American physician
- Andrew McKenzie (poet) (1780–1839), poet, see Ulster Scots dialects
- Andrew M. McKenzie (born 1963) British musician, founder of sound art group Hafler Trio
- Andrew McKenzie (bishop) (born 1964), Catholic bishop of Dunkeld, Scotland
- Andy McKenzie (politician) (born 1970), American politician from West Virginia
- Andy McKenzie (American football) (born c. 1973) is an American college football coach.

== See also ==
- Andrew MacKenzie (disambiguation)
