= Sociedad Española de Construcciones Electromecánicas =

Former Spanish metallurgical company

- Spanish Society of Electromechanical Constructions
- Abbreviation: SECEM
- Formation: 1917
- Dissolved: 1978
- Type: S.A.
- Purpose: Metallurgical industry
- Headquarters: Madrid

Sociedad Española de Construcciones Electromecánicas (abbreviated as SECEM), colloquially known as "electro", was a Spanish company in the non-ferrous metals industry that operated between 1917 and 1978. Throughout its existence it was one of the most important Spanish companies in the copper sector, having its main activity in Córdoba. Among its products were copper products, brass, electrical transformers, etc.

== History ==
The company was founded on June 15, 1917, with Spanish-French financial support, with a capital stock of 25 million pesetas. It was born in the context of a boom in Spanish industry, in the heat of the First World War. Two foreign capital companies were involved in its creation, the Sociedad Minera y Metalúrgica de Peñarroya (SMMP) and the Rio Tinto Company Limited (RTC), both of which became shareholders of the new company. (Note: The ''Rio Tinto Company'' participated in its shareholding through a subsidiary, Compañía de Productos Químicos de Huelva (Cano Sanchíz, 2008, p. 364).) The SECEM owned an important plant in Cordoba dedicated to copper metallurgy, brass production, manufacture of motors and electric transformers, etc. Over the years it ended up becoming one of the main companies in the sector, having also a great importance in the local context of Cordoba.

The company came to manufacture nearly 40% of all the electrolytic copper produced in Spain, being supplied to a large extent by the material coming from the Rio Tinto-Nerva mining basin. In this sense, SECEM became an important client of the Compañía Española de Minas de Río Tinto (CEMRT), and later the companies Río Tinto Patiño and Río Tinto Minera would have an important shareholding in SECEM. In spite of this privileged situation, the lack of internal competition meant that the machinery and technology of the Cordovan factory were not modernized, which in the long term would end up causing serious problems for SECEM's economic viability. Towards the end of the 1970s, the industrial crisis had a considerable impact on the copper sector. Taking advantage of this context, in May 1978 SECEM —with the financial support of Banco de Bilbao and Banco Hispano Americano— proceeded to acquire the companies Pradera Hermanos, Sociedad Industrial Asturiana and Earle; at the end of the year, all of these companies formed the conglomerate Ibercobre, which controlled 60% of the copper market.

The SECEM complex in Cordoba remained intact until 1989–1990, after the purchase of Ibercobre by the Finnish company Outokumpu, which decided to split it into three separate industries.

== Railway equipment ==
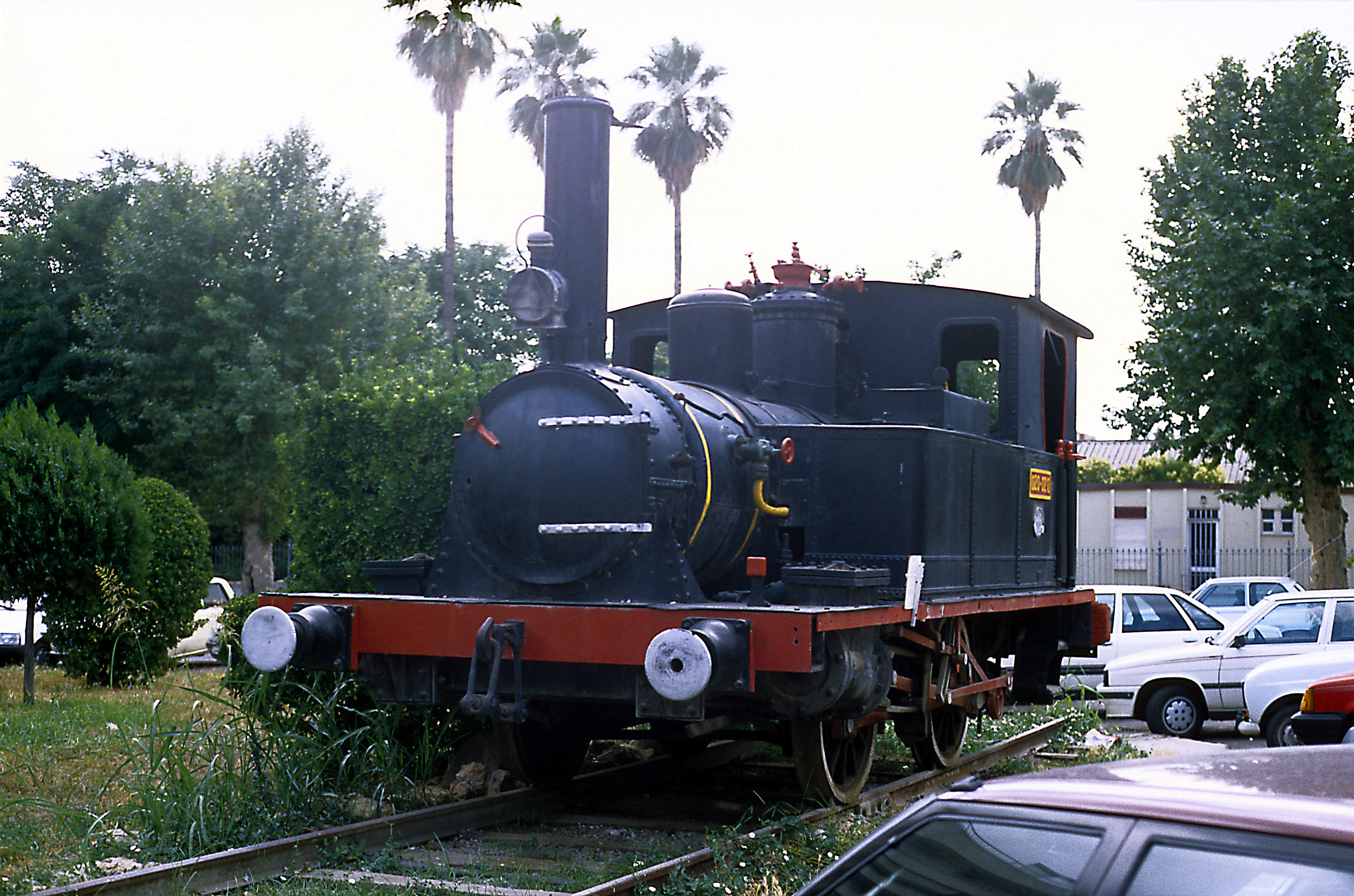
View of the "Santa Rita" locomotive, once used by SECEM.

The SECEM factory in Cordoba was located to the west of the city, next to the route of the Cordoba-Seville and Cordoba-Malaga railway lines, which allowed its production to be transported by rail. For this purpose, an industrial branch and several sidings were set up within the industrial complex. Eventually SECEM acquired two 0-2-0T steam locomotives to take over the shunting and traction work with the freight wagons. One of these engines, acquired in 1963, was the former RENFE 020–0212. It is currently preserved and exhibited in Cordoba.

== Bibliography ==
- Arenas Posadas, Carlos (2017). "Riotinto, el declive de un mito minero (1954-2003)". Revista de Historia Industrial (in Spanish) (69). Barcelona: Universidad de Barcelona: 109–142. ISSN 1132-7200.
- Cano Sanchíz, Juan Manuel (2008). "Arqueología industrial en Córdoba: la Sociedad Española de Construcciones Electromecánicas (primera fase: 1917-1930)". Anales de arqueología cordobesa (in Spanish) (19). Córdoba: Universidad de Córdoba: 361–386. ISSN 1130-9741.
- Carbonell, Antonio (1926). Guía artística de Córdoba (in Spanish). Madrid: Artes de la Ilustración.
- Fernández López, Javier (2006). "Locomotoras de vapor preservadas en España" (PDF). IV Congreso Historia Ferroviaria: Málaga, septiembre de 2006 (in Spanish). Consejería de Obras Públicas y Transportes de la Junta de Andalucía.
- Granda Alva, Germán; Segundo Pérez, Francisca (1983). El cobre. Estructura del mercado internacional e importancia para América Latina y España (in Spanish). Ediciones Cultura Hispánica del Instituto de Cooperación Iberoamericana.
- López-Morell, Miguel A. (2016). The House of Rothschild in Spain, 1812–1941. Routledge.
- Pascual Domenech, Pere (2008). "La industria del cobre en España II: de 1976 a 2005". Revista de Historia Industrial (in Spanish) (38). Barcelona: Universidad de Barcelona: 115–159. ISSN 1132-7200.
- Porro Herrera, María José; Sánchez Dueñas, Blas (2010). Vanguardias literarias en Córdoba, 1914-1936 (in Spanish). Córdoba: Diputación Provincial de Córdoba.
