= University of Córdoba (Spain) =

Public university in Córdoba, Andalusia, Spain

Coordinates: 37°53′05″N 4°47′18″W

- Universidad de Córdoba
- Type: Public
- Established: 1972
- Rector: José Carlos Gómez Villamandos
- Academic staff: 1,429 (2010)
- Students: 15,000 (2010)
- Location: Córdoba, Andalusia, Spain
- Campus: Córdoba and Bélmez
- Website: www.uco.es

University rankings

Global – Overall
- ARWU World: 901–1000 (2023)
- QS World: 951-1000 (2026)
- THE World: 601–800 (2024)
- USNWR Global: =912 (2023)

The University of Córdoba (Spanish: Universidad de Córdoba, UCO), is a university in Córdoba, in Andalusia, Spain, chartered in 1972. It offers undergraduate and postgraduate studies in humanities, social sciences, health sciences, natural sciences and engineering.

== History ==
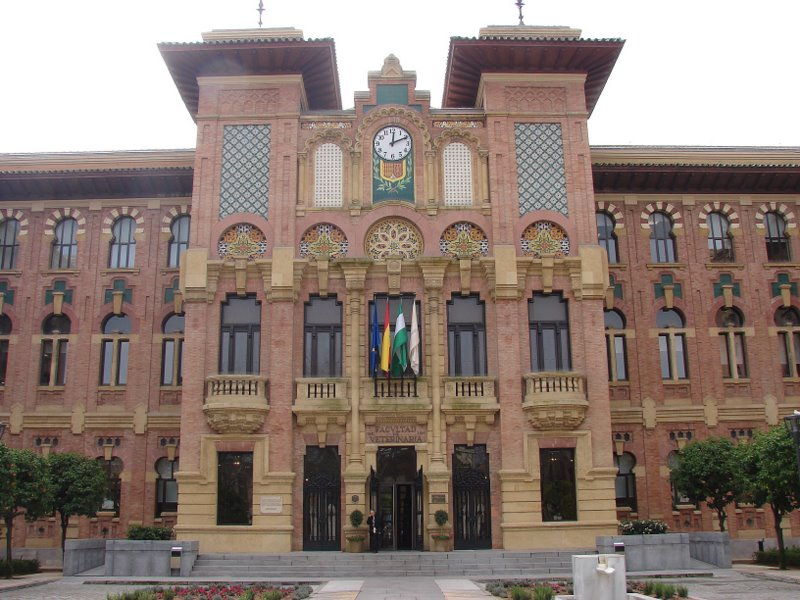
Rectorate building of the University of Córdoba.

Although it was established in 1972, UCO is the inheritor of the Free University of Córdoba (Universidad Libre de Córdoba), which operated in the province in the late 19th century. Centenary institutions like the Faculty of Veterinary Science depend on UCO.

UCO stands out for its specialization in natural sciences, offering degrees in chemistry, biology, environmental sciences and agronomic and forest engineering. It is also specialized in health sciences, offering degrees in nursing and medicine, closely linked to the Reina Sofía University Hospital, and in humanities (history, art history, teacher training, philosophy, and diverse liberal arts degrees).

The university is structured in three main campuses: the Humanities and Legal and Social Sciences Campus, integrated in the urban center; the Health Sciences Campus, in the west of the city; and the Agrifood, Science and Technology campus of Rabanales, in the east of the city. UCO also contains the Polytechnic School of Bélmez, situated seventy kilometres away from Córdoba, where Mining Engineering and Public Works Technical Engineering degrees are offered.

== Campuses and structure ==
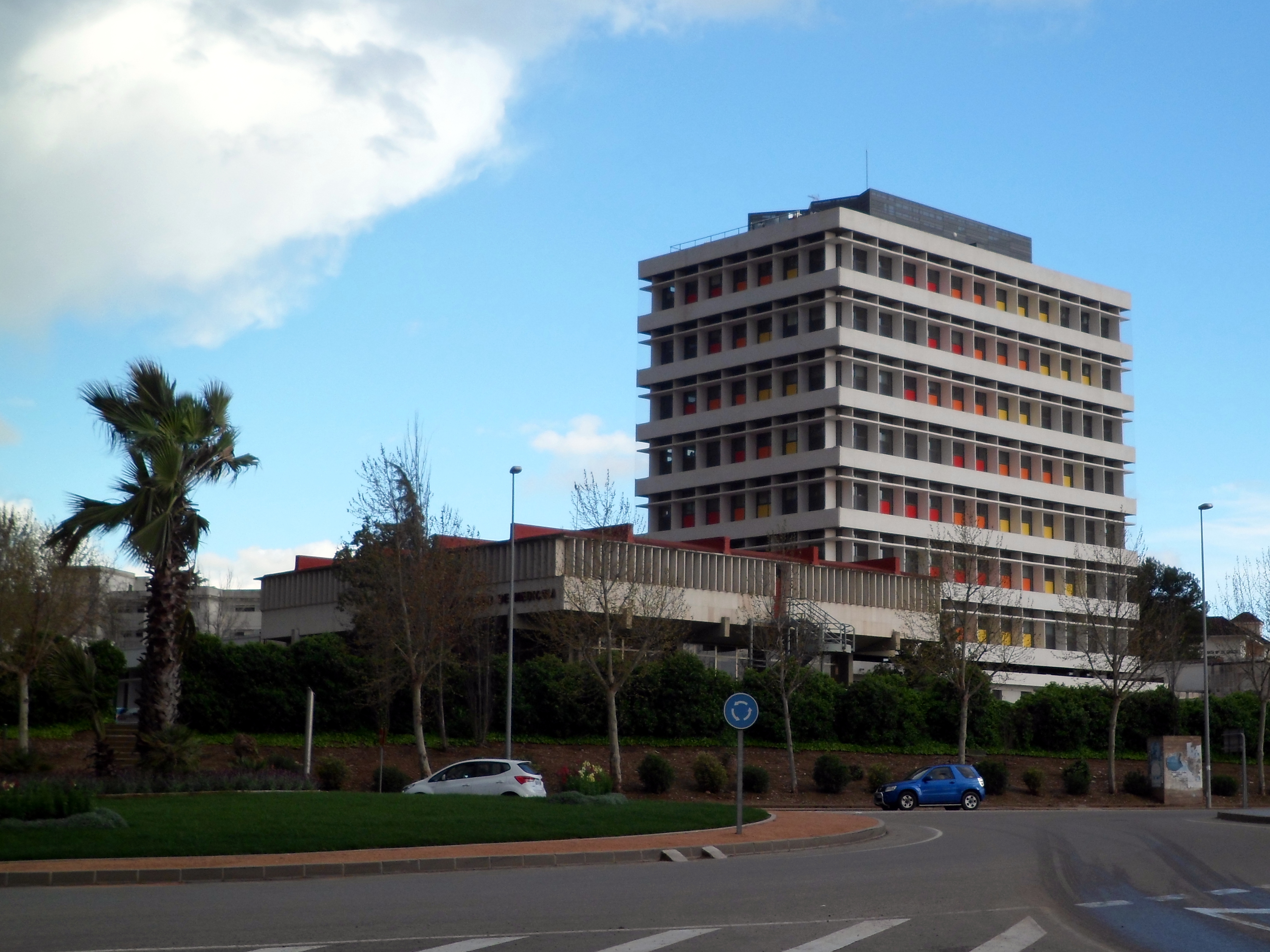
Faculty of Medicine.

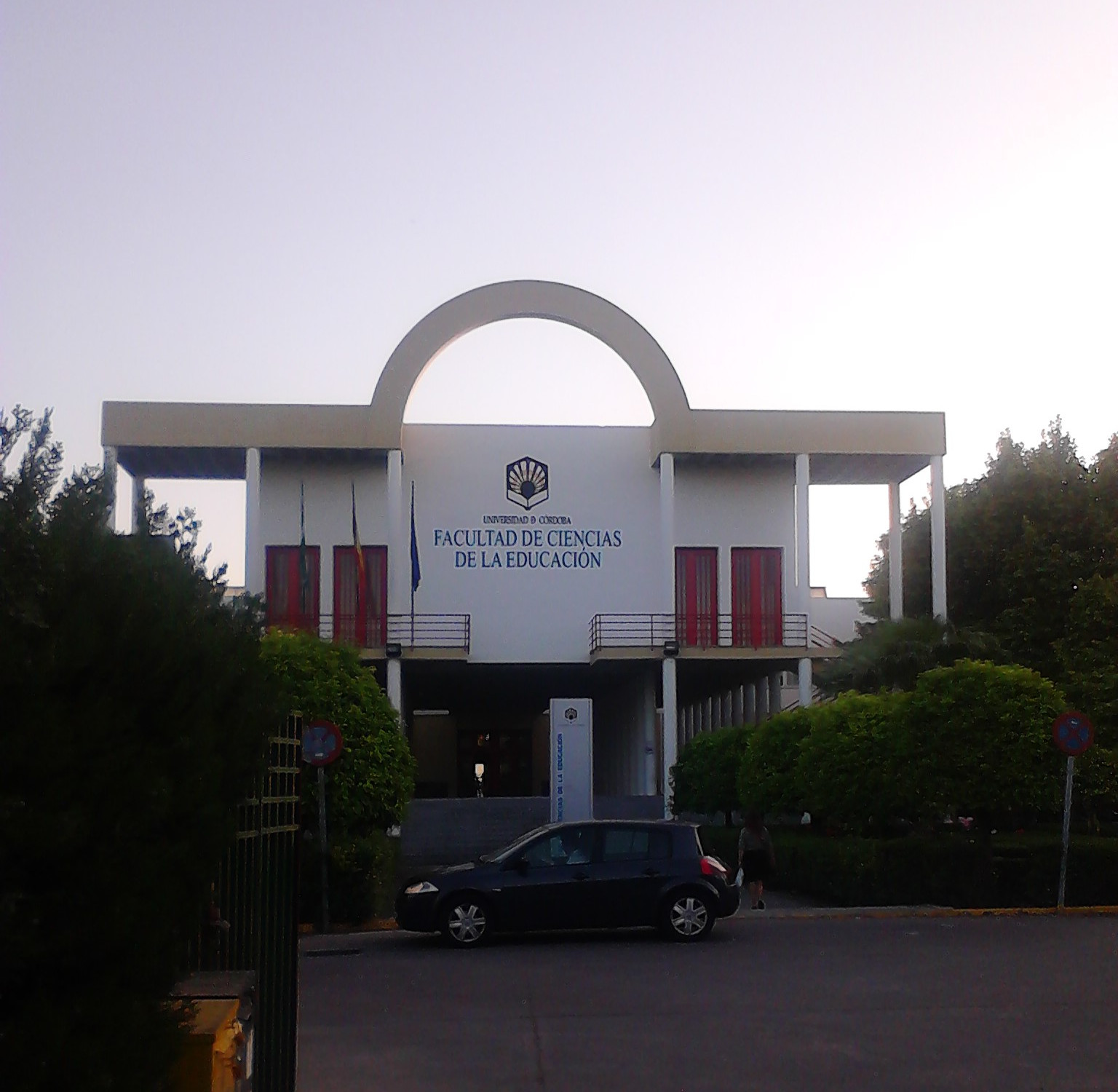
Faculty of Education Sciences.

The university has four campuses, three in the city of Córdoba and one in Bélmez.

=== Rabanales Campus ===
- Faculty of Veterinary Science
- Higher Technical School of Agricultural and Forest Engineering
- Faculty of Sciences
- Higher Polytechnic School

=== Menéndez Pidal Campus ===
- Faculty of Medicine
- School of Nursing

=== City Centre Campus ===
- Faculty of Law and Business and Economic Sciences
- Faculty of Labour Science
- Faculty of Philosophy and Letters
- Faculty of Education Sciences

=== Bélmez Campus ===
- Higher Polytechnic School of Bélmez

== Research centres ==
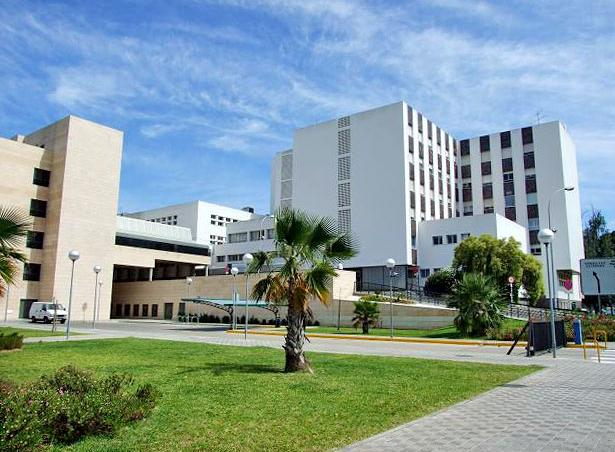
Reina Sofía University Hospital.

- European Documentation Centre
- Andalusian Experimental Centre of Animal Health
- Veterinary Clinic Hospital
- Spanish Network of Aerobiology
- Reina Sofía University Hospital
- Royal Botanic Garden of Córdoba
- Andalusian Inter-University Institute of Criminology
- Andalusian Centre of Apiculture
