= Sierra Boyera Reservoir =

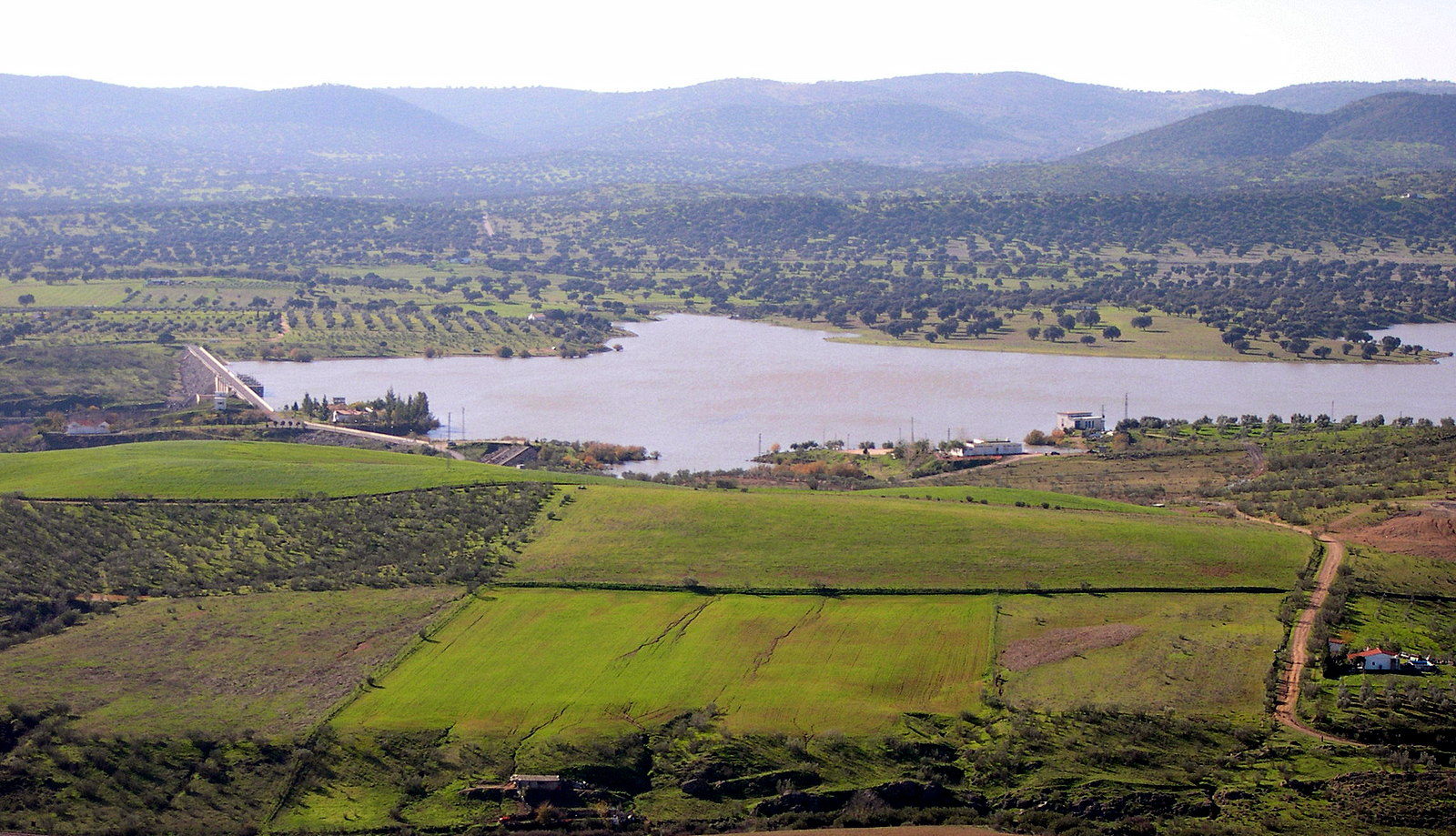

- Location within Andalusia
- Location: Bélmez
- Coordinates: 38°16′22″N 5°14′58″W
- Type: reservoir
- Primary inflows: Guadiato River
- Basin countries: Spain
- Built: 1973

Sierra Boyera Reservoir is a Spanish reservoir located within the municipal boundaries of Belmez, Peñarroya-Pueblonuevo and Fuente Obejuna, in the province of Córdoba, Andalusia.

The reservoir was built between 1969 and 1974, and began its operation in 1983.

== See also ==
- List of reservoirs and dams in Andalusia
