= Peñarroya-Pueblonuevo =

- Municipality
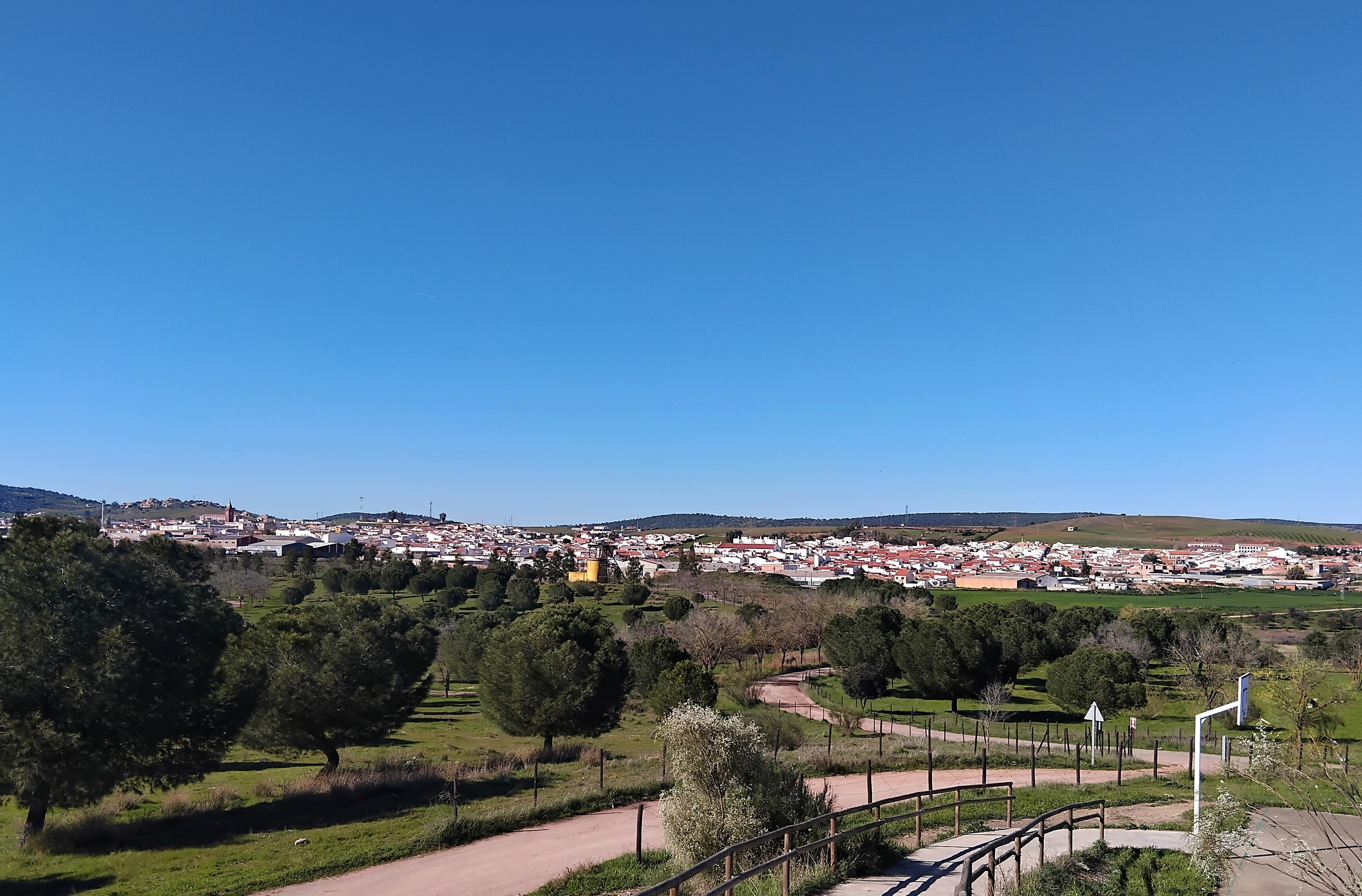

- Seal

- Location within Spain Location within Andalusia Location within Province of Córdoba (Spain)
- Coordinates: 38°18′N 5°16′W
- Country: Spain
- Province: Córdoba
- Comarca: Valle del Guadiato

Area
  - Total: 63 km^{2} (24 sq mi)
- Elevation: 537 m (1,762 ft)

Population (2025-01-01)
  - Total: 10,244
  - Density: 160/km^{2} (420/sq mi)
- Time zone: UTC+1 (CET)
  - Summer (DST): UTC+2 (CEST)

Peñarroya-Pueblonuevo is a Municipality located in the province of Córdoba, Spain. According to the 2024 census, the municipality has a population of 10,289 inhabitants. Its postal code is 14200. It is a former mining town located in the Sierra Morena, at the northern end of Córdoba Province near Extremadura. It is the administrative center of the comarca Valle del Guadiato.

The origins of the municipality date back to the 19th century, when mining activity in the area was in full swing. Originally, they were two independent municipalities, "Peñarroya" and "Pueblonuevo del Terrible", which had separated from the municipality of Belmez. It wasn't until 1927 when both localities were merged into a single one, called "Peñarroya-Pueblonuevo". For several decades, it was one of the main industrial and mining centers in the province of Córdoba, also boasting a significant population.

== History ==
The oldest mention of the place "Peñarroya" dates back to 1272, during the reign of Alfonso X. Mining had a certain tradition in this area and reached its peak in the 19th century. Towards the end of the century, in 1881 the Sociedad Minera y Metalúrgica de Peñarroya (SMMP) was founded with French capital, and its activities would become of great importance. In addition to mining activities, a major industrial center developed in the area with several factories and some railway lines were built.

The name of the present-day town originated in the merger of the towns of Peñarroya and Pueblonuevo del Terrible in 1927. Pueblonuevo del Terrible was founded in the 19th century during the mining boom. The town had its name from a fierce dog that had lived there in the past and according to a local legend, he discovered the charcoal in the area. The dog had been nicknamed "Terrible".

The Battle of Peñarroya took place between 5 January and 4 February 1939 towards the end of the Spanish Civil War in the area of the town, which was located near the Extremaduran front line.

During the second half of the 20th century, mining and industrial activities in the area suffered an inexorable decline. As a result, Peñarroya-Pueblonuevo lost population and importance.

== See also ==
- List of municipalities in Córdoba
- Sierra Boyera Reservoir

== Bibliography ==
- García Parody, Manuel Ángel (2009). El Germinal del sur: conflictos mineros en el Alto Guadiato, 1881-1936 (in Spanish). Seville: Centro de Estudios Andaluces.
- Trujillo, Jorge Juan (2016). Minas de San Quintín (1884-1934) (in Spanish). Ciudad Real: Diputación Provincial de Ciudad Real.
