= Belmez, Córdoba =

Coordinates: 38°16′20″N 5°12′31″W

Belmez
- city
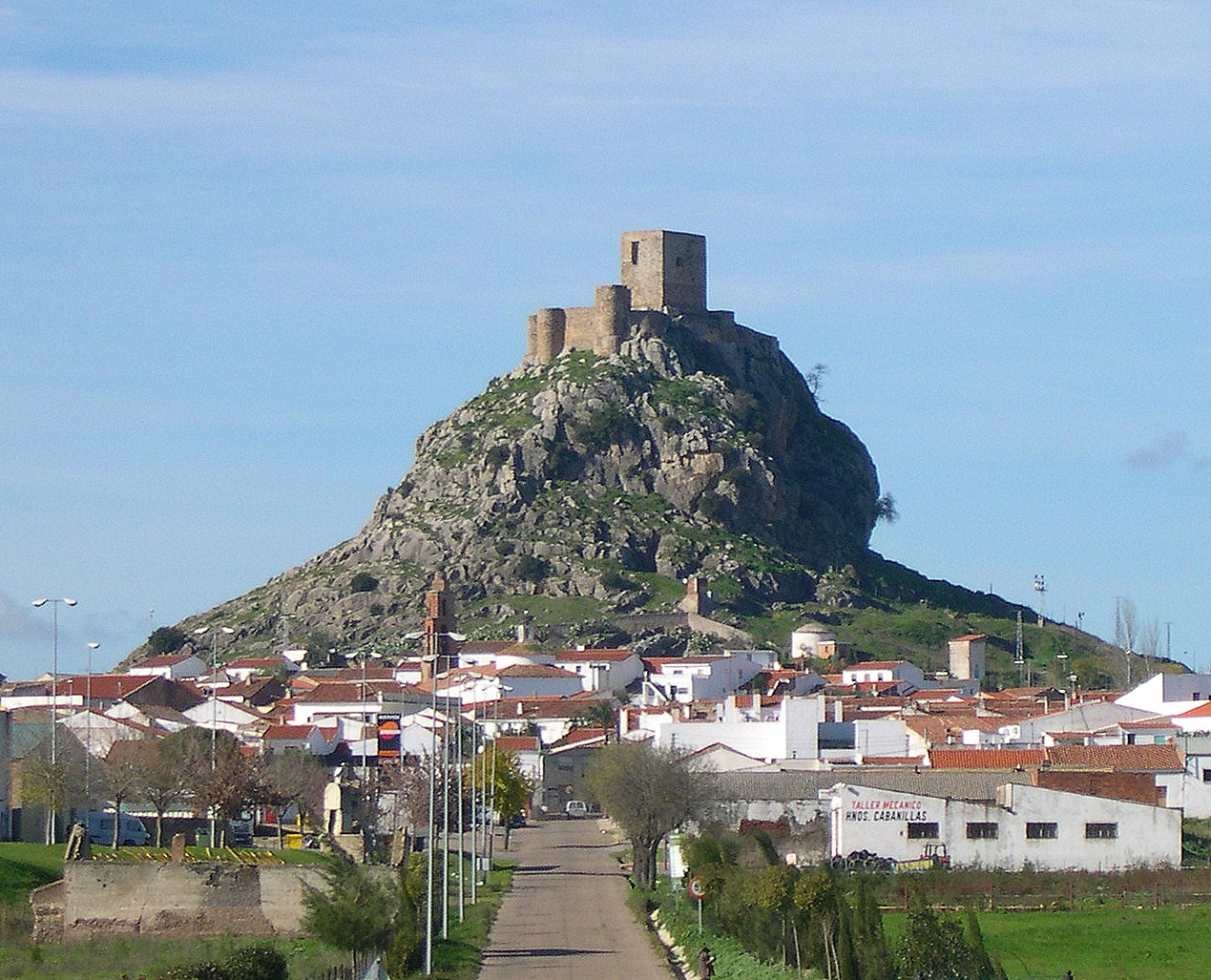
- View of Belmez

- Seal

- Location in Spain.
- Country: Spain
- Autonomous community: Andalusia
- Province: Córdoba

Area
  - Total: 207 km^{2} (80 sq mi)
- Elevation: 532 m (1,745 ft)

Population (2025-01-01)
  - Total: 2,833
  - Density: 13.7/km^{2} (35.4/sq mi)
- Time zone: UTC+1 (CET)
  - Summer (DST): UTC+2 (CEST)
- Website: https://belmez.es/

Belmez is a village and municipality with 2833 (2025-01-01) inhabitants in Córdoba, Andalucia, Spain.

Belmez is known for its old coal mines, which were in operation for many years and were the main source of income for the village. For this reason, the Practical School for Miners was founded in 1924. It has now become a polytechnic school training civil engineers, energy resource engineers, and mining engineers.

== History ==
The settlement emerged after the Reconquista around an existing castle on a hill. It formed an administrative unit with the neighboring Fuente Obejuna until 1250, after which it was divided. Following the territorial division instituted in 1833 and the creation of the provinces as a new administrative unit, Belmez ceased to belong to the old Kingdom of Jaén and became part of the province of Córdoba.

Since the mid-19th century, mining has been the main economic driver of Belmez. Companies such as the "Sociedad Hullera y Metalúrgica de Belmez" established themselves in the area to exploit the surrounding deposits. The latter's activities were overshadowed by the Sociedad Minera y Metalúrgica de Peñarroya (SMMP), which had become the dominant company by the end of the 19th century.

The development of mining brought an increase in the population, exceeding 10,000 inhabitants in the 1870s. Several railway lines were built to facilitate the export of mined coal to other areas. The first of these was the Almorchón-Belmez line, inaugurated in 1868. As a result, Belmez became an important railway center with several train stations. From the mid-20th century onwards, mining activity declined, marking the economic decline of the area.

== Monuments ==
- Castle of Belmez

== See also ==
- List of municipalities in Córdoba
- Sierra Boyera Reservoir

== Bibliography ==
- García Parody, Manuel Ángel (2009). El Germinal del sur: conflictos mineros en el Alto Guadiato, 1881-1936 (in Spanish). Seville: Centro de Estudios Andaluces.
- Wais, Francisco (1974). Historia de los Ferrocarriles Españoles (in Spanish). Madrid: Editora Nacional.
