= Bélmez de la Moraleda =

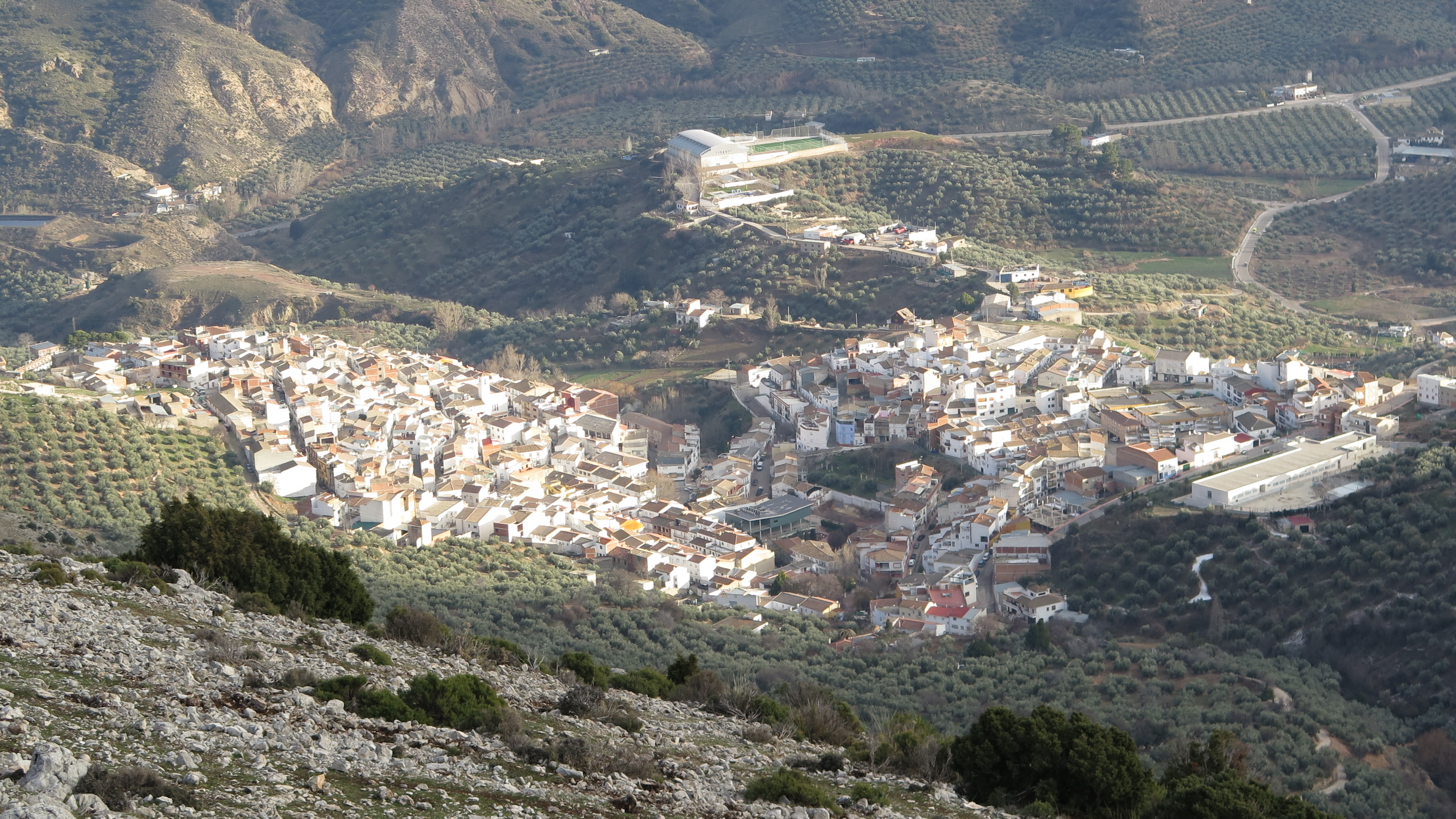

- Coat of arms

- Location in the Province of Jaén Bélmez de la Moraleda (Andalusia) Bélmez de la Moraleda (Spain)
- Coordinates: 37°43′N 03°22′W
- Country: Spain
- Autonomous community: Andalusia
- Province: Jaén
- Comarca: Sierra Mágina

Government
  - Mayor: Pedro Justicia Herrera

Area
  - Total: 49 km^{2} (19 sq mi)
- Elevation: 825 m (2,707 ft)

Population (2025-01-01)
  - Total: 1,504
  - Density: 31/km^{2} (79/sq mi)
- Demonym: Belmoralenses
- Time zone: UTC+1 (CET)
  - Summer (DST): UTC+2 (CEST)
- Website: Official website

Bélmez de la Moraleda, or simply Bélmez, is a town located in the province of Jaén, Andalusia, southern Spain. It had a population of 1,509 inhabitants in 2024.

Bélmez is well known as the location for a famous house purported to be haunted by apparitions that manifest as images of human faces in the foundation.

== See also ==
- List of municipalities in Jaén
