= Sociedad Minera y Metalúrgica de Peñarroya =

Former French mining company (1881-1988)

Société minière et métallurgique de Peñarroya (SMMP)
- Peñarroya Mining and Metallurgical Society
- Sociedad Minera y Metalúrgica de Peñarroya
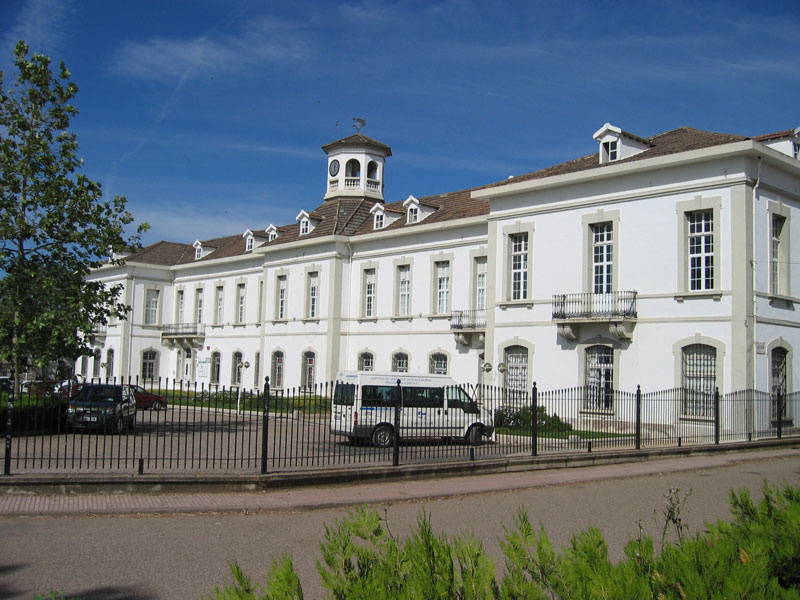
- Former SMMP headquarters in Peñarroya.
- Formation: 1881
- Dissolved: 1988
- Type: S.A.
- Purpose: Metallurgical industry
- Headquarters: Paris, Peñarroya
- Main organ: Imétal (1974-1988)

Sociedad Minera y Metalúrgica de Peñarroya (in French: Société minière et métallurgique de Peñarroya), usually abbreviated as SMMP, was a French-owned multinational mining company that operated between 1881 and 1989. During its existence it had an important presence in Spain.

Founded in 1881, the company began operations in southern Spain. The company's mining activity was mainly focused on the extraction of coal and lead, although it also reached other industrial fields such as metallurgy, chemical industry, electricity production, railroads, etc. In the case of Spain, it came to control numerous mines and its activity extended throughout the provinces of Cordoba, Jaen, Ciudad Real, Murcia, and Barcelona. In addition to Spain and France, the company was also present in other territories, such as Belgium, Italy, Greece and North Africa.

The decline of the company's activities in Spain began in the 1960s, with the closure of its Peñarroya facilities in 1970. However, some fields were still in operation. In 1968 the Spanish section was restructured and renamed "Sociedad Minera y Metalúrgica de Peñarroya-España" (SMMP-E), a name it kept until its disappearance in 1988–1989.

== History ==
=== Origins and consolidation ===
The "Peñarroya" company was founded on October 6, 1881, by the French engineer Charles Ledoux. SMMP was founded in Paris by means of an agreement signed between the House of Rothschild and the French company Sociedad Hullera y Metalúrgica de Belmez (CHMB), the latter already present in the Peñarroya-Belmez-Espiel coal basin. Ledoux was the main architect of the foundation of the company, interested in grouping the different mining interests in the area. Initially, it was agreed that CHMB would continue with its exploitation of the coal basins while SMMP would engage in lead mining and metallurgy. In a short time the activities of the new company grew exponentially, to the point that between 1885 and 1889 lead and silver production tripled. Paradoxically, although the SMMP had originally been founded as a "little sister" of the CHMB, on June 22, 1893, the latter was absorbed by the "Peñarroya" company.

The company's head office was located at 12 Place Vendôme, Paris, although it also had another head office in Peñarroya.

=== Years of apogee ===
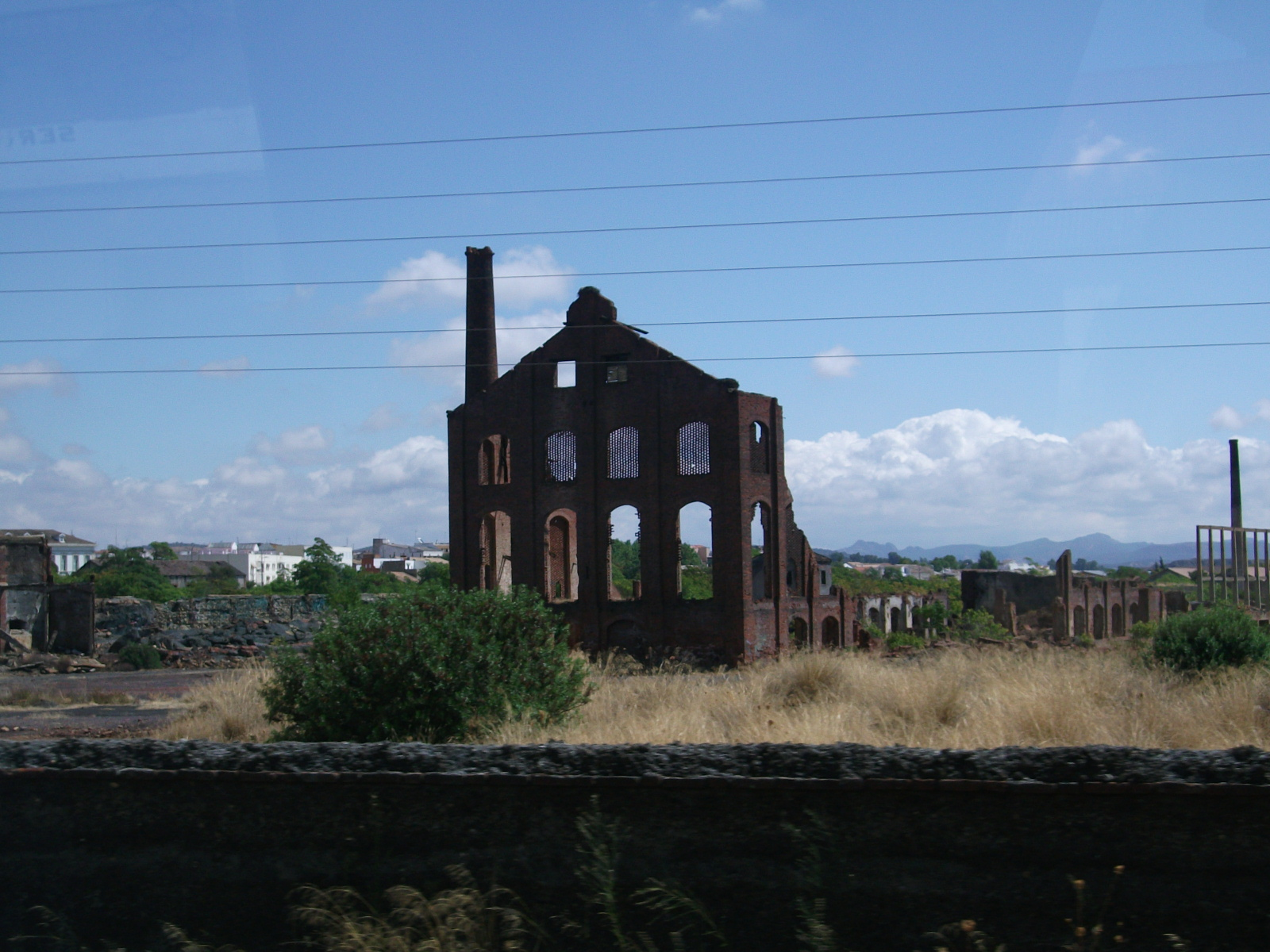
Ruins of the SMMP Industrial Enclosure in Peñarroya-Pueblonuevo.

From the beginning of the 20th century, the company started an important expansion, enlarging its mines and facilities. In 1900 it acquired the mines in the Alto Guadiato valley that were owned by the Compañía de los Ferrocarriles Andaluces, a purchase that was not very costly for SMMP because at that time "Andaluces" was going through a bad economic situation. That same year the company also acquired eight mines scattered in the area of El Terrible and Santa Elisa, one of which would turn out to be of extraordinary mineral wealth. In 1911 it bought again new mining deposits scattered in different areas, thus gaining a dominant position in the market. By that time SMMP was also exploiting mining deposits in the provinces of Badajoz (Azuaga, Fuente del Arco) and Ciudad Real (Puertollano, San Quintín). By 1914, "Peñarroya" had become the second largest coal producer in Spain.

The importance of SMMP was such that a large part of the land in the municipality of Peñarroya was owned by the company, and in fact the company donated some land for the construction of the Civil Guard barracks, the Town Hall, the telephone exchange, etc. The SMMP itself was even in charge of issues such as the municipal water supply. In addition to the mining operations, the company's business in the Peñarroya-Belmez area included a lead smelter, a zinc factory, a sulfuric acid factory, an oleum factory, several thermoelectric production plants, a superphosphate factory, etc.

The production of "Peñarroya" experienced an upward trend during the course of the First World War due to the increase in demand from the belligerent countries, which would lead to a significant increase in its income. In 1917 the SMMP participated together with the Rio Tinto Company Limited and other actors in the foundation of the Sociedad Española de Construcciones Electromecánicas (SECEM), to whose factory in Cordoba the Peñarroya company would supply electric energy. By 1920 the "Peñarroya" company had an estimated capital of 28,430,863 pesetas, at a time when it was one of the main companies operating in Spain. A reflection of this is the fact that the company came to have its own railway network, which connected its main facilities in the provinces of Cordoba and Ciudad Real. In the 1930s, SMMP also started the synthetic production of oil through the distillation of oil shale. It even set up a distillation plant in Puertollano, from whose production up to four million liters of gasoline, 400,000 liters of lubricants and some 1,300 tons of asphalts were obtained at the time.

At the beginning of the 1930s the "Peñarroya" company was at its peak. In 1931 the group's profits in Spanish territory were around twelve million pesetas, largely thanks to the investments made in Spanish companies. But it was also from this date that the company began a policy of diversification and relocation of its facilities to other areas. After the outbreak of the Civil War in 1936, Peñarroya's main facilities were briefly occupied by the trade unions and workers' militias, who made themselves strong in the Guadiato area. This situation was short-lived, as a few months later the rebel army occupied the mining basin and the company regained control of the facilities.

In the 1950s the company acquired the Cartagena-La Unión facilities, reactivating the mining production in the area, although "Peñarroya" was already a shareholder of the parent company that operated the mines. Under the aegis of the SMMP, the construction of the "Roberto" washery began in 1952, and modern machinery was introduced for the mining works. The mines in the area experienced a boom period thanks to the mechanization of the workings, reaching high productivity and yields. Between 1957 and 1980, lead production increased fourfold, while silver production increased threefold. The main activities would end up being concentrated in the "Santa Lucía" smelter, whose facilities underwent a complete modernization between 1966 and 1970. "Santa Lucía" became the largest lead smelter in Spain and the second largest in Europe, accounting for 66% of Spanish lead production in the 1970s.

=== Multinational company ===
Throughout its existence, SMMP's activities spread throughout Europe, Africa and South America, giving rise to a multinational company.

In metropolitan France, the first operations were quite late compared to its activities in Spain. In 1917 "Peñarroya" obtained the concession of the lead deposits of Pierrefitte, in the department of Hautes-Pyrénées, but the works would not start until 1940. A similar situation occurred at the mines of La Plagne, in the Haute-Savoie region, and Orb, in Vaucluse. The three mines remained active with various vicissitudes until 1969, 1973 and 1954, respectively. The fields in the Largentière district in Ardèche, which were in operation from 1964 to 1988 with high productivity, performed better. (Note: During this period, 340,000 tons of lead, 65,000 tons of zinc and 700 tons of silver were mined.) In addition to Spain, within the Mediterranean basin, the "Peñarroya" company also developed its activities in Greece and Italy. In Greece it exploited the famous Laurion mines through a subsidiary, the Compagnie française du Laurium, from the 19th century until its closure in 1977. In the case of Italy, for many years the Sardinian mines were the main center of activity of SMMP in the country. Later the French company would operate through a subsidiary, Pertrusola, which throughout the 1960s and 1970s exploited various deposits throughout the peninsula: the mines of Raibl (Udine), Salafossa (Piave), Crotona (Calabria) and Vado Ligure (Liguria).

In Africa, SMMP had an intense geological research activity in several countries, especially in Morocco, where several deposits, smelters, washing plants, etc. were in operation. From 1950 onwards it associated with other companies to exploit several mines, maintaining its activities in the Maghreb country until 1975. "Peñarroya was also active in South America since 1950, mainly in Chile and Brazil. In the Andean country it became associated in 1951 with the mining company of M'Zaita, of French capital, which it absorbed in 1960. Its activities were concentrated around the La Disputada and El Soldado mines, as well as the Chagres smelter, working mainly copper. The deposits and facilities were unified under a single subsidiary, the company "Disputada", which remained under the control of SMMP until the early 1970s. In Brazil, it assumed the technical management of several mining operations and came to own two smelters.

=== Decline and disappearance ===
By the end of the 1950s, SMMP's activities in the Peñarroya-Belmez area were in decline. Previously, during the post-war years, "Peñarroya" had ceded to Empresa Nacional Calvo Sotelo (ENCASO) its oil shale exploitations in the Puertollano area. In 1961, the SMMP transferred the ownership of the coal basins of Peñarroya-Belmez and Puertollano to the Instituto Nacional de Industria (INI), after having announced its intention to cease its activities in this sector. In 1961 it created the companies ENCASUR and ENECO with the objective of producing electricity based on local coal. At the beginning, SMMP had a 17% shareholding in ENCASUR. In 1968 all the Spanish businesses of "Peñarroya" adopted their own entity and were renamed "Sociedad Minera y Metalúrgica de Peñarroya-España" (SMMP-E), having from then on its headquarters in Madrid and having a separate organization. (Note: The SMMP-E was chaired by Luis Lamana Lizarbe and included the presence of such figures as Luis Figueroa y Pérez de Guzmán de Guzmán —Count of Romanones— and Carlos Figueroa Castillejo —Marquis of San Damián— as board members. At the time of its incorporation, the subsidiary company had a capital of 700 million pesetas (Martínez Carrión, 2002, p. 513).) These changes were similar to those operating in the French metropolis, since in 1974 the "Peñarroya" company joined other historic French mining companies —Le Nickel and Mokta— to form the Imétal conglomerate.

In 1970 the Peñarroya-Pueblonuevo facilities were closed and abandoned. By 1980 SMMP-E maintained its main activity in the Sierra Minera de Cartagena-La Unión, which by then had become Spain's leading lead producing center. But by the end of the 1980s, the mining crisis and the accumulation of losses led the historic company to an unsustainable situation. In 1988, the Imétal conglomerate was eventually integrated into the new Metaleurop group. The parent company decided to liquidate a large part of its Spanish division. In 1988 the Cartagena mining facilities were sold to a real estate developer, Portmán Golf, which would end up closing the mines in 1991.

== Railway network and equipment ==
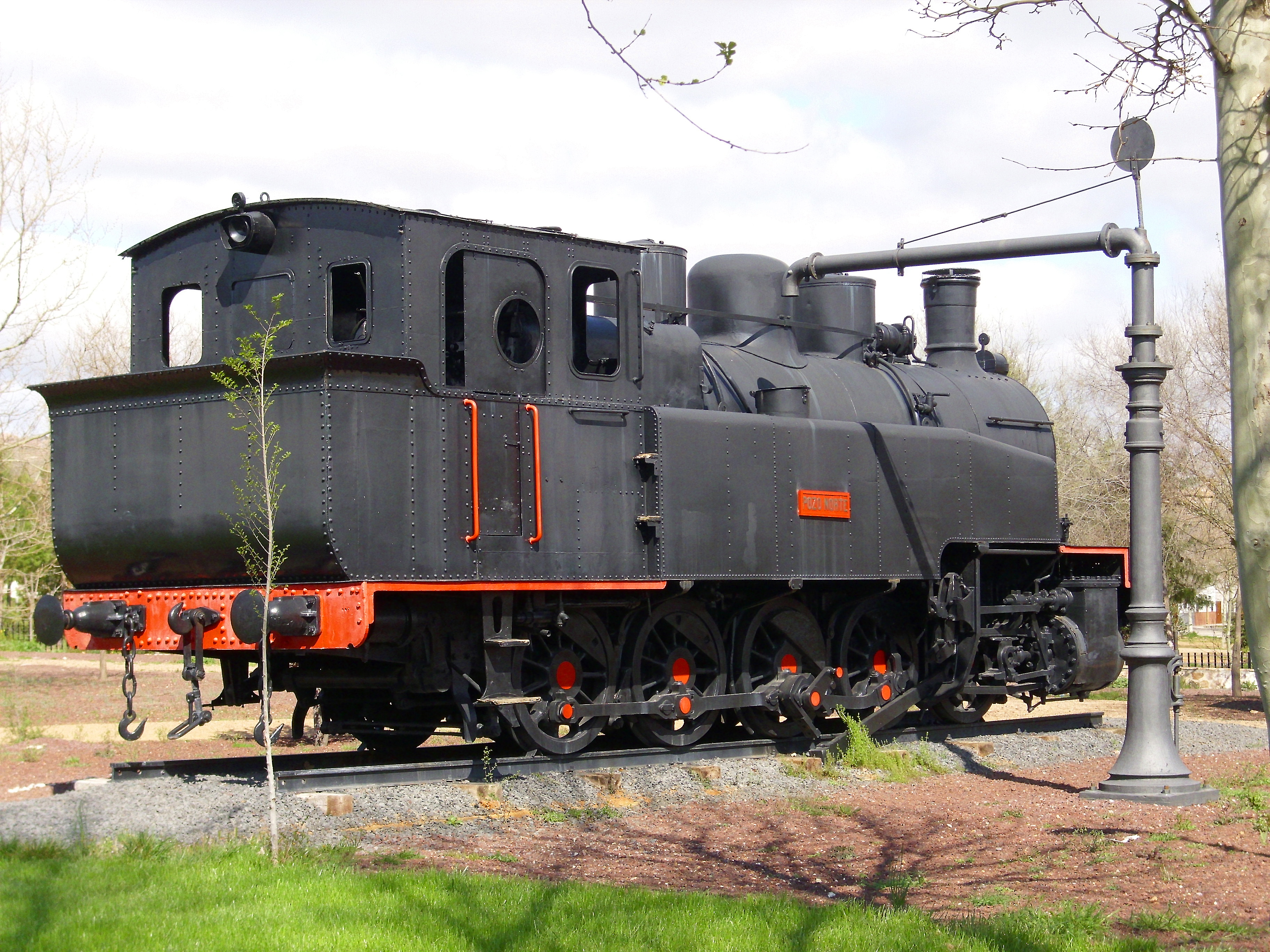
Former broad gauge locomotive used by SMMP in its Puertollano mines.

During the first third of the 20th century, SMMP owned mining deposits and installations that extended throughout the regions of Peñarroya-Belmez, Horcajo and Puertollano. For this reason, the company built a railroad from Peñarroya to Fuente del Arco and Puertollano, with a length of 216 kilometers. Another railroad line was also built to the San Quintín mines. With this, all the company's mining sites were connected by railroad. In 1924 SMMP transferred the control and administration of the railway network to Compañía de los Ferrocarriles de Peñarroya y Puertollano, a subsidiary of SMMP.

In order to operate all this network of lines, the company "Peñarroya" had a large fleet of narrow-gauge vehicles and engines. It also had a fleet of broad gauge locomotives to operate on the branches that connected its different deposits and industrial exploitations with the Iberian-gauge railway network. The main traffic of its lines was the transport of goods, especially minerals, although it also offered passenger services.

== See also ==
- The Year of the Discovery

== Bibliography ==
- Arias González, Luis (2003). Socialismo y vivienda obrera en España (1926-1939) (in Spanish). Universidad de Salamanca. ISBN 84-7800-797-0.
- Caruana de las Cagigas, Leonardo (2009). "Los difíciles orígenes de la industria petrolera española" (PDF). Revista empresa y humanismo (in Spanish). 12 (I). Pamplona: Universidad de Navarra: 13–62. ISSN 1139-7608.
- Castilla Rubio, Conrado (2003). "Importancia e influencia de la línea férrea Peñarroya-Puertollano en Los Pedroches". Actas del III Congreso de Historia de Andalucía. Córdoba, 2001 (PDF) (in Spanish). Córdoba: Cajasur. Obra Social y Cultural. pp. 37–48. ISBN 84-7959-463-2.
- Denéchère, Yves (1999). La politique espagnole de la France de 1931 à 1936. Une pratique française de rapports inégaux (in French). París: L'Harmattan.
- García Parody, Manuel Ángel (2009). El Germinal del sur: conflictos mineros en el Alto Guadiato, 1881-1936 (in Spanish). Seville: Centro de Estudios Andaluces.
- Hernando, J.L. (2017). "El ferrocarril Peñarroya-Puertollano, nexo arteril de la minería y la metalurgia en Sierra Morena central (1904-1970)". Patrimonio geológico y minero: Una apuesta por el desarrollo local sostenible (in Spanish). In: Emilio Romero Macías (dir.). Universidad de Huelva: 205–212.
- López-Morell, Miguel A. (2003). Peñarroya, un modelo expansivo de corporación minero-industrial 1881-1936 (PDF) (in Spanish). Barcelona: Revista de historia industrial. pp. 95–135. ISSN 1132-7200.
- —— (2016). The House of Rothschild in Spain, 1812–1941. Routledge.
- López-Morell, Miguel Ángel; Pérez de Perceval, Miguel Ángel; Sánchez, Alejandro (2006). Minería y desarrollo económico en España (in Spanish). Madrid: Editorial Síntesis.
- Martínez Carrión, José Miguel (2002). Economía de la Región de Murcia (in Spanish). Murcia: Editora Regional de Murcia.
- Rábano, Isabel; Manteca, Ignacio; García, Cristóbal (2003). Patrimonio geológico y minero y desarrollo regional (in Spanish). Madrid: Instituto Geológico y Minero de España.
- Routhier, Pierre (1999). Voyage au monde du métal. Inventions et aventures (in French). Belin.
- Troly, Gilbert (2008). "La société minière et métallurgique de Penarroya" (PDF). Annales des Mines - Réalités Industrielles (in French) (3). Annales des Mines. Paris: FFE: 27–34. doi:10.3917/rindu.083.0027. ISSN 1148-7941.
- Wais, Francisco (1974). Historia de los ferrocarriles españoles (in Spanish). Madrid: Editora Nacional.

== Further information ==
- Díaz-Villaseñor, Alberto (2005). Encasur se creó en 1961 para sustituir a la francesa SMMP (in Spanish). Córdova.
- Rocamora, José (1992). "Peñarroya cierra la última fundición de plomo en España". El País (in Spanish).
