= AE-COPSD European Police Cross of Honor =

Association Européenne de membres des Corps et Organismes Publics de Sécurité et de Défense
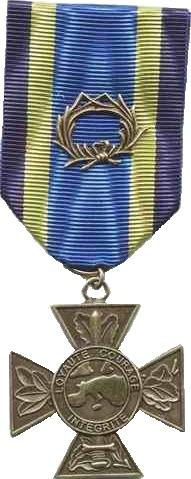
- European Police Cross of Honour in Bronze with Honorary Device
- Type: Police Decoration
- Awarded for: Valour or Meritorious Service
- Description: Comes in three classes: Gold, Silver, and Bronze
- Presented by: AE-COPSD
- Eligibility: Police Officers
- Status: Currently awarded
- Established: 04 December 1981
- European Police Cross of Honour Ribbon

The European Police Cross of Honour is an honorary medal of the European Association of the Bodies and Public Organisations of Security and Defence in France by Decree: N° 81-1103 on 4 December 1981. As by legal definition, the medal is to be worn on the left side, mounted alongside any other medals.

== Eligibility ==
Recipient of the Cross of Honour: All member of a public safety forces (Federal officers, Local Policemen or Military police officers, or other public safety and security personnel, that are active, reserve, and/or retired. Has been a help to the European community, must be serving or having served with honour, loyalty, integrity, and courage during the course of their career, is the only way to be eligible for the European Policeman Cross of Honour. The European Police Cross of Honour can be awarded to exceptional police officers of non-European countries by maintaining the quoted preconditions above, and there citation has to be presented by two members of the AE-COPSD.

== Achievement conditions ==
No one may be awarded this honorary distinction, if they do not present all the values of morality and integrity need for the award. A candidates nominations can be sent directly to the reward committee on a suggestion memo. Informational documents that has justify its values of the award with the highest of merits.

== Achievement methods ==
The European Police Cross of Honour is normally awarded by a committee. If not nominated by a member of the awards committee, they look into the candidate's service history. The committee must have documentation on official unit or department letter head (preferable with an ink stamp), stating that the candidate does not have any negative remarks on their service record. It must be written by the candidates section chief. The committee decisions are final and irrevocable.

=== Exceptional candidates ===
An exceptional candidate is any police officer who is wounded in the line of duty, saves the life of a member of the public, captures a top wanted criminal, or is killed in the line of duty. Their actions in one of the following circumstances may be taken into account for the achievement of an honorary decoration. Exceptional candidates who are awarded the cross will come with the honorary palms device attached to both the ribbon bar and the medals ribbon.
