= Andrew McKenzie (physician) =

American physician

Andrew B. McKenzie
- McKenzie and wife Marie at their home in Tuscaloosa
- Born: January 4, 1887
- Died: December 17, 1951 (aged 64); Tuscaloosa, Alabama, USA
- Known for: Chartering the Beta Pi Sigma chapter of Phi Beta Sigma fraternity in Tuscaloosa, AL on June 4, 1949
- Scientific career
- Fields: Internal medicine

Andrew B. McKenzie (January 4, 1887 – December 17, 1951) was an American physician. He was the first African American to practice medicine in Tuscaloosa, Alabama.

Born in Tallassee, Alabama, Andrew was the oldest of five children. He studied at the Tuskegee Institute, St. Augustine's College in Raleigh, and earned his medical degree in 1912 at the Leonard Medical School of Shaw University in Raleigh.

In honor of his memory, the McKenzie Courts in West End, Tuscaloosa, was named after him. He is buried next to Stillman College at West Highland Cemetery.
