= Fuente Obejuna =

- Municipality

- Seal

- Location in Spain
- Coordinates: 38°16′N 5°25′W
- Country: Spain
- Province: Córdoba
- Municipality: Fuente Obejuna

Area
  - Total: 592 km^{2} (229 sq mi)
- Elevation: 625 m (2,051 ft)

Population (2025-01-01)
  - Total: 4,309
  - Density: 7.28/km^{2} (18.9/sq mi)
- Time zone: UTC+1 (CET)
  - Summer (DST): UTC+2 (CEST)

Fuente Obejuna is a Spanish town in the province of Córdoba, autonomous community of Andalusia. The municipality has a population of around 5,000 inhabitants. Fuente Obejuna is located 98 km from the provincial capital, Córdoba. It was made famous by Lope de Vega's play Fuenteovejuna about the uprising that took place there in 1476.

== Etymology ==
Although Fuente Obejuna is the official name, the town is also known as Fuente Ovejuna and Fuenteovejuna. Before the creation of the Real Academia Española, the use of "b" and "v" was different from what it is today, and because of that fact Fuente Obejuna can be written in several ways, all of them correct. Some people have related the name of this town to the Roman villa Fons Mellaria ("honey fountain", whence the Spanish demonym mellarienses) that was situated in the municipality of Fuente Obejuna, 5 km from the urban area, at Masatrigos hill, a place where Roman remains have been found. From this name Fuente Abejuna ("bee fountain") was derived and then Fuente Obejuna.

== Demography ==
There are 14 pedanías that belong to Fuente Obejuna's municipality:

- Alcornocal
- Argallón
- Cañada del Gamo
- La Cardenchosa
- Coronada
- Cuenca
- Los Morenos
- Navalcuervo
- Ojuelos Altos
- Ojuelos Bajos
- Los Pánchez
- Piconcillo
- El Porvenir
- Posadilla

Number of residents in 1996-2006:

Demographic trends
1996	1997	1998	1999	2000	2001	2002	2003	2004	2005
6.711	6.695	6.032	5.890	5.817	5.743	5.615	5.530	5.434	5.409

== See also ==
- List of municipalities in Córdoba
- Fuenteovejuna
- Sierra Boyera Reservoir
