= Andrew Carr MacKenzie =

New Zealand journalist (1911–2001)

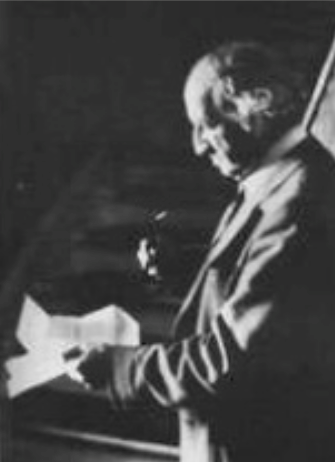
Andrew MacKenzie

Andrew Carr MacKenzie (1911–2001) was a journalist, novelist and parapsychologist from New Zealand.

He started a journalistic career and worked between 1928 and 1938 for The Evening Post of Wellington. He later moved from New Zealand to England where he became a columnist for Kemsley Newspapers.

MacKenzie was a writer of detective stories. He was vice president of the Society for Psychical Research and has been described as a leading researcher in the field of psychical research in the 1970s. He died at his home in Hove, East Sussex in 2001.

== Publications ==
Fiction

Police Superintendent series Branigan

- The House at the Estuary (1948)
- Search in the Dark (1948)
- Splash of Red (1949)
- Whisper If You Dare! (1950)
- The Man Who Wanted to Die (1951)
- Point of a Gun (1951)

Nicholas Cornish detective series

- Always Fight Back (1955)
- Three Hours to Hang (1955)
- A Grave Is Waiting (1957)
- The Reaching Hand (1957)
- Shadow of a Spy (1958)
- A Man From the Past (1958)
- The Missile (1959)

Non-fiction

- The Unexplained: Some Strange Cases In Psychical Research (1966)
- Frontiers of The Unknown: The Insights of Psychical Research (1968)
- Apparitions and Ghosts: A Modern Study (1971)
- A Gallery of Ghosts: An Anthology of Reported Experience (1973)
- The Riddle of The Future: A Study of Modern Precognition (1974)
- Dracula Country: Travels and Folk Beliefs in Romania (1977)
- Voting in Local Elections In New Zealand (1978)
- Hauntings and Apparitions: An Investigation of The Evidence (1982)
- Romanian Journey (1983)
- The History of Transylvania (1983)
- A Concise History of Romania (1985)
- Archaeology in Romania (1986)
- The Seen and the Unseen (1987)
- Music in Black Age (1992)
- Adventures in Time: Encounters with The Past (1997)
