= Alpujarra Almeriense =

- Comarca
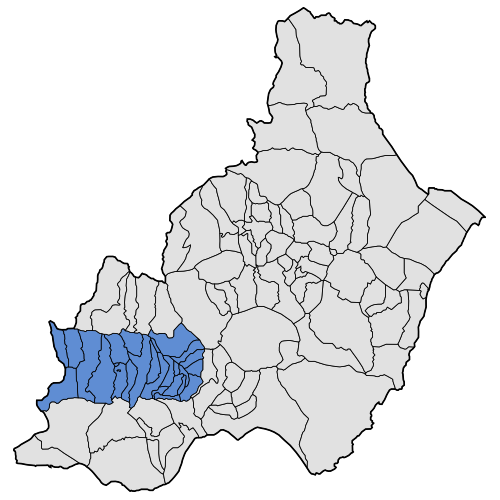
- Map showing municipal borders within the Province of Almería

- Alpujarra Almeriense within Andalusia
- Coordinates: 36°57′0″N 2°34′0″W
- Country: Spain
- Community: Andalusia
- Province: Almería
- Seat: Alhama de Almería
- Subdivision: 22 municipalities

Area
  - Total: 812.53 km^{2} (313.72 sq mi)

Population (2024) (Note: Census at 1 January 2024: National Statistics Institute (Spain))
  - Total: 14,981
  - Density: 18.437/km^{2} (47.753/sq mi)
- Demonym: Alpujarreños
- Time zone: UTC+1 (CET)
  - Summer (DST): UTC+2 (CEST)
- Largest municipality: Alhama de Almería

Alpujarra Almeriense is one of the seven comarcas in the province of Almería, Andalusia, Spain. This comarca was established in 2003 by the Government of Andalusia. Along with Alpujarra Granadina, is part of the Andalusian region of the Alpujarras.

== Overview ==
Located in the east of Alpujarra, it borders with the comarcas of Filabres-Tabernas, Almería (metropolitan comarca), Poniente Almeriense, and with the Granadian ones of Accitania (Guadix) and Alpujarra Granadina.

== Subdivision ==
The comarca is divided into 22 municipalities (municipios):

Arms	Municipality	Area (km^{2})	Population (2024) (Note: Census at 1 January 2024: National Statistics Institute (Spain))	Density (/km^{2})
	Alboloduy	69.68	585	8.40
	Alcolea	67.46	829	12.29
	Alhabia	16.00	725	45.31
	Alhama de Almería	26.22	3,878	147.90
	Alicún	5.87	215	36.63
	Almócita	30.00	210	7.00
	Alsodux	20.09	138	6.87
	Bayárcal	37.00	296	8.00
	Beires	38.80	148	3.81
	Bentarique	11.33	227	20.04
	Canjáyar	66.87	1,134	16.96
	Fondón	91.09	1,133	12.44
	Huécija	19.02	537	28.23
	Íllar	19.17	460	24.00
	Instinción	33.46	498	14.88
	Laujar de Andarax	92.74	1,658	17.88
	Ohanes	32.39	547	16.89
	Padules	27.00	440	16.30
	Paterna del Río	45.44	396	8.71
	Rágol	26.90	298	11.08
	Santa Cruz de Marchena	20.00	245	12.25
	Terque	16.00	384	24.00
	Total	812.53	14,981	18.44

== See also ==
- Alpujarra Granadina
- Morisco Revolt
