= Ribera del Andarax =

Spanish geographical indication for wine

Ribera del Andarax VdlT
- Wine region
- Ribera del Andarax VdlT in the province of Almería in the region of Andalusia
- Type: Vino de la Tierra
- Country: Spain

Ribera del Andarax is a Spanish geographical indication for Vino de la Tierra wines located in the autonomous region of Andalusia. Vino de la Tierra is one step below the mainstream Denominación de Origen indication on the Spanish wine quality ladder.

The area covered by this geographical indication comprises the following municipalities: Alboloduy, Alhabia, Alhama de Almería, Alicún, Almócita, Alsodux, Beires, Bentarique, Canjáyar, Enix, Félix, Gérgal, Huécija, Íllar, Instinción, Nacimiento, Ohanes, Padules, Rágol, Santa Cruz de Marchena y Terque, in the province of Almería (Andalusia, Spain).

It acquired its Vino de la Tierra status in 2003.

== Grape varieties ==
- Red: Cabernet Sauvignon, Merlot, Syrah, Garnacha, Tempranillo, Monastrell and Pinot noir
- White: Macabeo, Chardonnay and Sauvignon blanc
