= Desierto de Almería =

Desierto de Almería VdlT
- Wine region
- Desierto de Almería VdlT in the province of Almería in the region of Andalusia
- Type: Vino de la Tierra
- Country: Spain

The Desierto de Almería Vino de la Tierra region, in Andalusia.

Desierto de Almería is a Spanish geographical indication for Vino de la Tierra wines located in the autonomous region of Andalusia. Vino de la Tierra is one step below the mainstream Denominación de Origen indication on the Spanish wine quality ladder.

The area covered by this geographical indication comprises the following municipalities: Alcudia de Monteagud, Benitagla, Benizalón, Castro de Filabres, Lubrín, Lucainena de las Torres, Olula de Castro, Senés, Sorbas, Tabernas, Tahal, Turrillas, Uleila del Campo and Velefique, in the province of Almería (Andalusia, Spain).

It acquired its Vino de la Tierra status in 2003.

== Grape varieties ==
- Red: Garnacha tinta, Monastrell, Syrah, Cabernet Sauvignon and Merlot
- White: Chardonnay, Moscatel, Macabeo and Sauvignon blanc
