= Nacimiento =

Nacimiento may refer to:

== Settlements ==
- Nacimiento, Chile, a municipality in the province of Bío Bío, region of Bío Bío, Chile
- Nacimiento, Spain, a municipality in the province of Almería, Andalusia, Spain
- Nacimiento, California, United States
- Lake Nacimiento, California, United States
- El Nacimiento, in the Mexican state of Coahuila, a Kickapoo settlement

== Other geographic features ==
- Nacimiento Mountains, a mountain range in the northwestern part of the US state of New Mexico
- Cerro del Nacimiento, a mountain peak in the Andes in Argentina
- Nacimiento Formation, a Paleocene-age rock unit in the San Juan Basin of New Mexico
- Nacimiento River, in California
- Lake Nacimiento, in California

== Other uses ==
- Nacimiento 28 diciembre, a traditional nativity scene in many Spanish-speaking countries
