= Pepe Vidaña =

Spanish footballer (1956–2020)

Personal information
- Full name: José Sánchez Vidaña
- Date of birth: 3 December 1956 (age 69)
- Place of birth: Padules, Spain
- Date of death: 2 July 2020 (aged 63)
- Place of death: Murcia, Spain
- Height: 1.83 m (6 ft 0 in)
- Position: Defender

Senior career*
Years	Team	Apps	(Gls)
1975–1988	Murcia	350	(7)
1977–1978	→ Girona (loan)	34	(1)

Managerial career
- 1994–1995: Murcia
- 2008–2009: Murcia Deportivo
- 2011–2012: La Unión
- * Club domestic league appearances and goals

José "Pepe" Sánchez Vidaña (3 December 1956 – 2 July 2020) was a Spanish manager and professional footballer who played as a central defender.

Vidaña spend 15 seasons on Real Murcia, for the club he played on La Liga and won 3 Segunda División titles. He owns the appearances record in the Murcia club with 350 played matches, and was the captain for ten years. A serious knee injury forced his retirement as a player at the end of 1977–78 season.

In July 1994, Vidaña was named new manager of Real murcia. His last club as a manager was Segunda División B club La Unión Atlético on 2011.

Vidaña died of cancer at 63 years old. On his honor, the club named the Gate 9 of Estadio Nueva Condomina with his name.

== Honours ==
=== Club ===
Real Murcia

- Segunda División: 1979–80, 1982–83, 1985–86.
