= Senés =

Senés, Spain
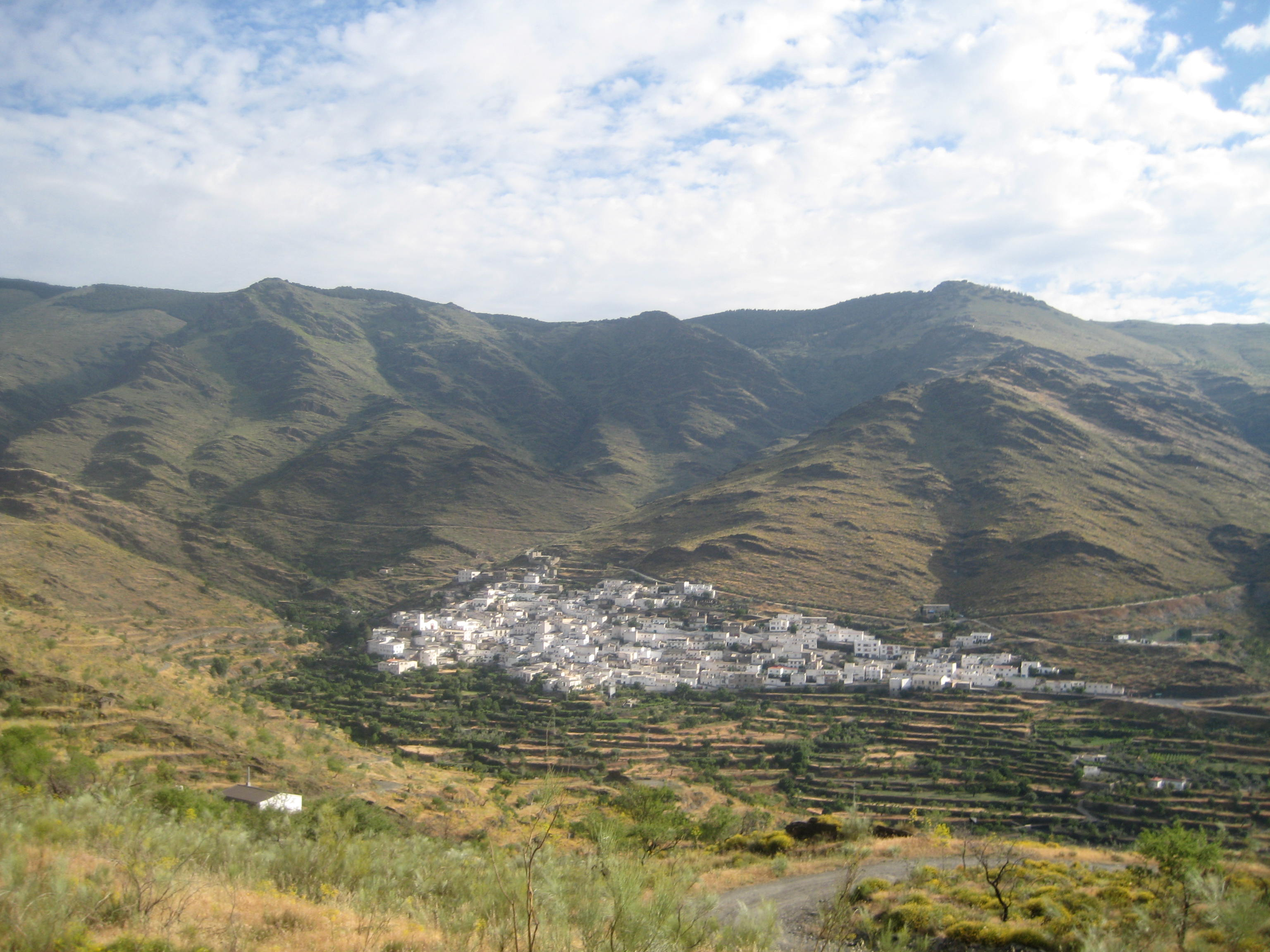
- View of Senés

- Coat of arms
- Interactive map of Senés, Spain
- Coordinates: 37°12′N 2°20′W
- Country: Spain
- Community: Andalusia
- Municipality: Almería

Government
  - Mayor: Francisco Javier Sola Golbano

Area
  - Total: 50 km^{2} (19 sq mi)
- Elevation: 995 m (3,264 ft)

Population (2025-01-01)
  - Total: 279
  - Density: 5.6/km^{2} (14/sq mi)
- Time zone: UTC+1 (CET)
  - Summer (DST): UTC+2 (CEST)

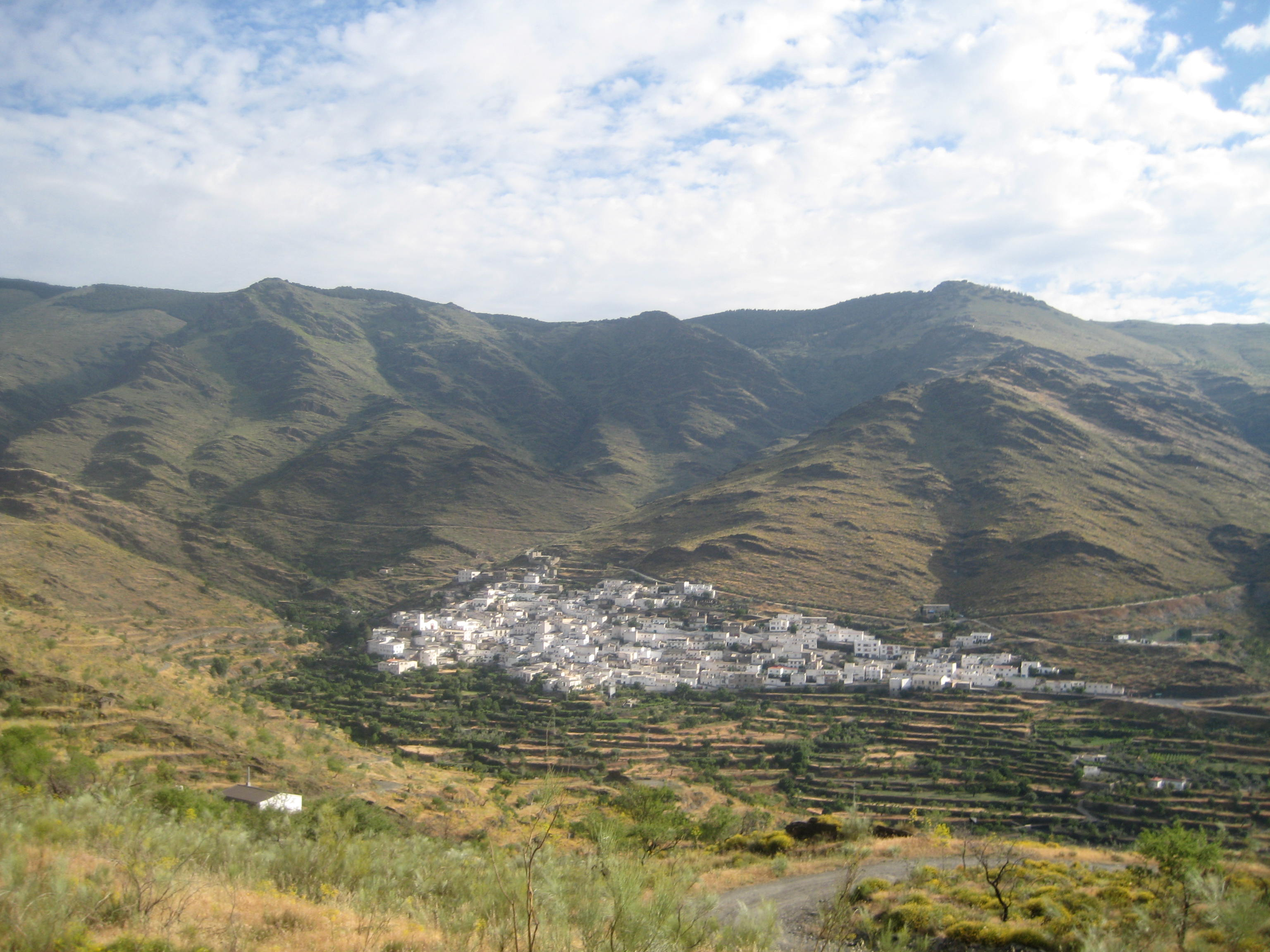
View of Senés and surrounding

Senés (Spanish: [seˈnes]) is a municipality of Almería province, in the autonomous community of Andalusia, Spain.

== Demographics ==
Historical population
Year	Pop.	±%
1999	335	—
2000	325	−3.0%
2001	323	−0.6%
2002	314	−2.8%
2003	309	−1.6%
2004	314	+1.6%
2005	319	+1.6%
Source: INE (Spain)

== History ==
Senés has Arab origins and features a distinctive urban style using slate slabs in construction. Evidence of prehistoric habitation includes megalithic burial sites in nearby locations such as Cortijada de Avellaneda and La Hoya de la Matanza, a Bronze Age settlement. The town developed through Roman Hispania and into the medieval Andalusian period, where terraces and hydraulic works were used to adapt agriculture to the rugged landscape. The 12th-century castle El Castillico de Senés was built during this time under Abu Ishaq ibn al-Hayy de Velefique. After the Moorish Rebellion (1482–1491), Senés was granted to Juan Téllez Girón, II Count of Ureña, and later transferred to Enrique Enríquez de Quiñones, linking it to the jurisdiction of Baza.

== Attractions ==
- Iglesia Parroquial: A Mudejar-style church located in Plaza del General Franco, rebuilt in the 16th century after the expulsion of the Moors. It contains valuable religious artworks and artifacts.
- Centro de Interpretación de la Historia a la Leyenda: An interpretation centre on Calle Granero that showcases the town’s fortifications and the origins of the local Moros y Cristianos Festival.

=== Countryside Walks ===
The GR-244 trail passes through Senés, connecting it to nine other municipalities over 109 km. The route offers diverse landscapes, including views of the Sierra de los Filabres, Tabernas Desert, and Sierra de Alhamilla natural area.

=== Gastronomy ===
Local specialties include migas (fried bread with pork), sopa de ajo (garlic soup), olla de trigo (wheat stew), cocido en morcilla (black pudding stew), choto al ajillo (garlic goat), and gazpacho dulce (sweet gazpacho with honey). Traditional sweets include roscos (aniseed doughnuts), bollos de nata (cream buns), and empanadillas (sweet pumpkin pastries).

== Festivals ==
Senés celebrates several festivals, including Semana Santa, Fiestas en Honor a El Divino Rostro, and the Fiesta del Emigrante.

== Tourist Office ==
The tourist office is located in the town hall.

== Nearby Places ==
Neighboring villages include Velefique, Tahal, and Tabernas.

== See also ==
- List of municipalities in Almería
