= Chirivel =

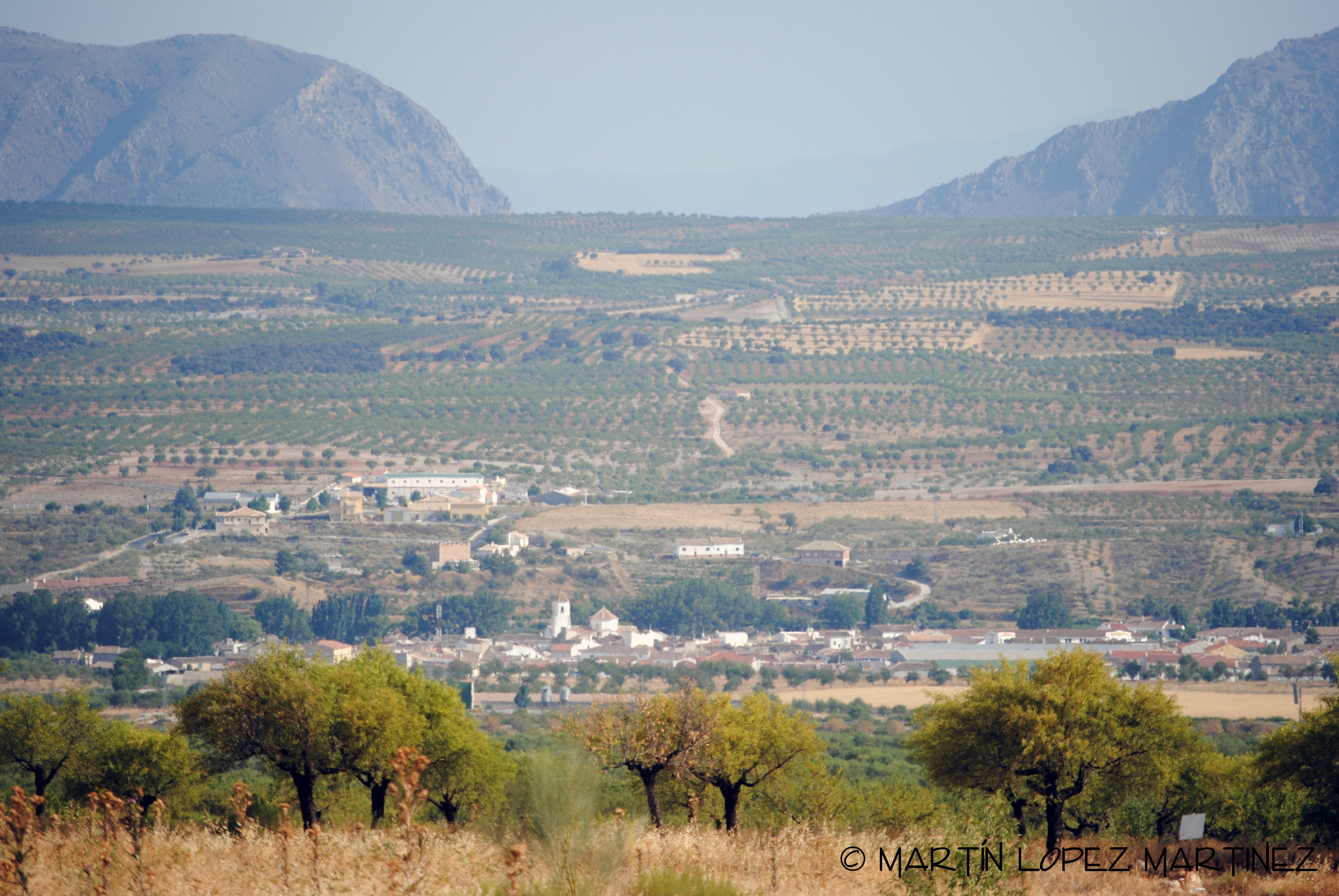
- View of Chirivel

- Location of Chirivel within the Province of Almería Location of Chirivel within Andalusia Location of Chirivel within Spain
- Coordinates: 37°35′N 2°16′W
- Country: Spain
- Community: Andalusia
- Province: Almería
- Comarca: Los Vélez

Government
  - Mayor: Emma Sola García (PSOE)

Area
  - Total: 197 km^{2} (76 sq mi)
- Elevation: 1,034 m (3,392 ft)

Population (2025-01-01)
  - Total: 1,619
  - Density: 8.22/km^{2} (21.3/sq mi)
- (INE)
- Time zone: UTC+1 (CET)
  - Summer (DST): UTC+2 (CEST)
- Website: chirivel.es

Chirivel is a municipality of Almería province, in the autonomous community of Andalusia, Spain.

== See also ==
- List of municipalities in Almería
