= Líjar =

Líjar, Spain
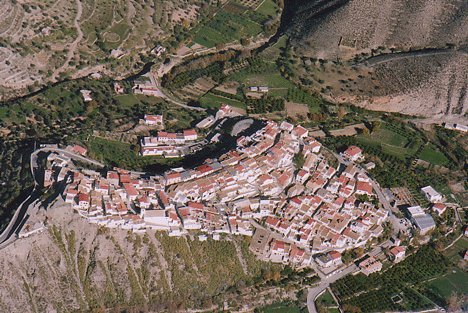
- Air view of Líjar

- Flag Coat of arms
- Interactive map of Líjar, Spain
- Coordinates: 37°17′N 2°13′W
- Country: Spain
- Community: Andalusia
- Municipality: Almería

Government
  - Mayor: Crescencio Molina Sánchez (PP)

Area
  - Total: 28 km^{2} (11 sq mi)
- Elevation: 612 m (2,008 ft)

Population (2025-01-01)
  - Total: 378
  - Density: 14/km^{2} (35/sq mi)
- Time zone: UTC+1 (CET)
  - Summer (DST): UTC+2 (CEST)

Líjar is a municipality of Almería province, in the autonomous community of Andalusia, Spain. On 14 October 1883 Lijar declared war on France because, "Our King Alfonso, when passing through Paris on the 29th day of September was stoned and offended in the most cowardly fashion by miserable hordes of the French nation." No actual fighting ever took place. In 1983, Lijar declared peace.

== Demographics ==
Historical population
Year	Pop.	±%
1999	496	—
2000	509	+2.6%
2001	519	+2.0%
2002	520	+0.2%
2003	514	−1.2%
2004	504	−1.9%
2005	500	−0.8%
Source: INE (Spain)

Source: INE (Spain)

== See also ==
- List of municipalities in Almería
