= Bacares =

- Municipality
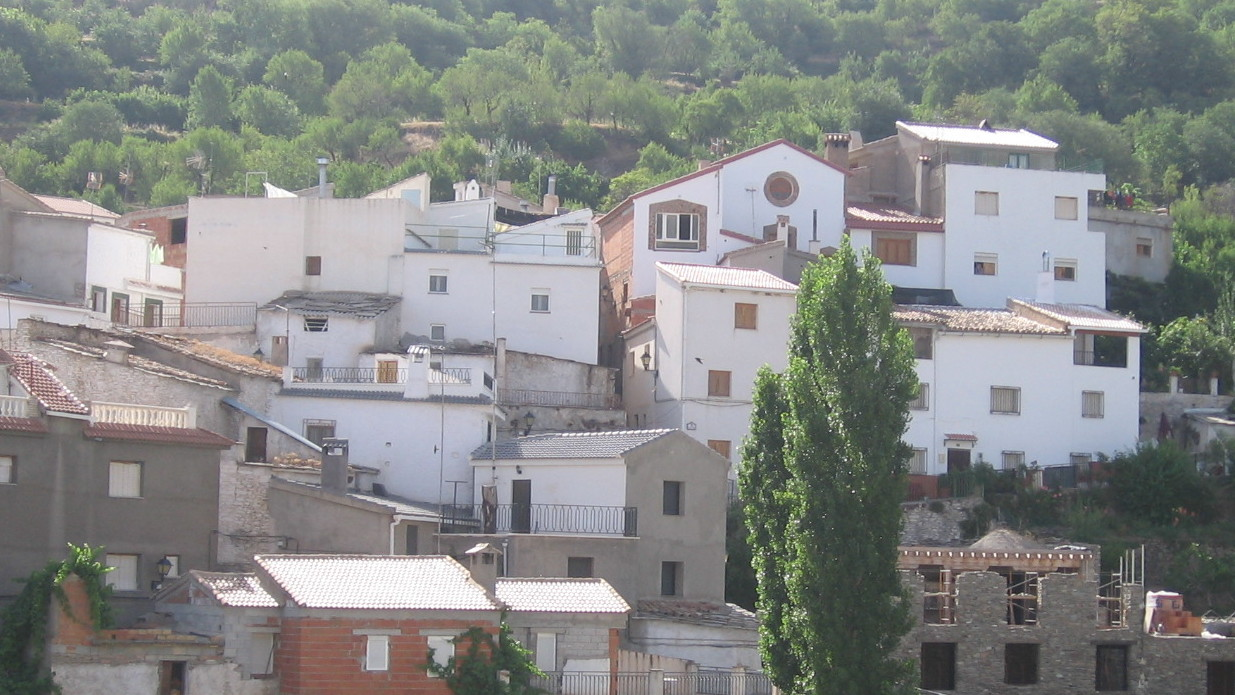
- Bacares

- Flag Seal

- Location within Spain
- Coordinates: 37°15′39.2″N 2°27′21.5″W
- Country: Spain
- A. community: Andalucía
- Province: Almería

Government
  - Mayor: Encarnación Zaguirre

Area
  - Total: 94.52 km^{2} (36.49 sq mi)

Population (January 1, 2021)
  - Total: 246
  - Density: 2.603/km^{2} (6.74/sq mi)
- Time zone: UTC+01:00
- Postal code: 04889
- MCN: 04019
- Website: Official website

Bacares is a municipality of Almería province, in the autonomous community of Andalusia, Spain.

== Demographics ==
Historical population
Year	Pop.	±%
1999	284	—
2000	291	+2.5%
2001	295	+1.4%
2002	295	+0.0%
2003	287	−2.7%
2004	296	+3.1%
2005	291	−1.7%
Source: INE (Spain)

== See also ==
- List of municipalities in Almería
