= Abrucena =

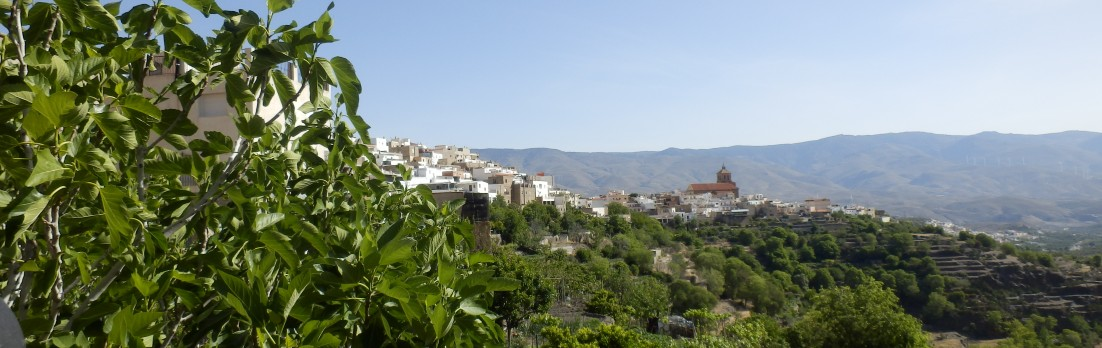

- Flag Coat of arms

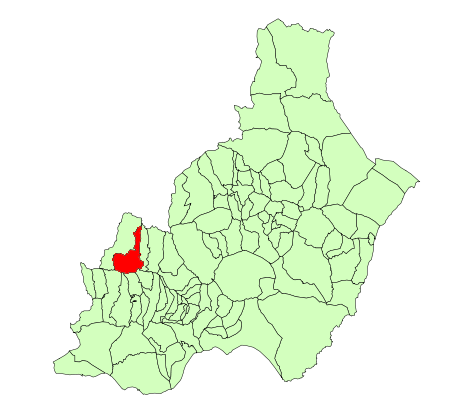

- Location within Spain
- Coordinates: 37°08′N 2°47′W
- Country: Spain
- Community: Andalusia
- Province: Almería

Government
  - Mayor: Juan Manuel Salmerón Escámez (PP)

Area
  - Total: 83 km^{2} (32 sq mi)
- Elevation: 978 m (3,209 ft)

Population (2025-01-01)
  - Total: 1,241
  - Density: 15/km^{2} (39/sq mi)
- Time zone: UTC+1 (CET)
  - Summer (DST): UTC+2 (CEST)

Abrucena is a municipality of Almería province, in Spain.

== Demographics ==
Historical population
Year	Pop.	±%
1999	1,460	—
2000	1,455	−0.3%
2001	1,437	−1.2%
2002	1,413	−1.7%
2003	1,391	−1.6%
2004	1,386	−0.4%
2005	1,358	−2.0%
2006	1,339	−1.4%
2007	1,379	+3.0%
2008	1,366	−0.9%
2009	1,341	−1.8%
2010	1,367	+1.9%
2011	1,391	+1.8%
2012	1,360	−2.2%
2013	1,299	−4.5%
2014	1,262	−2.8%
2015	1,279	+1.3%
2016	1,208	−5.6%
2017	1,170	−3.1%
2018	1,150	−1.7%
2019	1,202	+4.5%
Source: INE (Spain)

== See also ==
- List of municipalities in Almería
