= Laroya =

Laroya, Spain
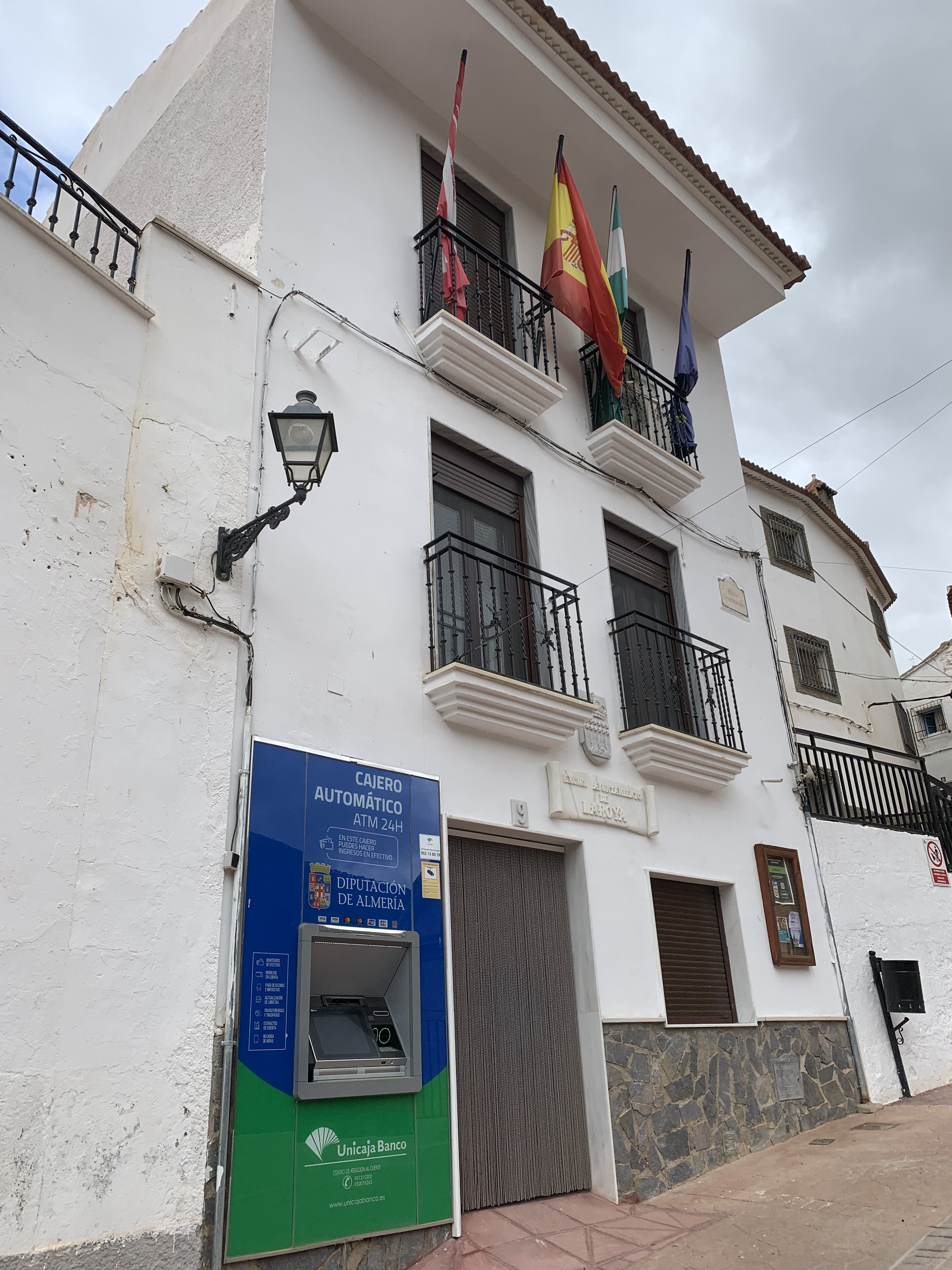
- Town hall

- Flag Coat of arms
- Interactive map of Laroya, Spain
- Coordinates: 37°18′N 2°20′W
- Country: Spain
- Community: Andalusia
- Municipality: Almería

Government
  - Mayor: José Antonio Ruiz Sánchez (PP)

Area
  - Total: 21 km^{2} (8.1 sq mi)
- Elevation: 860 m (2,820 ft)

Population (2025-01-01)
  - Total: 197
  - Density: 9.4/km^{2} (24/sq mi)
- Time zone: UTC+1 (CET)
  - Summer (DST): UTC+2 (CEST)

Laroya is a municipality of Almería province, in the autonomous community of Andalusia, Spain.

== Demographics ==
Historical population
Year	Pop.	±%
1999	105	—
2000	107	+1.9%
2001	98	−8.4%
2002	100	+2.0%
2003	102	+2.0%
2004	123	+20.6%
2005	127	+3.3%
2018	169	+33.1%
Source: INE (Spain)
