= Rioja, Almería =

Rioja, Spain
- Flag Coat of arms
- Interactive map of Rioja, Spain
- Coordinates: 36°56′N 2°27′W
- Country: Spain
- Community: Andalusia
- Municipality: Almería

Government
  - Mayor: María Isabel Sánchez Siles

Area
  - Total: 36 km^{2} (14 sq mi)
- Elevation: 122 m (400 ft)

Population (2025-01-01)
  - Total: 1,609
  - Density: 45/km^{2} (120/sq mi)
- Time zone: UTC+1 (CET)
  - Summer (DST): UTC+2 (CEST)
- Climate: BWk

Rioja is a municipality of Almería province, in the autonomous community of Andalusia, Spain. It should not be confused with La Rioja (autonomous community) in the north, known for its distinctive wine.

== Demographics ==
Historical population
Year	Pop.	±%
1999	1,186	—
2000	1,191	+0.4%
2001	1,199	+0.7%
2002	1,213	+1.2%
2003	1,213	+0.0%
2004	1,278	+5.4%
2005	1,329	+4.0%
Source: INE (Spain)

== See also ==
- List of municipalities in Almería
