= Turre =

Turre, Spain
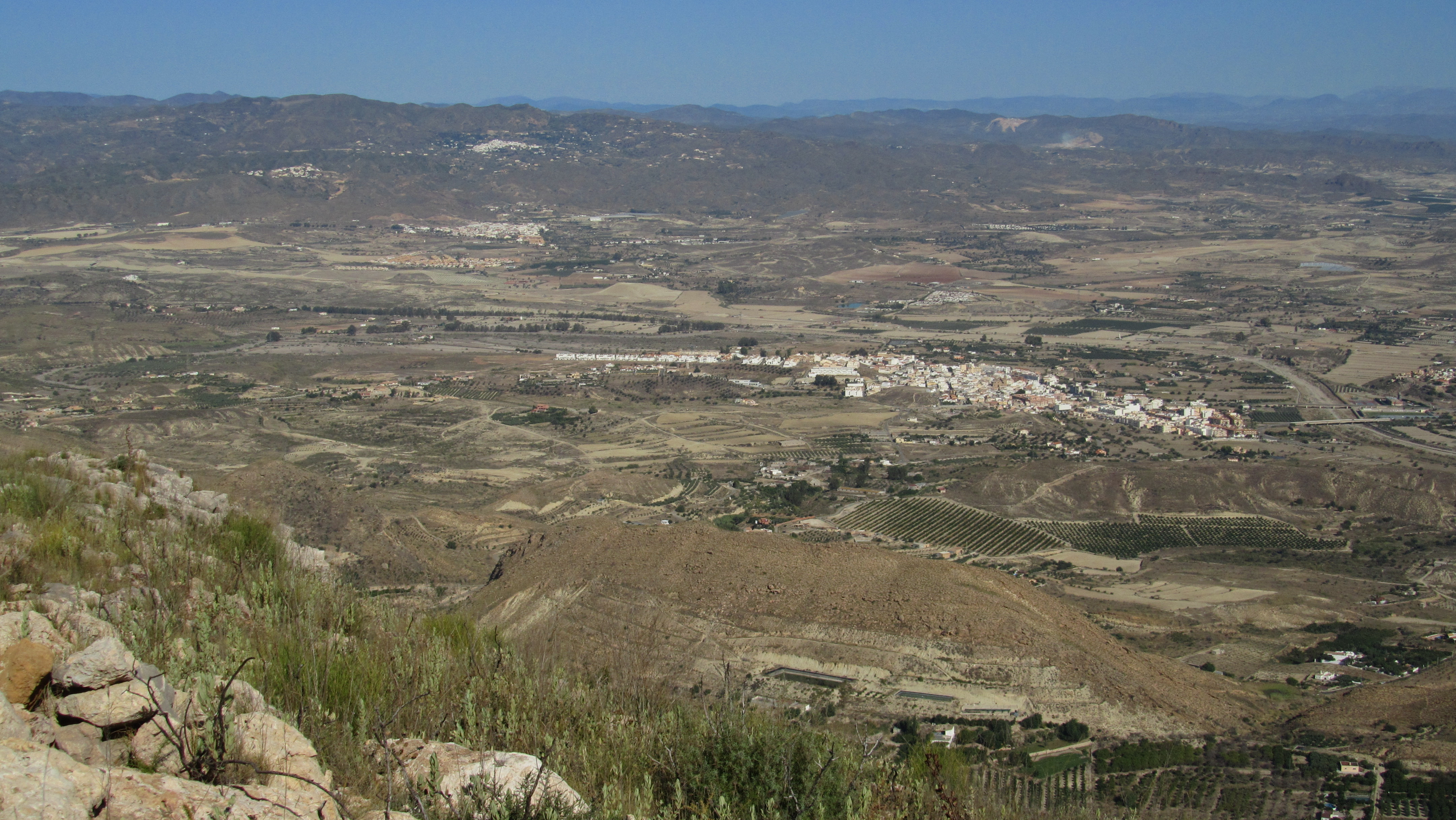

- Flag Coat of arms
- Interactive map of Turre, Spain
- Coordinates: 37°09′N 1°53′W
- Country: Spain
- Community: Andalusia
- Municipality: Almería

Government
  - Mayor: Martín Morales Fuentes (TPLG)

Area
  - Total: 108 km^{2} (42 sq mi)
- Elevation: 53 m (174 ft)

Population (2025-01-01)
  - Total: 4,361
  - Density: 40.4/km^{2} (105/sq mi)
- Time zone: UTC+1 (CET)
  - Summer (DST): UTC+2 (CEST)
- Climate: BWh

Turre is a municipality of Almería province, in the autonomous community of Andalusia, Spain.

== Demographics ==
Historical population
Year	Pop.	±%
1999	2,233	—
2000	2,331	+4.4%
2001	2,365	+1.5%
2002	2,453	+3.7%
2003	2,547	+3.8%
2004	2,656	+4.3%
2005	2,884	+8.6%
2006	3,045	+5.6%
2007	3,264	+7.2%
2008	3,453	+5.8%
2009	3,626	+5.0%
2010	3,791	+4.6%
2011	3,901	+2.9%
2012	3,929	+0.7%
2013	3,960	+0.8%
2014	3,563	−10.0%
2015	3,346	−6.1%
2016	3,351	+0.1%
2017	3,317	−1.0%
2018	3,384	+2.0%
Source: INE (Spain)

== History of Turre ==
Turre was originally a Moorish settlement created after the invading Christian armies of the Catholic Monarchs expelled the Moors from the nearby village of Mojacar in 1488. It was originally called Turris, after the Latin for "tower", probably because there was a watchtower at the location of the new settlement.

== See also ==
- List of municipalities in Almería
