= Las Tres Villas =

Las Tres Villas, Spain
- Flag Coat of arms
- Interactive map of Las Tres Villas, Spain
- Coordinates: 37°08′N 2°42′W
- Country: Spain
- Community: Andalusia
- Municipality: Almería

Government
  - Mayor: Virtudes Pérez Castillo (PSOE)

Area
  - Total: 85 km^{2} (33 sq mi)
- Elevation: 688 m (2,257 ft)

Population (2025-01-01)
  - Total: 547
  - Density: 6.4/km^{2} (17/sq mi)
- Time zone: UTC+1 (CET)
  - Summer (DST): UTC+2 (CEST)

Las Tres Villas (Spanish: [las ˈtɾes ˈβiʎas]) is a municipality of Almería province, in the autonomous community of Andalusia, Spain.

== Demographics ==
Historical population
Year	Pop.	±%
1999	605	—
2000	607	+0.3%
2001	601	−1.0%
2002	588	−2.2%
2003	663	+12.8%
2004	632	−4.7%
2005	587	−7.1%
Source: INE (Spain)

== See also ==
- List of municipalities in Almería
