= Oria, Spain =

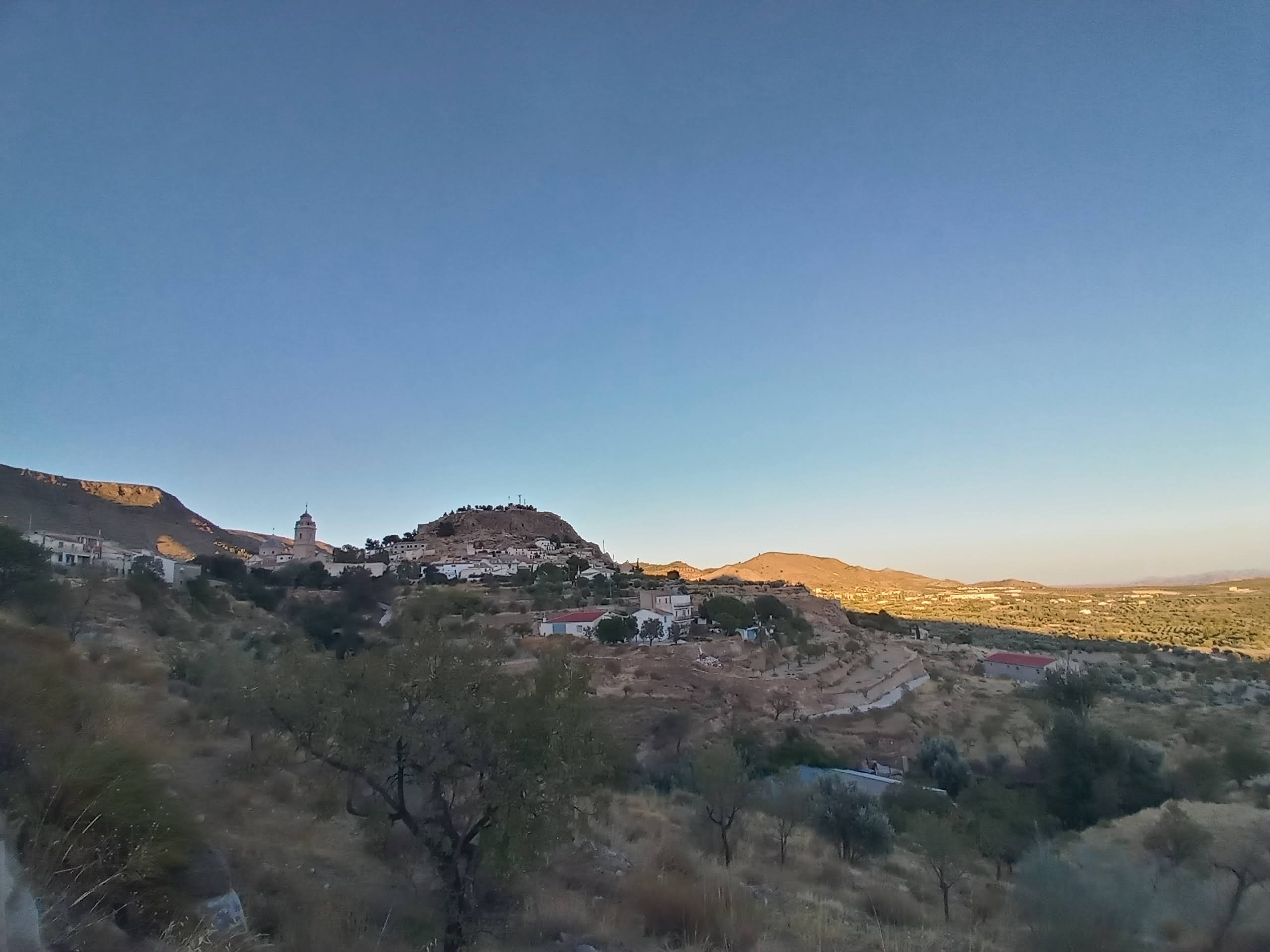

- Flag Coat of arms
- Interactive map of Oria, Spain
- Coordinates: 37°29′N 2°17′W
- Country: Spain
- Community: Andalusia
- Municipality: Almería

Government
  - Mayor: José Pérez Pérez (PSOE)

Area
  - Total: 235 km^{2} (91 sq mi)
- Elevation: 1,025 m (3,363 ft)

Population (2025-01-01)
  - Total: 2,219
  - Density: 9.44/km^{2} (24.5/sq mi)
- Time zone: UTC+1 (CET)
  - Summer (DST): UTC+2 (CEST)

Oria is a municipality of Almería province, in the autonomous community of Andalusia, Spain.

Oria has a basilica, built in 1767.

https://es.wikipedia.org/w/index.php?title=Bas%C3%ADlica_de_Nuestra_Se%C3%B1ora_de_las_Mercedes_(Oria)&oldid=163717822

== Demographics ==
Historical population
Year	Pop.	±%
1999	2,138	—
2000	2,129	−0.4%
2001	2,128	−0.0%
2002	2,161	+1.6%
2003	2,293	+6.1%
2004	2,350	+2.5%
2005	2,488	+5.9%
2006	2,619	+5.3%
2007	2,777	+6.0%
2008	2,920	+5.1%
2009	2,898	−0.8%
2010	2,888	−0.3%
2011	2,892	+0.1%
2012	2,858	−1.2%
2013	2,366	−17.2%
2014	2,495	+5.5%
2015	2,428	−2.7%
2016	2,330	−4.0%
2017	2,265	−2.8%
2018	2,238	−1.2%
Source: INE (Spain)

== See also ==
- List of municipalities in Almería
