= List of municipalities in Almería =

Map of Spain with the province of Almería highlighted

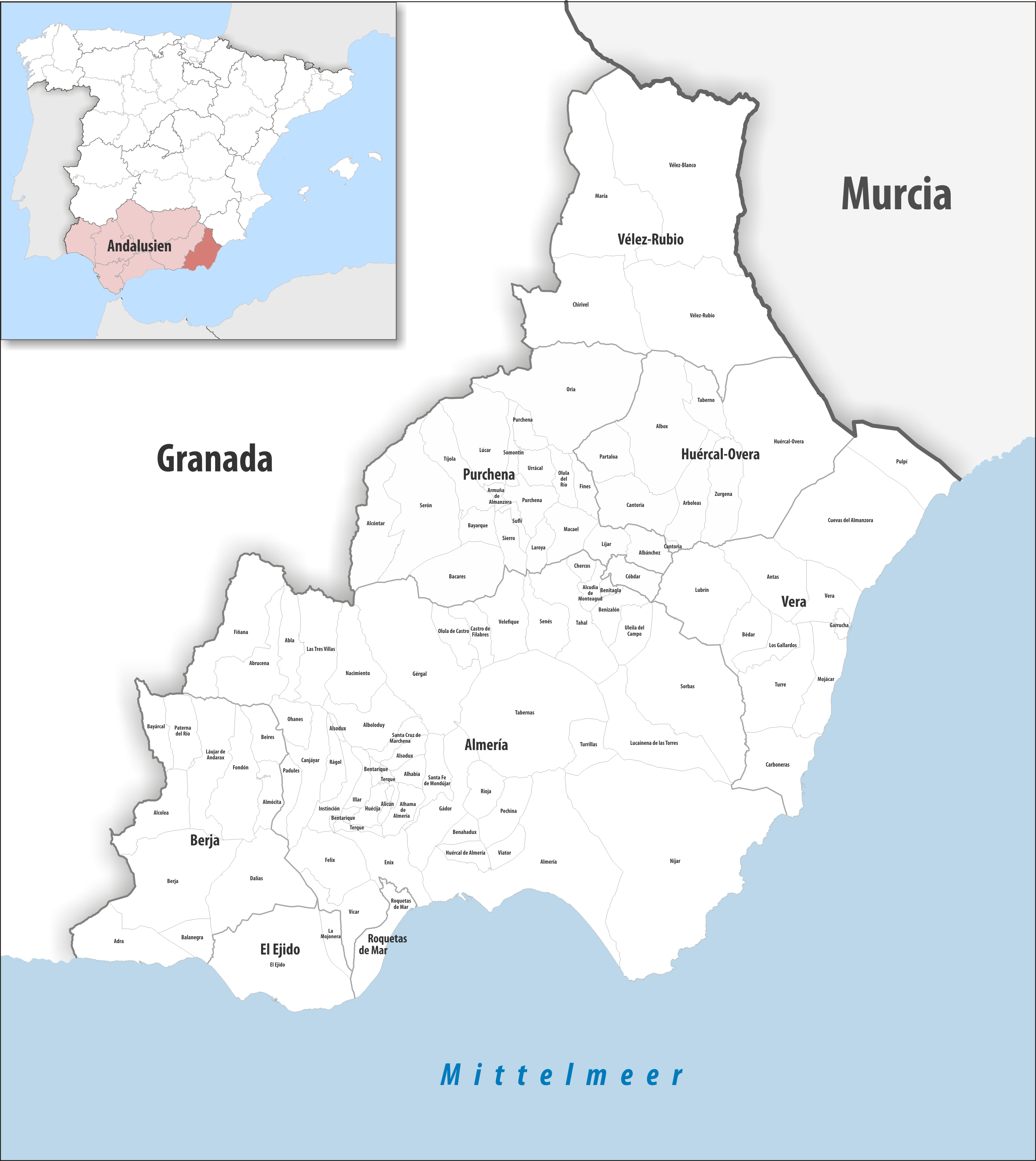
Map of the municipalities in the province of Almería

Almería is a province in the autonomous community of Andalusia, Spain. The province is divided into 103 municipalities. As of the 2024 Spanish census, Almería is the 21st most populous of Spain's 50 provinces, with 760,964 inhabitants, and the 27th largest by land area, spanning 8,773.05 square kilometres (3,387.29 sq mi). Municipalities are the most basic local political division in Spain and can only belong to one province. They enjoy a large degree of autonomy in their local administration, being in charge of tasks such as urban planning, water supply, lighting, roads, local police, and firefighting.

The organisation of municipalities in Spain is outlined by the local government law Ley 7/1985, de 2 de abril, Reguladora de las Bases del Régimen Local (transl. Law 7/1985, of 2 April, Regulating the Bases of the Local Administration), which was passed by the Cortes Generales—Spain's national parliament—on 2 April 1985 and finalised by royal decree on 18 April 1986. Municipalities in Almería are also governed by the Statute of Autonomy of Andalusia, which includes provisions concerning their relations with Andalusia's autonomous government. All citizens of Spain are required to register in the municipality in which they reside. Each municipality is a corporation (Note: Within the context of local government in Spain, a corporation is a legal entity representing a municipality. Each municipality is empowered to govern over a specific piece of land and its population.) with independent legal personhood: its governing body is called the ayuntamiento (municipal council or corporation), a term often also used to refer to the municipal offices (city and town halls). The ayuntamiento is composed of the mayor (Spanish: alcalde), the deputy mayors (tenientes de alcalde) and the councillors (concejales), who form the plenary (pleno), the deliberative body. Municipalities are categorised by population for determining the number of councillors: three when the population is up to 100 inhabitants, five for 101–250, seven for 251–1,000, nine for 1,001–2,000, eleven for 2,001–5,000, thirteen for 5,001–10,000, seventeen for 10,001–20,000, twenty-one for 20,001–50,000, and twenty-five for 50,001–100,000. One councillor is added for every additional 100,000 inhabitants, with a further one included if the total would otherwise be even, to avoid tied votes.

The mayor and the deputy mayors are elected by the plenary assembly, which is itself elected by universal suffrage. Elections in municipalities with more than 250 inhabitants are carried out following a proportional representation system with closed lists, whilst those with a population lower than 250 use a block plurality voting system with open lists. The plenary assembly must meet periodically, with meetings occurring more or less frequently depending on the population of the municipality: monthly for those whose population is larger than 20,000, once every two months if it ranges between 5,001 and 20,000, and once every three months if it does not exceed 5,000. Many ayuntamientos also have a local governing board (Spanish: junta de gobierno local), which is appointed by the mayor from amongst the councillors and is required for municipalities of over 5,000 inhabitants. The board, whose role is to assist the mayor between meetings of the plenary assembly, may not include more than one third of the councillors.

The largest municipality by population in the province as of the 2024 Spanish census is Almería, its capital, with 201,946 residents, while the smallest is Benitagla, with 59 residents. The largest municipality by area is Níjar, which spans 599.76 square kilometres (231.57 sq mi), while Alicún is the smallest at 5.87 square kilometres (2.27 sq mi).

== Municipalities ==
Largest municipalities in the province of Almería by population

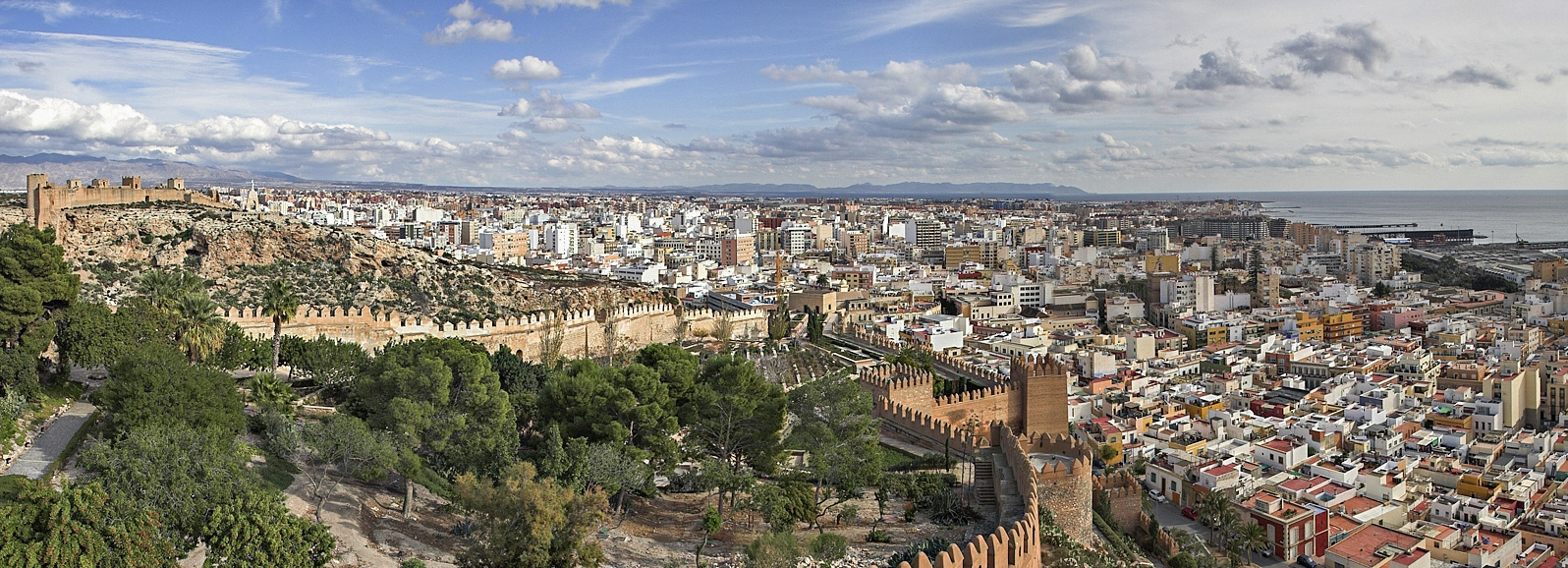
Almería is the province's capital and largest municipality by population.

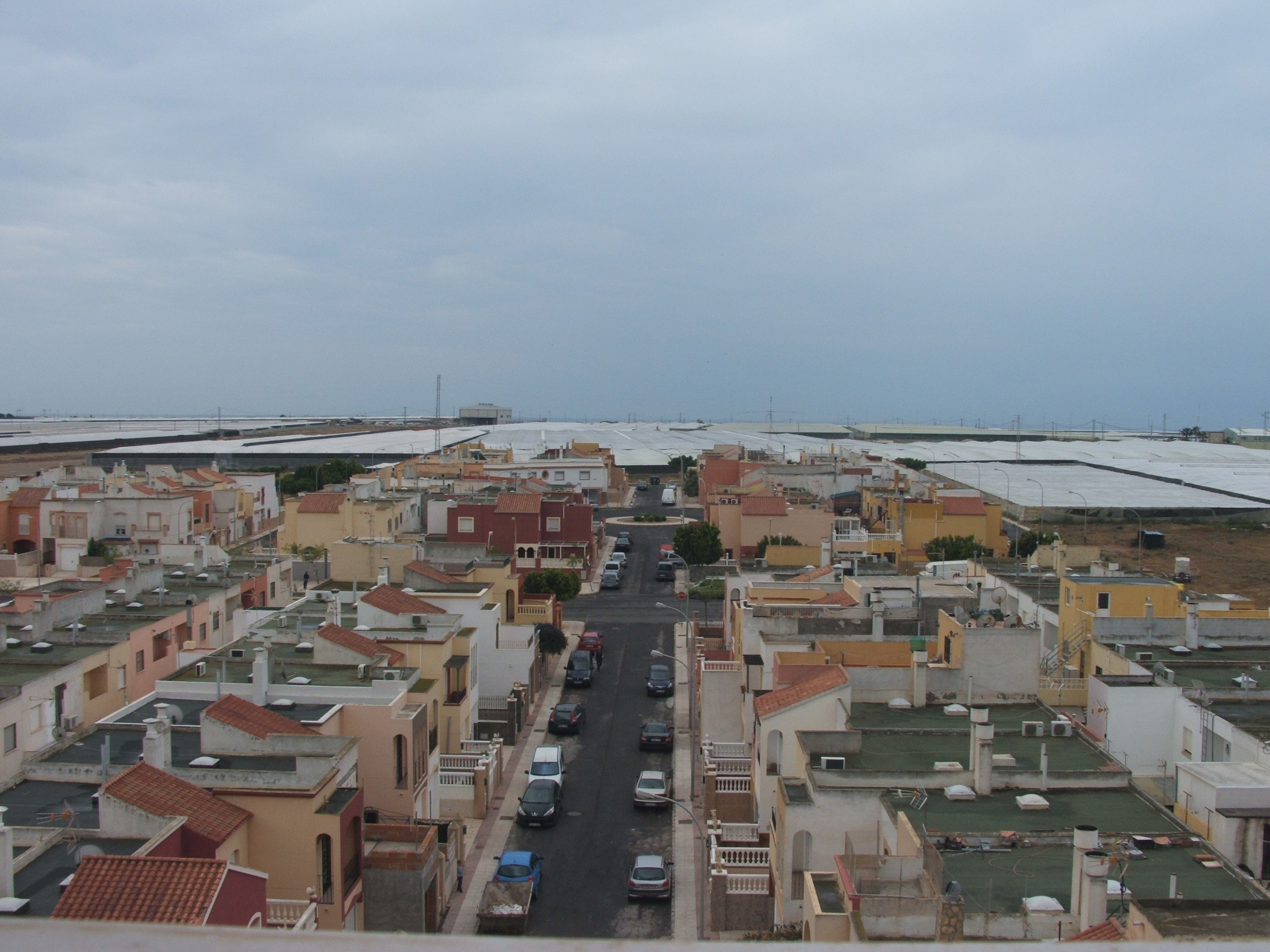
Roquetas de Mar, the second largest municipality by population in Almería

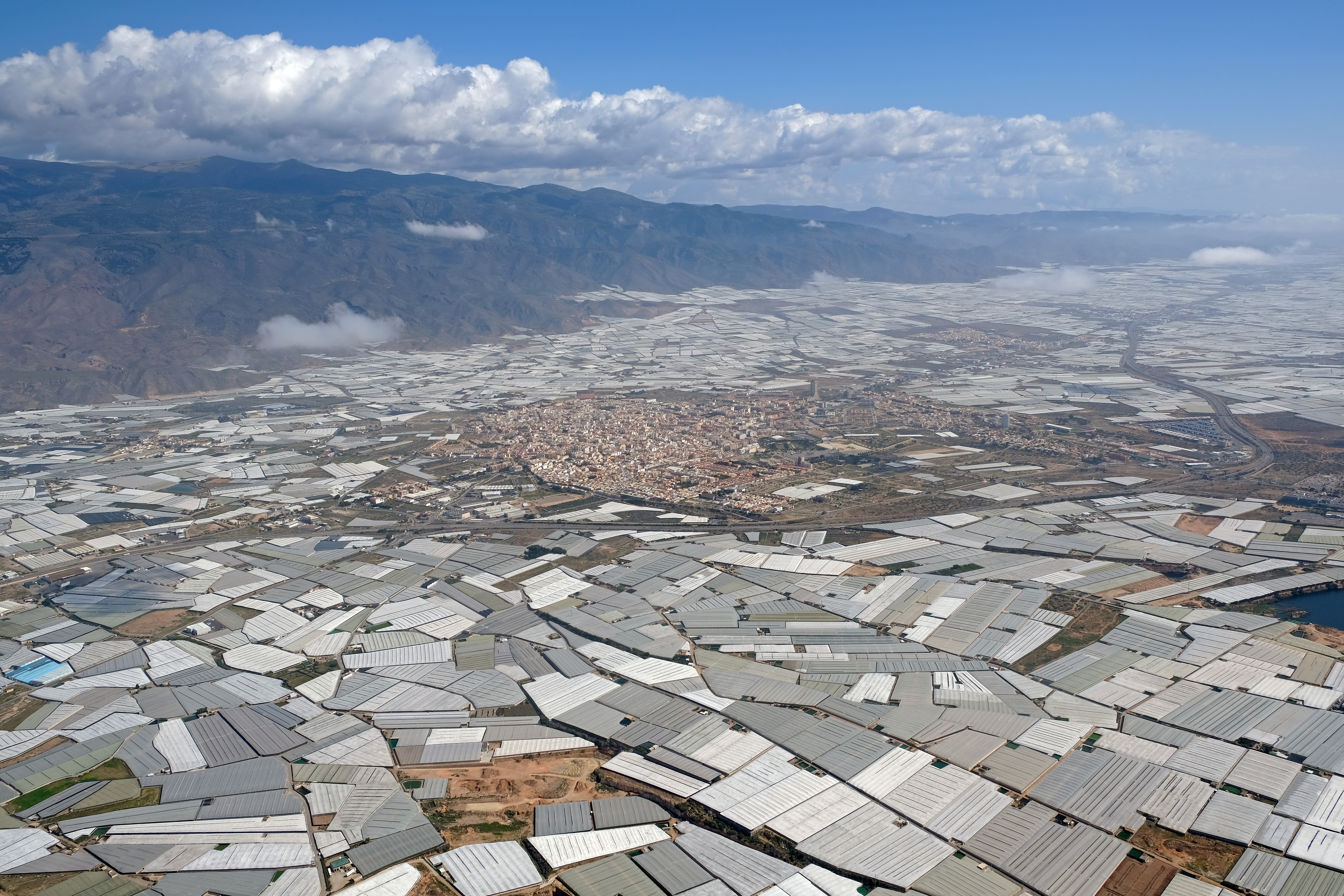
El Ejido is the province's third largest municipality by population.

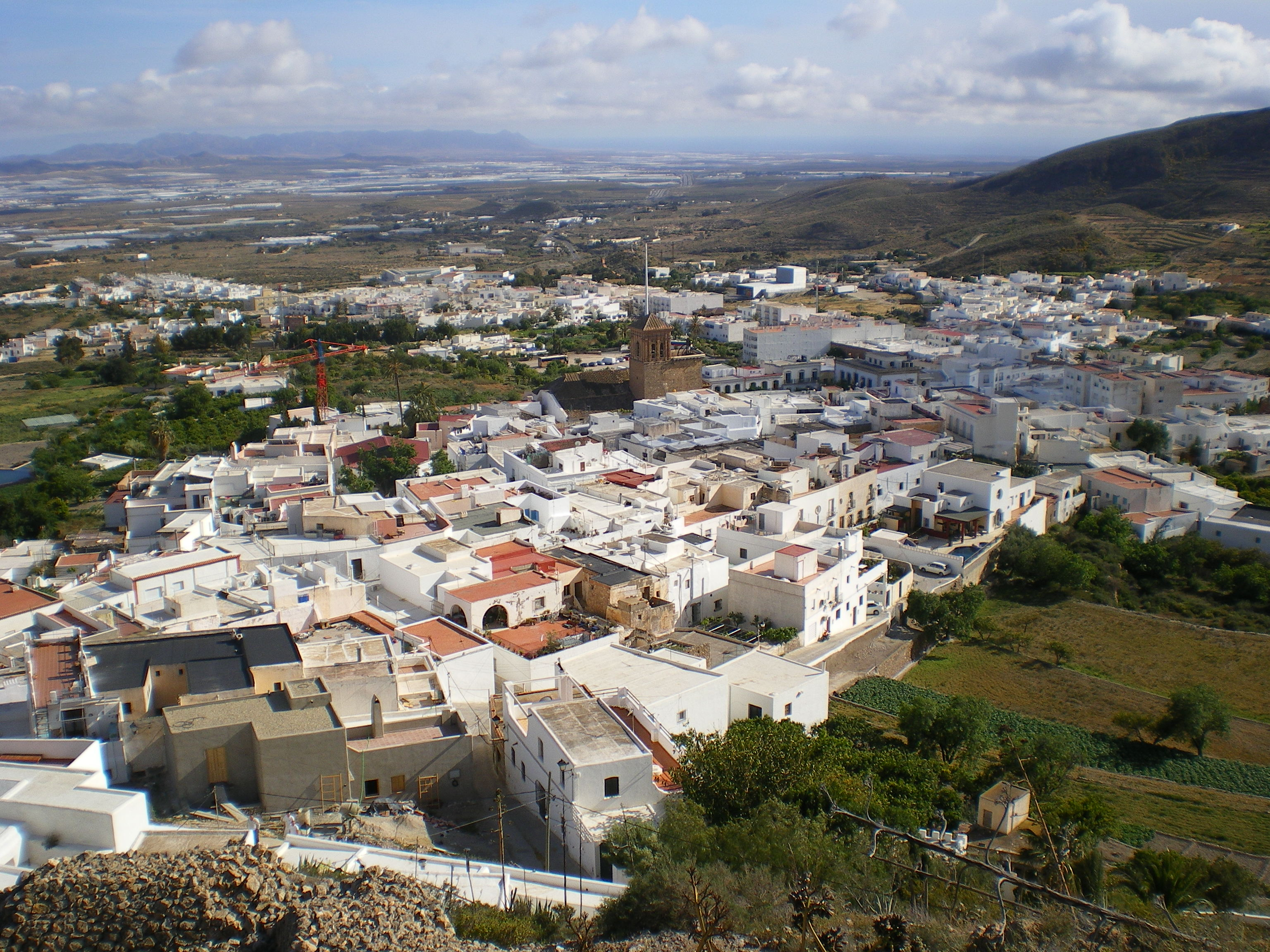
Níjar, Almería's fourth largest municipality by population

† Provincial capital

Municipalities in the province of Almería
Name	Population			Land area (km^{2})	Population density (2024)
Name	2024 census	2011 census	Change	Land area (km^{2})	Population density (2024)
Abla	1,277	1,459	−12.5%	45.24	28.2/km^{2}
Abrucena	1,234	1,352	−8.7%	83.67	14.7/km^{2}
Adra	25,432	24,375	+4.3%	89.69	283.6/km^{2}
Albanchez	681	745	−8.6%	34.91	19.5/km^{2}
Alboloduy	583	684	−14.8%	69.73	8.4/km^{2}
Albox	12,510	10,885	+14.9%	168.27	74.3/km^{2}
Alcolea	831	911	−8.8%	67.51	12.3/km^{2}
Alcóntar	556	624	−10.9%	93.90	5.9/km^{2}
Alcudia de Monteagud	129	158	−18.4%	15.52	8.3/km^{2}
Alhabia	732	686	+6.7%	16.39	44.7/km^{2}
Alhama de Almería	3,904	3,841	+1.6%	26.24	148.8/km^{2}
Alicún	214	268	−20.1%	5.87	36.5/km^{2}
Almería†	201,946	189,680	+6.5%	295.72	682.9/km^{2}
Almócita	213	190	+12.1%	30.82	6.9/km^{2}
Alsodux	137	151	−9.3%	20.10	6.8/km^{2}
Antas	3,439	3,261	+5.5%	99.73	34.5/km^{2}
Arboleas	4,296	4,534	−5.2%	66.14	65.0/km^{2}
Armuña de Almanzora	330	347	−4.9%	7.72	42.7/km^{2}
Bacares	239	286	−16.4%	94.52	2.5/km^{2}
Balanegra	3,027	No data (Note: Balanegra was partitioned from Berja and became an independent municipality in 2015 and is thus not included in the 2011 census.)		31.59	95.8/km^{2}
Bayárcal	300	377	−20.4%	38.02	7.9/km^{2}
Bayarque	223	224	−0.4%	26.36	8.5/km^{2}
Bédar	976	942	+3.6%	46.72	20.9/km^{2}
Beires	148	115	+28.7%	38.83	3.8/km^{2}
Benahadux	4,815	4,185	+15.1%	16.61	289.9/km^{2}
Benitagla	59	75	−21.3%	6.39	9.2/km^{2}
Benizalón	250	289	−13.5%	32.22	7.8/km^{2}
Bentarique	228	277	−17.7%	11.34	20.1/km^{2}
Berja	12,884	15,155	−15.0%	185.81	69.3/km^{2}
Canjáyar	1,130	1,439	−21.5%	66.92	16.9/km^{2}
Cantoria	3,568	3,849	−7.3%	78.95	45.2/km^{2}
Carboneras	8,456	7,881	+7.3%	95.46	88.6/km^{2}
Castro de Filabres	102	159	−35.8%	29.23	3.5/km^{2}
Chercos	310	301	+3.0%	13.55	22.9/km^{2}
Chirivel	1,579	1,780	−11.3%	196.47	8.0/km^{2}
Cóbdar	194	161	+20.5%	31.99	6.1/km^{2}
Cuevas del Almanzora	15,116	13,139	+15.0%	263.75	57.3/km^{2}
Dalías	4,158	4,007	+3.8%	140.72	29.5/km^{2}
El Ejido	89,462	80,839	+10.7%	226.13	395.6/km^{2}
Enix	603	426	+41.5%	66.84	9.0/km^{2}
Felix	770	663	+16.1%	81.26	9.5/km^{2}
Fines	2,275	2,227	+2.2%	23.12	98.4/km^{2}
Fiñana	2,018	2,364	−14.6%	133.95	15.1/km^{2}
Fondón	1,133	990	+14.4%	91.15	12.4/km^{2}
Gádor	3,074	3,190	−3.6%	87.67	35.1/km^{2}
Los Gallardos	3,078	3,401	−9.5%	34.89	88.2/km^{2}
Garrucha	10,525	8,529	+23.4%	7.76	1,356.3/km^{2}
Gérgal	1,196	1,072	+11.6%	229.48	5.2/km^{2}
Huécija	536	523	+2.5%	19.01	28.2/km^{2}
Huércal de Almería	18,698	16,298	+14.7%	20.92	893.8/km^{2}
Huércal-Overa	20,575	18,188	+13.1%	318.21	64.7/km^{2}
Íllar	467	423	+10.4%	19.18	24.3/km^{2}
Instinción	502	469	+7.0%	33.48	15.0/km^{2}
Laroya	211	167	+26.3%	21.71	9.7/km^{2}
Láujar de Andarax	1,655	1,736	−4.7%	92.80	17.8/km^{2}
Líjar	395	462	−14.5%	28.23	14.0/km^{2}
Lubrín	1,453	1,666	−12.8%	138.13	10.5/km^{2}
Lucainena de las Torres	728	648	+12.3%	123.20	5.9/km^{2}
Lúcar	828	883	−6.2%	100.71	8.2/km^{2}
Macael	5,478	5,951	−7.9%	43.82	125.0/km^{2}
María	1,198	1,385	−13.5%	225.56	5.3/km^{2}
Mojácar	7,455	7,085	+5.2%	71.53	104.2/km^{2}
La Mojonera	8,546	8,476	+0.8%	23.86	358.2/km^{2}
Nacimiento	504	513	−1.8%	80.75	6.2/km^{2}
Níjar	33,348	28,223	+18.2%	599.76	55.6/km^{2}
Ohanes	549	711	−22.8%	32.41	16.9/km^{2}
Olula de Castro	182	191	−4.7%	33.60	5.4/km^{2}
Olula del Río	6,429	6,486	−0.9%	23.44	274.3/km^{2}
Oria	2,233	2,587	−13.7%	234.71	9.5/km^{2}
Padules	439	519	−15.4%	26.49	16.6/km^{2}
Partaloa	889	867	+2.5%	52.60	16.9/km^{2}
Paterna del Río	396	433	−8.5%	45.48	8.7/km^{2}
Pechina	4,510	3,756	+20.1%	46.05	97.9/km^{2}
Pulpí	12,123	8,692	+39.5%	94.84	127.8/km^{2}
Purchena	1,535	1,731	−11.3%	56.60	27.1/km^{2}
Rágol	299	362	−17.4%	26.92	11.1/km^{2}
Rioja	1,612	1,353	+19.1%	36.40	44.3/km^{2}
Roquetas de Mar	108,348	86,799	+24.8%	59.64	1,816.7/km^{2}
Santa Cruz de Marchena	244	232	+5.2%	19.97	12.2/km^{2}
Santa Fe de Mondújar	505	466	+8.4%	34.86	14.5/km^{2}
Senés	281	309	−9.1%	50.24	5.6/km^{2}
Serón	2,150	2,325	−7.5%	166.28	12.9/km^{2}
Sierro	378	433	−12.7%	27.64	13.7/km^{2}
Somontín	526	522	+0.8%	16.12	32.6/km^{2}
Sorbas	2,504	2,696	−7.1%	249.15	10.1/km^{2}
Suflí	229	245	−6.5%	10.09	22.7/km^{2}
Tabernas	4,077	3,588	+13.6%	280.37	14.5/km^{2}
Taberno	962	1,123	−14.3%	44.05	21.8/km^{2}
Tahal	374	489	−23.5%	94.60	4.0/km^{2}
Terque	390	446	−12.6%	15.71	24.8/km^{2}
Tíjola	3,543	3,824	−7.3%	67.73	52.3/km^{2}
Las Tres Villas	575	662	−13.1%	85.35	6.7/km^{2}
Turre	4,341	3,718	+16.8%	107.95	40.2/km^{2}
Turrillas	263	227	+15.9%	39.16	6.7/km^{2}
Uleila del Campo	821	962	−14.7%	38.40	21.4/km^{2}
Urrácal	357	336	+6.3%	25.46	14.0/km^{2}
Velefique	246	296	−16.9%	66.44	3.7/km^{2}
Vélez-Blanco	1,952	2,171	−10.1%	441.31	4.4/km^{2}
Vélez-Rubio	6,577	6,932	−5.1%	282.54	23.3/km^{2}
Vera	19,416	14,650	+32.5%	57.59	337.1/km^{2}
Viator	6,334	5,459	+16.0%	20.62	307.2/km^{2}
Vícar	28,505	23,482	+21.4%	64.34	443.0/km^{2}
Zurgena	2,953	3,067	−3.7%	71.66	41.2/km^{2}
Province of Almería	760,964	688,736	+10.5%	8,773.05	86.7/km^{2}
Andalusia	8,631,862	8,371,270	+3.1%	87,587.59	98.6/km^{2}
Spain	48,619,695	46,815,916	+3.9%	504,755.17	96.3/km^{2}

== See also ==
- Geography of Spain
- List of municipalities of Spain
