= Fines, Spain =

- Flag Coat of arms
- Interactive map of Fines, Spain
- Coordinates: 37°21′N 2°15′W
- Country: Spain
- Community: Andalusia
- Municipality: Almería

Area
  - Total: 23 km^{2} (8.9 sq mi)
- Elevation: 456 m (1,496 ft)

Population (2025-01-01)
  - Total: 2,404
  - Density: 95.57/km^{2} (247.53/sq mi)
- Time zone: UTC+1 (CET)
  - Summer (DST): UTC+2 (CEST)

Fines (Spanish: [ˈfines]) is a municipality of Almería province, in the autonomous community of Andalusia, Spain.

== Demographics ==
Historical population

Year	Pop.	±%
1999	2,594	—
2000	2,537	−2.2%
2001	1,783	−29.7%
2002	1,818	+2.0%
2003	1,903	+4.7%
2004	1,930	+1.4%
2005	2,032	+5.3%
2006	2,106	+3.6%

Year	Pop.	±%
2007	2,190	+4.0%
2008	2,220	+1.4%
2009	2,378	+7.1%
2010	2,434	+2.4%
2011	2,371	−2.6%
2012	2,260	−4.7%
2013	2,244	−0.7%
2014	2,203	−1.8%

Source: INE (Spain)

== See also ==
- List of municipalities in Almería
