= Alcóntar =

- Municipality

- Flag Seal

- Location within Spain
- Coordinates: 37°20′08.9″N 2°35′59.1″W
- Country: Spain
- A. community: Andalucía
- Province: Almería

Government
  - Mayor: Antonio Ramón Salas

Area
  - Total: 93.91 km^{2} (36.26 sq mi)

Population (January 1, 2021)
  - Total: 550
  - Density: 5.857/km^{2} (15.17/sq mi)
- Time zone: UTC+01:00
- Postal code: 04897, 04898
- MCN: 04008
- Website: Official website

Alcóntar is a municipality of Almería province, in Spain.

== Demographics ==
Historical population
Year	Pop.	±%
1999	610	—
2000	656	+7.5%
2001	656	+0.0%
2002	647	−1.4%
2003	627	−3.1%
2004	650	+3.7%
2005	647	−0.5%
Source: INE (Spain)

== See also ==
- List of municipalities in Almería
