= Olula de Castro =

Olula de Castro, Spain
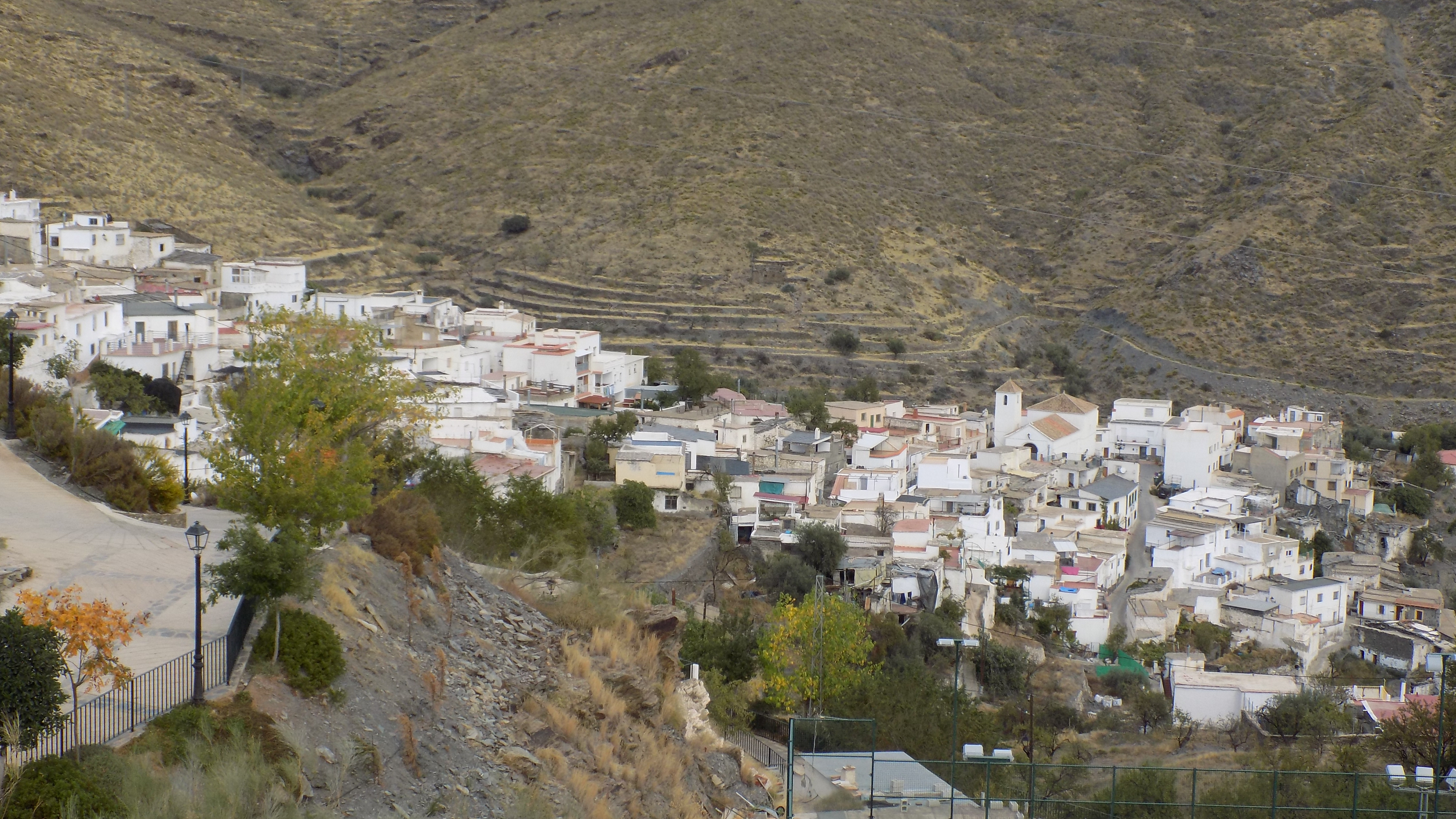

- Flag Coat of arms
- Interactive map of Olula de Castro, Spain
- Coordinates: 37°10′N 2°28′W
- Country: Spain
- Community: Andalusia
- Municipality: Almería

Government
  - Mayor: Christian Quero Gil (PSOE)

Area
  - Total: 33.58 km^{2} (12.97 sq mi)
- Elevation: 1,010 m (3,310 ft)

Population (2025-01-01)
  - Total: 175
  - Density: 5.21/km^{2} (13.5/sq mi)
- Time zone: UTC+1 (CET)
  - Summer (DST): UTC+2 (CEST)

Olula de Castro is a municipality of Almería province, in the autonomous community of Andalusia, Spain.

It is located in the Sierra de Los Filabres.

== Demographics ==
Historical population
Year	Pop.	±%
1999	189	—
2000	192	+1.6%
2001	189	−1.6%
2002	180	−4.8%
2003	165	−8.3%
2004	155	−6.1%
2005	150	−3.2%
Source: INE (Spain)

== See also ==
- List of municipalities in Almería
