= Bayárcal =

- Municipality
- Flag Seal

- Location within Spain Location within Andalusia
- Coordinates: 37°01′48.8″N 2°59′52.2″W
- Country: Spain
- A. community: Andalucía
- Province: Almería

Government
  - Mayor: Germán Moreno

Area
  - Total: 38.02 km^{2} (14.68 sq mi)

Population (January 1, 2021)
  - Total: 322
  - Density: 8.469/km^{2} (21.93/sq mi)
- Time zone: UTC+01:00
- Postal code: 04479
- MCN: 04020
- Website: Official website

Bayárcal is a municipality of Almería province, in the autonomous community of Andalusia, Spain.

== Demographics ==
Historical population
Year	Pop.	±%
1999	334	—
2000	320	−4.2%
2001	329	+2.8%
2002	335	+1.8%
2003	315	−6.0%
2004	305	−3.2%
2005	303	−0.7%
Source: INE (Spain)

== See also ==
- List of municipalities in Almería
