= Uleila del Campo =

Uleila del Campo, Spain
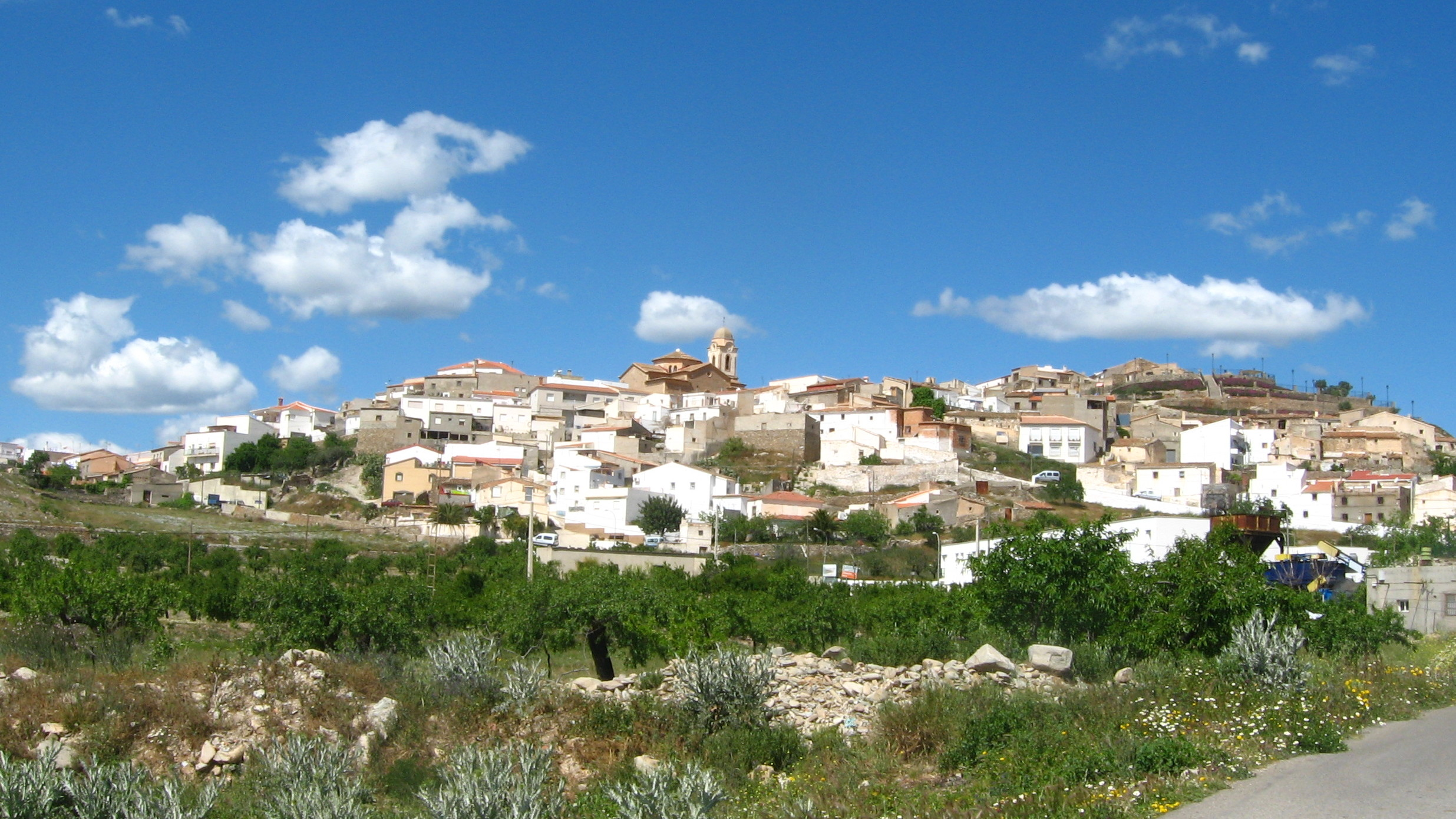
- Panoramic view of Uleila del Campo

- Flag Coat of arms
- Interactive map of Uleila del Campo, Spain
- Coordinates: 37°11′N 2°12′W
- Country: Spain
- Community: Andalusia
- Municipality: Almería

Government
  - Mayor: Águeda Cayuela Fernández (PSOE)

Area
  - Total: 39 km^{2} (15 sq mi)
- Elevation: 640 m (2,100 ft)

Population (2025-01-01)
  - Total: 815
  - Density: 21/km^{2} (54/sq mi)
- Time zone: UTC+1 (CET)
  - Summer (DST): UTC+2 (CEST)

Uleila del Campo is a municipality of Almería province, Spain.

The village has a local fiesta, Which takes place every year on the second Saturday of September, to celebrate the religious figure, Nuestra Señora de Monteagud. ADSL Internet access in the village has been available since October 2006.

== Demographics ==
Historical population
Year	Pop.	±%
1999	976	—
2000	977	+0.1%
2001	979	+0.2%
2002	1,007	+2.9%
2003	995	−1.2%
2004	972	−2.3%
2005	988	+1.6%
2017	848	−14.2%
2018	836	−1.4%
Source: INE (Spain)

== See also ==
- List of municipalities in Almería
