= Paterna del Río =

Paterna del Río, Spain
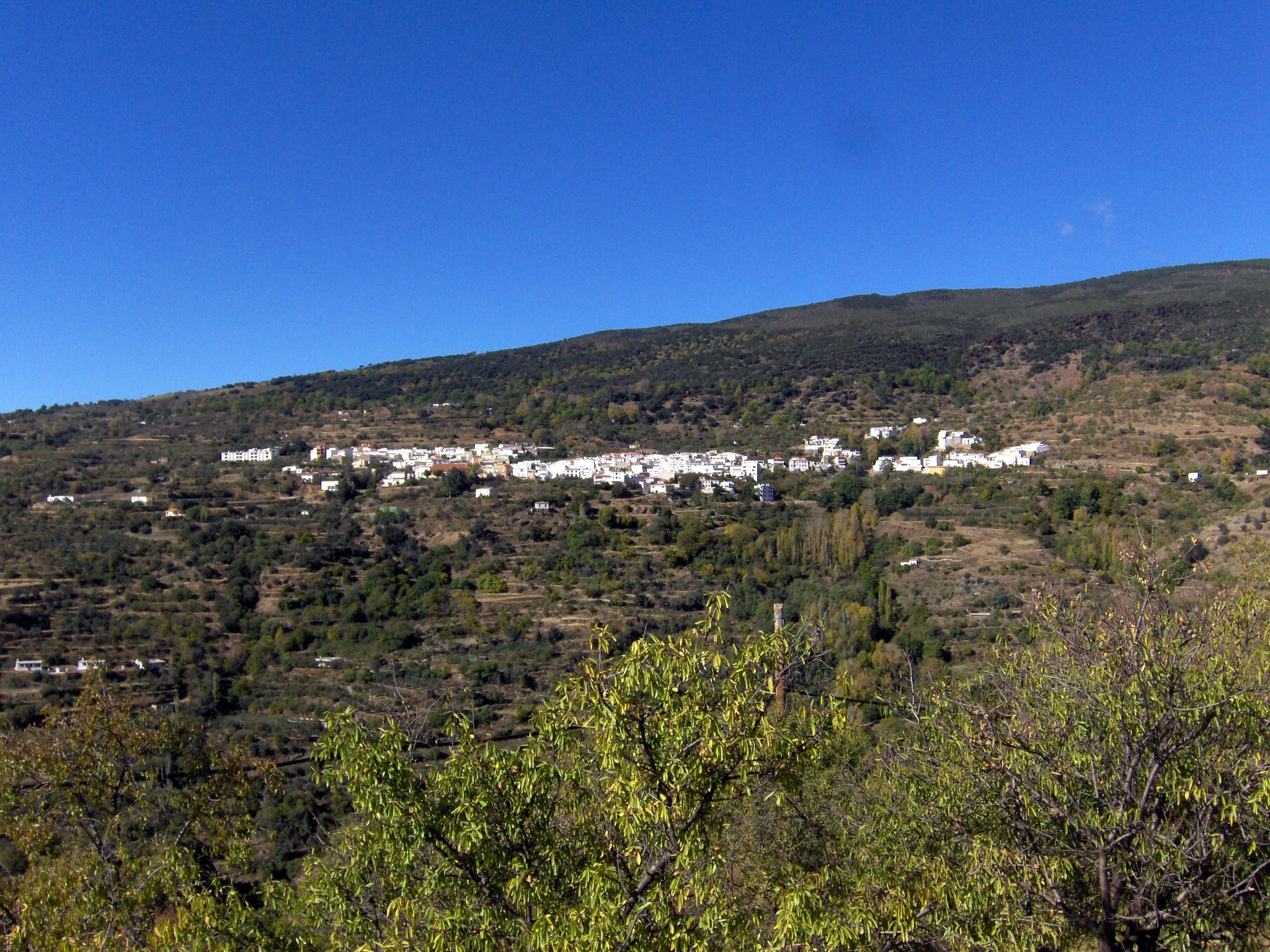
- View of Paterna del Río

- Flag Coat of arms
- Interactive map of Paterna del Río, Spain
- Coordinates: 37°01′N 2°57′W
- Country: Spain
- Community: Andalusia
- Municipality: Almería

Government
  - Mayor: Antonio Serrano Carmona (PP)

Area
  - Total: 45 km^{2} (17 sq mi)
- Elevation: 1,193 m (3,914 ft)

Population (2025-01-01)
  - Total: 399
  - Density: 8.9/km^{2} (23/sq mi)
- Time zone: UTC+1 (CET)
  - Summer (DST): UTC+2 (CEST)

Paterna del Río is a municipality of Almería province, in the autonomous community of Andalusia, Spain.

== Demographics ==
Historical population
Year	Pop.	±%
1999	383	—
2000	393	+2.6%
2001	386	−1.8%
2002	389	+0.8%
2003	419	+7.7%
2004	415	−1.0%
2005	396	−4.6%
2018	362	−8.6%
Source: INE (Spain)

== See also ==
- List of municipalities in Almería
