= Castro de Filabres =

Castro de Filabres, Spain
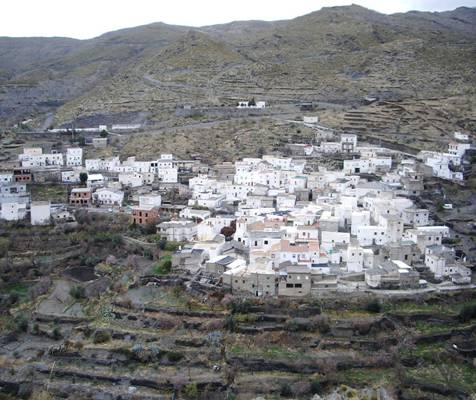
- View of Castro de Filabres

- Flag Coat of arms
- Interactive map of Castro de Filabres, Spain
- Coordinates: 37°11′N 2°26′W
- Country: Spain
- Community: Andalusia
- Municipality: Almería

Government
  - Mayor: Francisco Martínez Sola (PSOE)

Area
  - Total: 29 km^{2} (11 sq mi)
- Elevation: 960 m (3,150 ft)

Population (2025-01-01)
  - Total: 101
  - Density: 3.5/km^{2} (9.0/sq mi)
- Time zone: UTC+1 (CET)
  - Summer (DST): UTC+2 (CEST)

Castro de Filabres is a municipality of Almería province, in the autonomous community of Andalusia, Spain.

== Demographics ==
Historical population
Year	Pop.	±%
1999	181	—
2000	170	−6.1%
2001	170	+0.0%
2002	172	+1.2%
2003	166	−3.5%
2004	162	−2.4%
2005	163	+0.6%
Source: INE (Spain)

== See also ==
- List of municipalities in Almería
