= Alcolea =

- Municipality
- Flag Seal

- Location within Spain
- Coordinates: 36°58′28.1″N 2°57′49.1″W
- Country: Spain
- A. community: Andalucía
- Province: Almería

Government
  - Mayor: Antonio Ocaña

Area
  - Total: 67.52 km^{2} (26.07 sq mi)

Population (January 1, 2021)
  - Total: 853
  - Density: 12.63/km^{2} (32.7/sq mi)
- Time zone: UTC+01:00
- Postal code: 04480, 04768
- MCN: 04007
- Website: Official website

Alcolea is a municipality of Almería province, in Spain.

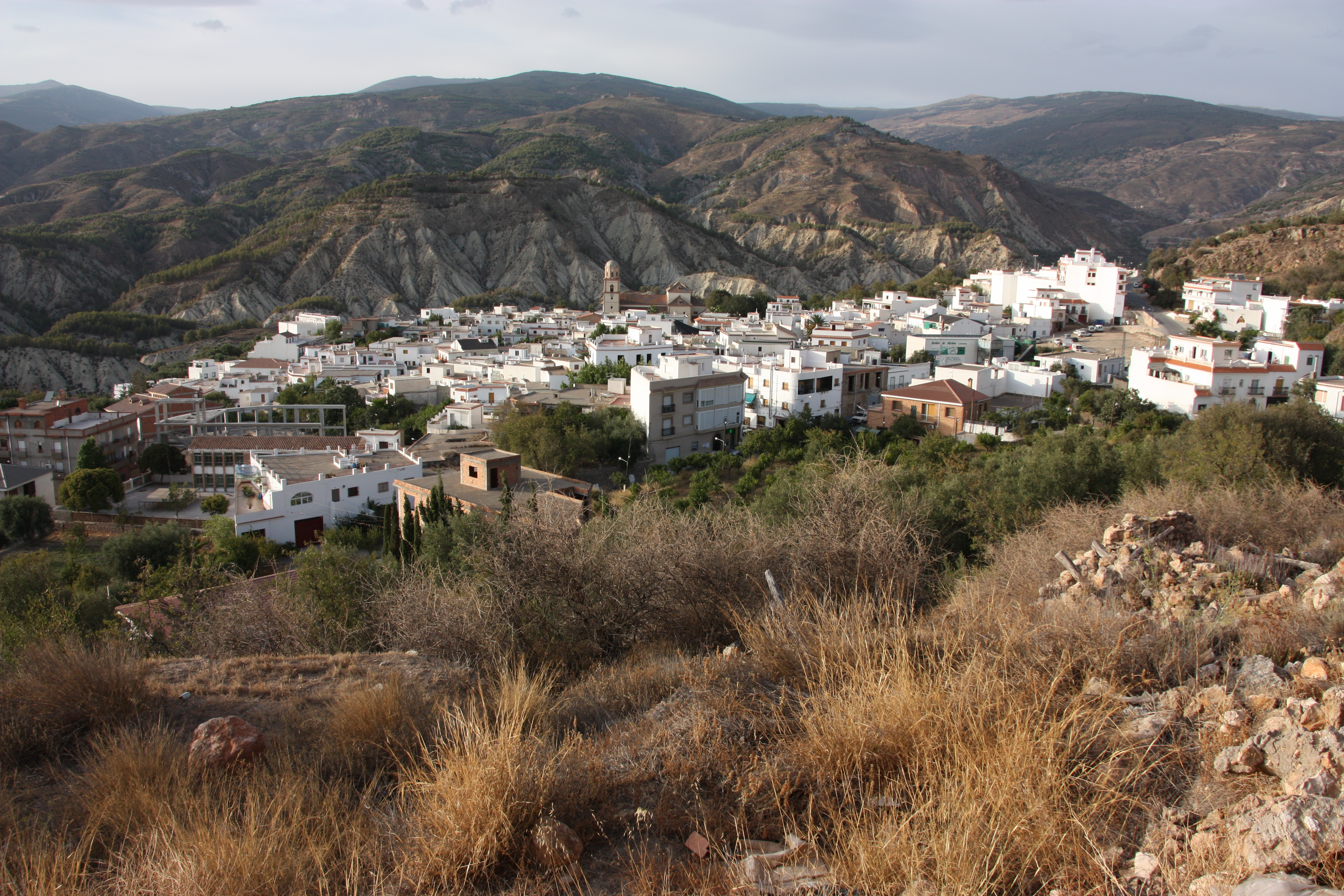
Alcolea view from the mountain

Historically, there was a Jewish community that existed from 1320-1414. After the disputation of Tortosa, the community ceased to exist.

== Demographics ==
Historical population
Year	Pop.	±%
1999	856	—
2000	903	+5.5%
2001	906	+0.3%
2002	923	+1.9%
2003	1,018	+10.3%
2004	1,009	−0.9%
2005	966	−4.3%
2006	967	+0.1%
2007	957	−1.0%
2008	927	−3.1%
2009	908	−2.0%
2010	902	−0.7%
2011	916	+1.6%
2012	966	+5.5%
2013	895	−7.3%
2014	861	−3.8%
2015	812	−5.7%
2016	815	+0.4%
2017	811	−0.5%
2018	814	+0.4%
2019	825	+1.4%
Source: INE (Spain)

== See also ==
- List of municipalities in Almería
