= Alcudia de Monteagud =

- Municipality
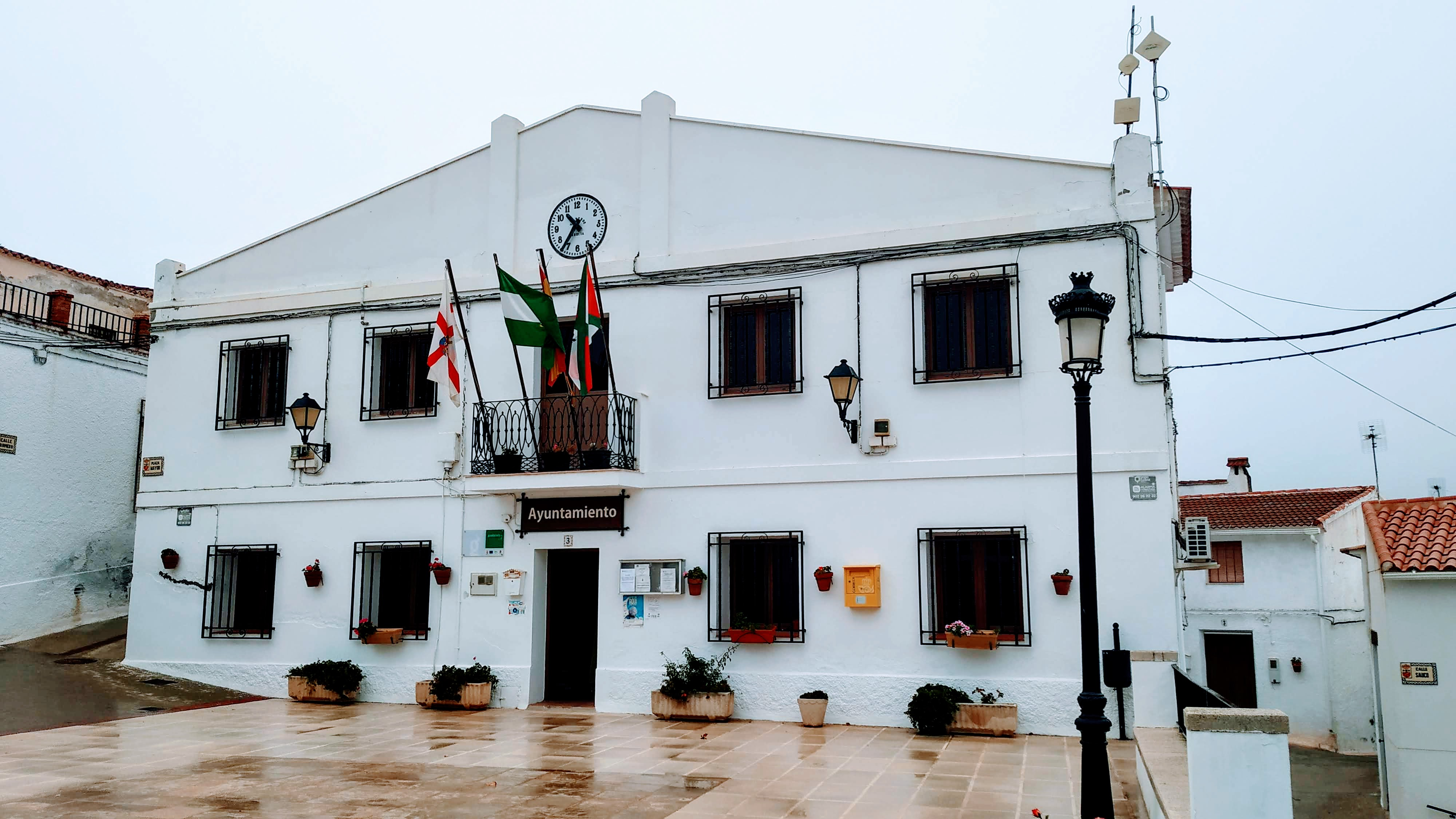
- Town hall

- Flag Seal

- Location within Spain
- Coordinates: 37°14′09.8″N 2°16′07.7″W
- Country: Spain
- A. community: Andalucía
- Province: Almería

Government
  - Mayor: Juan Manuel Sánchez

Area
  - Total: 15.52 km^{2} (5.99 sq mi)

Population (January 1, 2021)
  - Total: 128
  - Density: 8.247/km^{2} (21.36/sq mi)
- Time zone: UTC+01:00
- Postal code: 04276
- MCN: 04009
- Website: Official website

Alcudia de Monteagud is a municipality of Almería Province, Spain.

== Demographics ==
Historical population
Year	Pop.	±%
1999	194	—
2000	209	+7.7%
2001	193*	—
2002	190	—
2003	152	−20.0%
2004	166	+9.2%
2005	158	−4.8%
Source: INE (Spain)

== See also ==
- List of municipalities in Almería
