= Benizalón =

- Municipality
- Flag Seal

- Location within Spain
- Coordinates: 37°12′42.9″N 2°14′39.4″W
- Country: Spain
- A. community: Andalucía
- Province: Almería

Government
  - Mayor: Alejandro Cid

Area
  - Total: 31.97 km^{2} (12.34 sq mi)

Population (January 1, 2021)
  - Total: 259
  - Density: 8.101/km^{2} (20.98/sq mi)
- Time zone: UTC+01:00
- Postal code: 04276
- MCN: 04027
- Website: Official website

Benizalón is a municipality of the Almería province, in the autonomous community of Andalusia, Spain.

== Demographics ==
Historical population
Year	Pop.	±%
1999	324	—
2000	304	−6.2%
2001	291	−4.3%
2002	309	+6.2%
2003	305	−1.3%
2004	302	−1.0%
2005	308	+2.0%
Source: INE (Spain)

== See also ==
- List of municipalities in Almería
