= Benitagla =

- Municipality
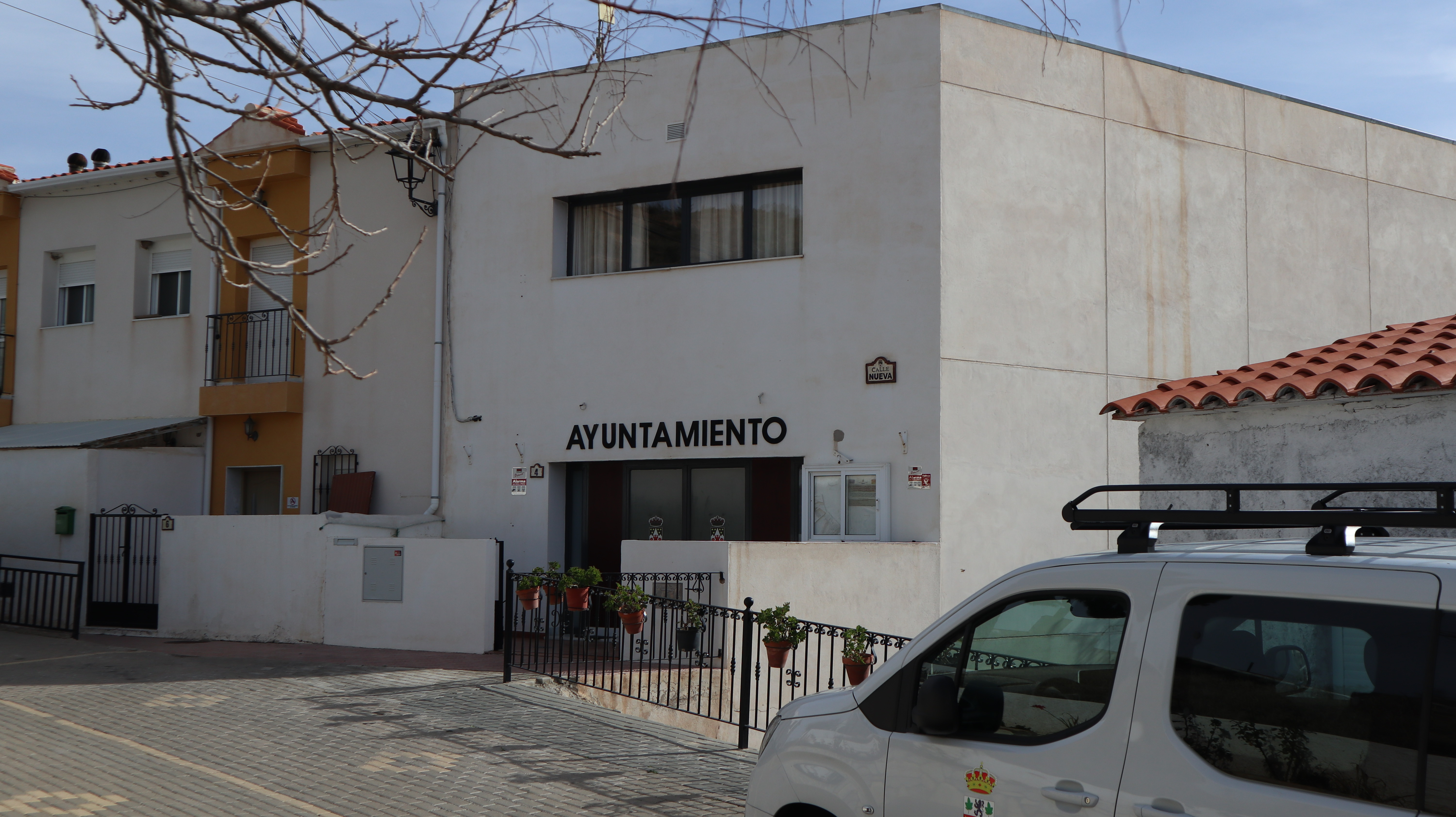
- Town hall

- Flag Seal

- Location within Spain
- Coordinates: 37°13′54″N 2°14′20″W
- Country: Spain
- A. community: Andalucía
- Province: Almería

Government
  - Mayor: Juan Padilla

Area
  - Total: 6.397 km^{2} (2.470 sq mi)

Population (January 1, 2021)
  - Total: 59
  - Density: 9.223/km^{2} (23.89/sq mi)
- Time zone: UTC+01:00
- Postal code: 04276
- MCN: 04026
- Website: Official website

Benitagla is a municipality of Almería province, in the autonomous community of Andalusia, Spain.

== Demographics ==
Historical population
Year	Pop.	±%
1999	86	—
2000	92	+7.0%
2001	89	−3.3%
2002	80	−10.1%
2003	68	−15.0%
2004	66	−2.9%
2005	65	−1.5%
Source: INE (Spain)

== See also ==
- List of municipalities in Almería
