= Alsodux =

Alsodux, Spain
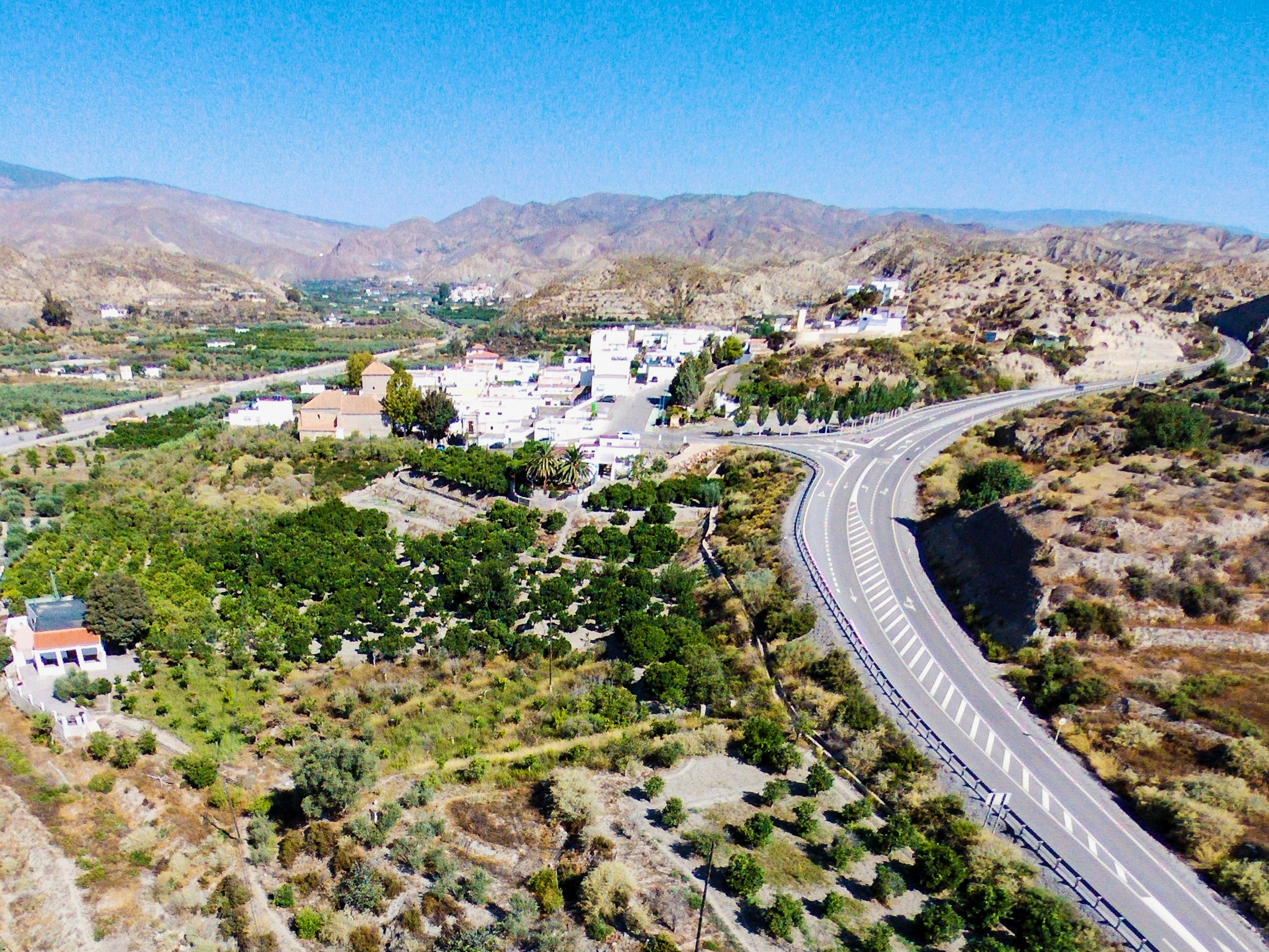
- General View of Alsodux

- Flag Coat of arms
- Interactive map of Alsodux, Spain
- Coordinates: 37°00′N 2°35′W
- Country: Spain
- Community: Andalusia
- Municipality: Almería

Government
  - Mayor: Amador Sáez Sáez (PP)

Area
  - Total: 20 km^{2} (7.7 sq mi)
- Elevation: 310 m (1,020 ft)

Population (2025-01-01)
  - Total: 126
  - Density: 6.3/km^{2} (16/sq mi)
- Time zone: UTC+1 (CET)
  - Summer (DST): UTC+2 (CEST)

Alsodux is a municipality of Almería province, in the autonomous community of Andalusia, Spain.

== Demographics ==
Historical population
Year	Pop.	±%
1999	105	—
2000	104	−1.0%
2001	113	+8.7%
2002	112	−0.9%
2003	109	−2.7%
2004	119	+9.2%
2005	121	+1.7%
Source: INE (Spain)

== See also ==
- List of municipalities in Almería
