= Beires =

Beires, Spain
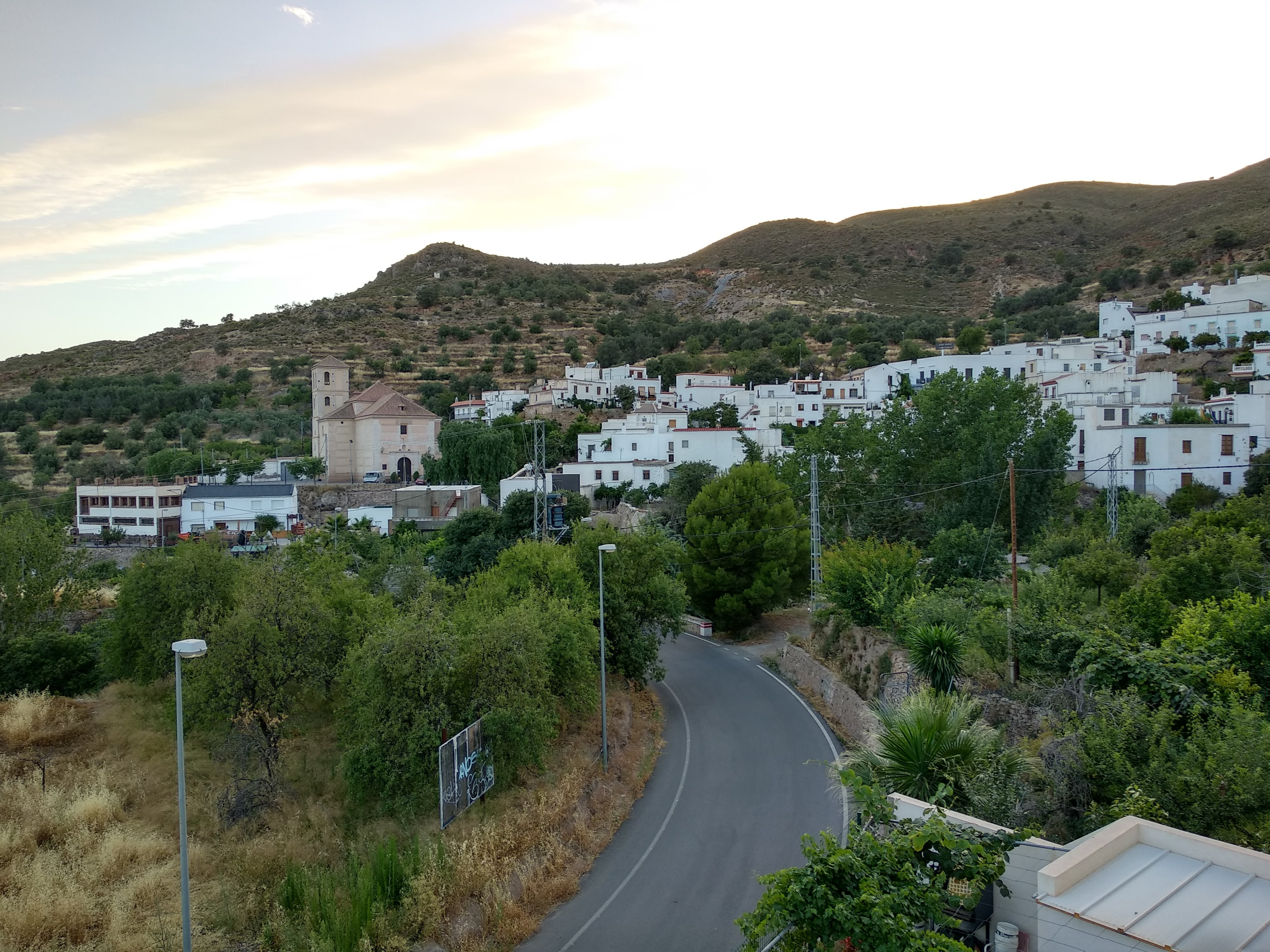

- Flag Coat of arms
- Interactive map of Beires, Spain
- Coordinates: 37°01′N 2°47′W
- Country: Spain
- Community: Andalusia
- Municipality: Almería

Government
  - Mayor: Antonio Yebra López (PP)

Area
  - Total: 39 km^{2} (15 sq mi)
- Elevation: 909 m (2,982 ft)

Population (2025-01-01)
  - Total: 140
  - Density: 3.6/km^{2} (9.3/sq mi)
- Time zone: UTC+1 (CET)
  - Summer (DST): UTC+2 (CEST)

Beires is a municipality of Almería province, in the autonomous community of Andalusia, Spain.

== Demographics ==
Historical population
Year	Pop.	±%
1999	144	—
2000	142	−1.4%
2001	138	−2.8%
2002	135	−2.2%
2003	121	−10.4%
2004	121	+0.0%
2005	126	+4.1%
Source: INE (Spain)

== See also ==
- List of municipalities in Almería
