= Nacimiento, Spain =

- Flag Coat of arms
- Interactive map of Nacimiento, Spain
- Coordinates: 37°06′N 2°38′W
- Country: Spain
- Community: Andalusia
- Municipality: Almería

Government
  - Mayor: Basilisa Ibáñez Alba (PSOE)

Area
  - Total: 81 km^{2} (31 sq mi)
- Elevation: 809 m (2,654 ft)

Population (2025-01-01)
  - Total: 485
  - Density: 6.0/km^{2} (16/sq mi)
- Time zone: UTC+1 (CET)
  - Summer (DST): UTC+2 (CEST)

Nacimiento is a municipality of Almería province, in the autonomous community of Andalusia, Spain.

== Demographics ==
Historical population
Year	Pop.	±%
1999	528	—
2000	515	−2.5%
2001	509	−1.2%
2002	482	−5.3%
2003	466	−3.3%
2004	465	−0.2%
2005	467	+0.4%
Source: INE (Spain)

== See also ==
- List of municipalities in Almería
