= Rágol =

Rágol, Spain
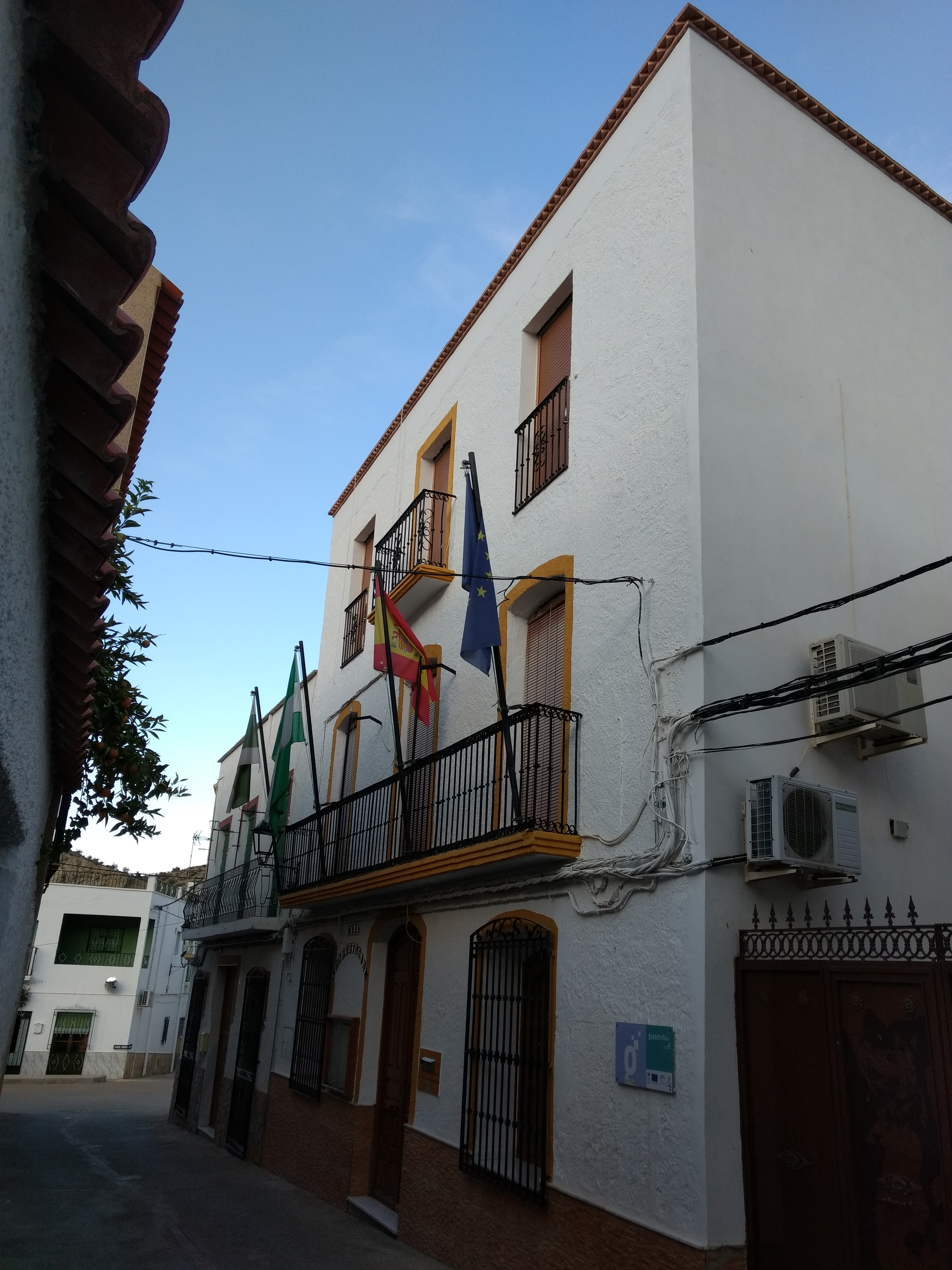
- Town hall

- Flag Coat of arms
- Interactive map of Rágol, Spain
- Coordinates: 36.9949542°N 2.681227°W
- Country: Spain
- Community: Andalusia
- Municipality: Almería

Government
  - Mayor: Juan Salas Mata (PSOE)

Area
  - Total: 27 km^{2} (10 sq mi)
- Elevation: 425 m (1,394 ft)

Population (2025-01-01)
  - Total: 297
  - Density: 11/km^{2} (28/sq mi)
- Time zone: UTC+1 (CET)
  - Summer (DST): UTC+2 (CEST)

Rágol is a municipality of Almería province, in the autonomous community of Andalusia, Spain.

== Demographics ==
Historical population
| Year | Pop. | ±% |
|---|---|---|
| 1999 | 398 | — |
| 2000 | 390 | −2.0% |
| 2001 | 391 | +0.3% |
| 2002 | 392 | +0.3% |
| 2003 | 386 | −1.5% |
| 2004 | 382 | −1.0% |
| 2005 | 367 | −3.9% |
Source: INE (Spain)

== See also ==
- List of municipalities in Almería
