= Tahal =

Tahal, Spain
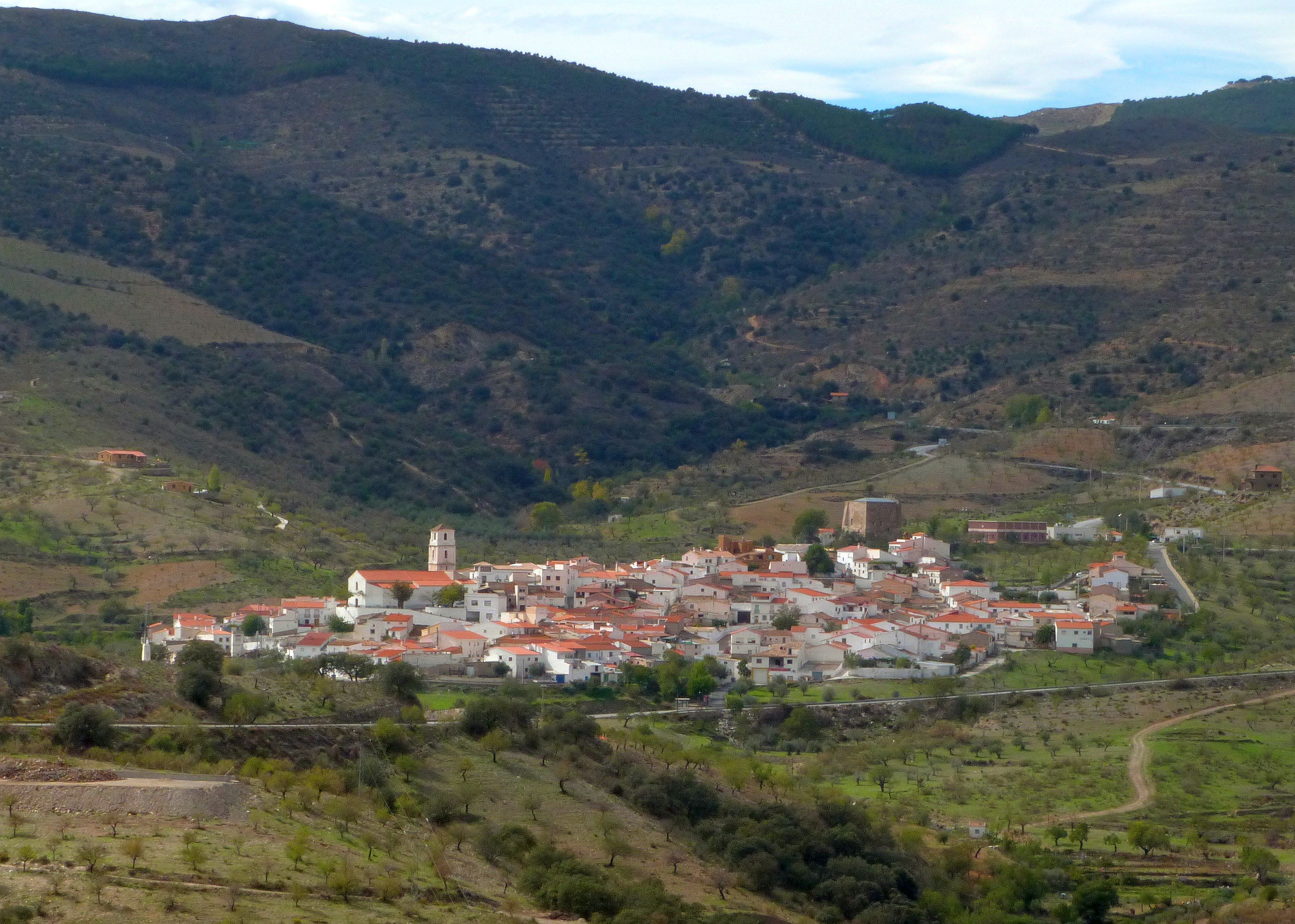
- Panoramic view of Tahal

- Flag Coat of arms
- Interactive map of Tahal, Spain
- Coordinates: 37°13′N 2°17′W
- Country: Spain
- Community: Andalusia
- Municipality: Almería

Government
  - Mayor: Juan Antonio Cid Rosa (PSOE)

Area
  - Total: 95 km^{2} (37 sq mi)
- Elevation: 1,010 m (3,310 ft)

Population (2025-01-01)
  - Total: 355
  - Density: 3.7/km^{2} (9.7/sq mi)
- Time zone: UTC+1 (CET)
  - Summer (DST): UTC+2 (CEST)

Tahal (Spanish: [taˈal]) is a municipality of Almería province, in the autonomous community of Andalusia, Spain.

== Demographics ==
Historical population
Year	Pop.	±%
1999	392	—
2000	407	+3.8%
2001	395	−2.9%
2002	378	−4.3%
2003	373	−1.3%
2004	385	+3.2%
2005	383	−0.5%
Source: INE (Spain)

== See also ==
- List of municipalities in Almería
