= Instinción =

Instinción, Spain
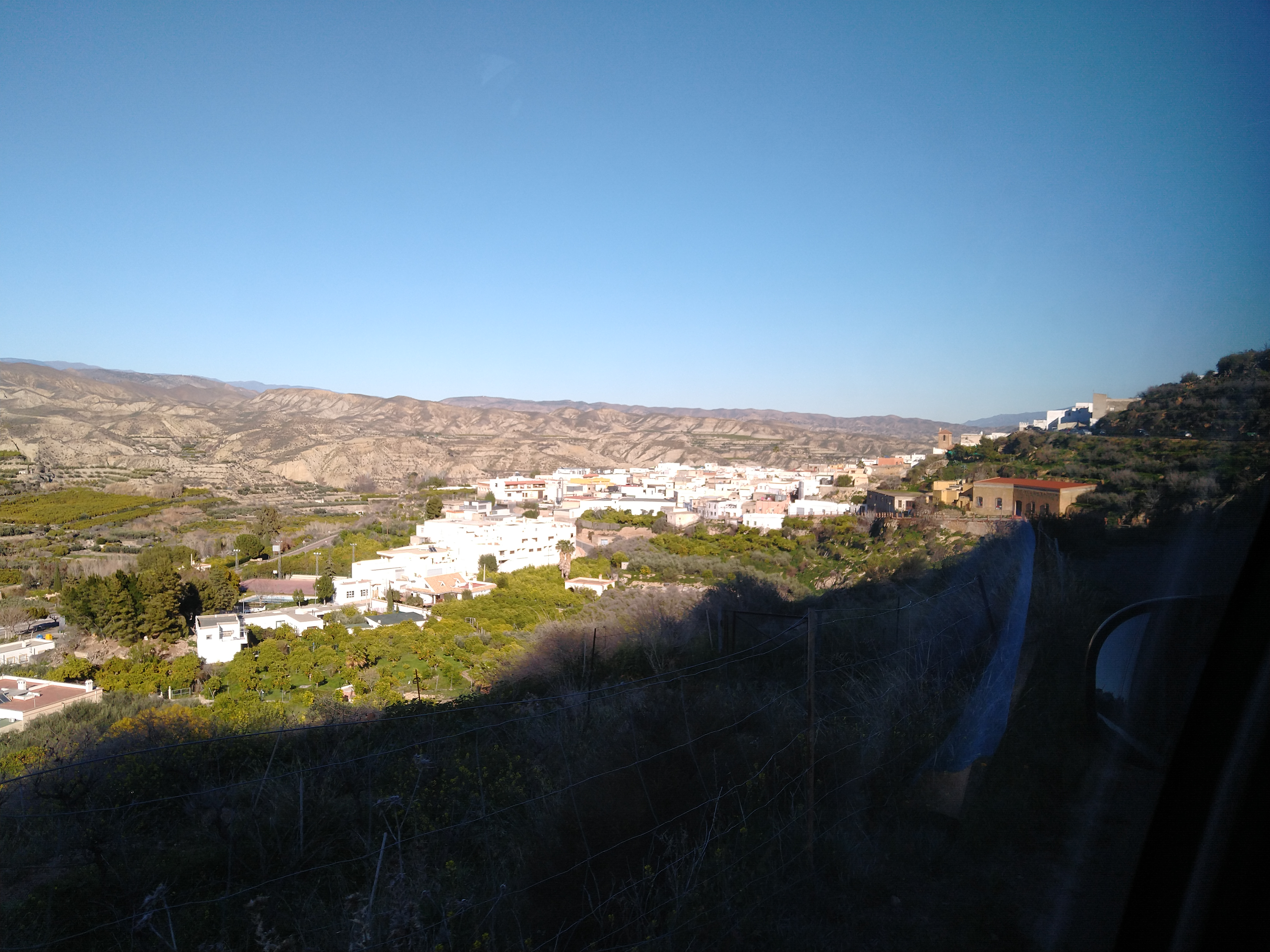
- View of Instinción

- Flag Coat of arms
- Interactive map of Instinción, Spain
- Coordinates: 36.992898°N 2.659598°W
- Country: Spain
- Community: Andalusia
- Municipality: Almería

Government
  - Mayor: Emilio Milán Molina (PSOE)

Area
  - Total: 33 km^{2} (13 sq mi)
- Elevation: 431 m (1,414 ft)

Population (2025-01-01)
  - Total: 507
  - Density: 15/km^{2} (40/sq mi)
- Time zone: UTC+1 (CET)
  - Summer (DST): UTC+2 (CEST)

Instinción (Spanish: [instinˈθjon]) is a municipality of Almería province, in the autonomous community of Andalusia, Spain.

== Demographics ==
Historical population
Year	Pop.	±%
1999	544	—
2000	538	−1.1%
2001	538	+0.0%
2002	531	−1.3%
2003	533	+0.4%
2004	527	−1.1%
2005	524	−0.6%
Source: INE (Spain)

== See also ==
- List of municipalities in Almería
