= Almócita =

- Municipality
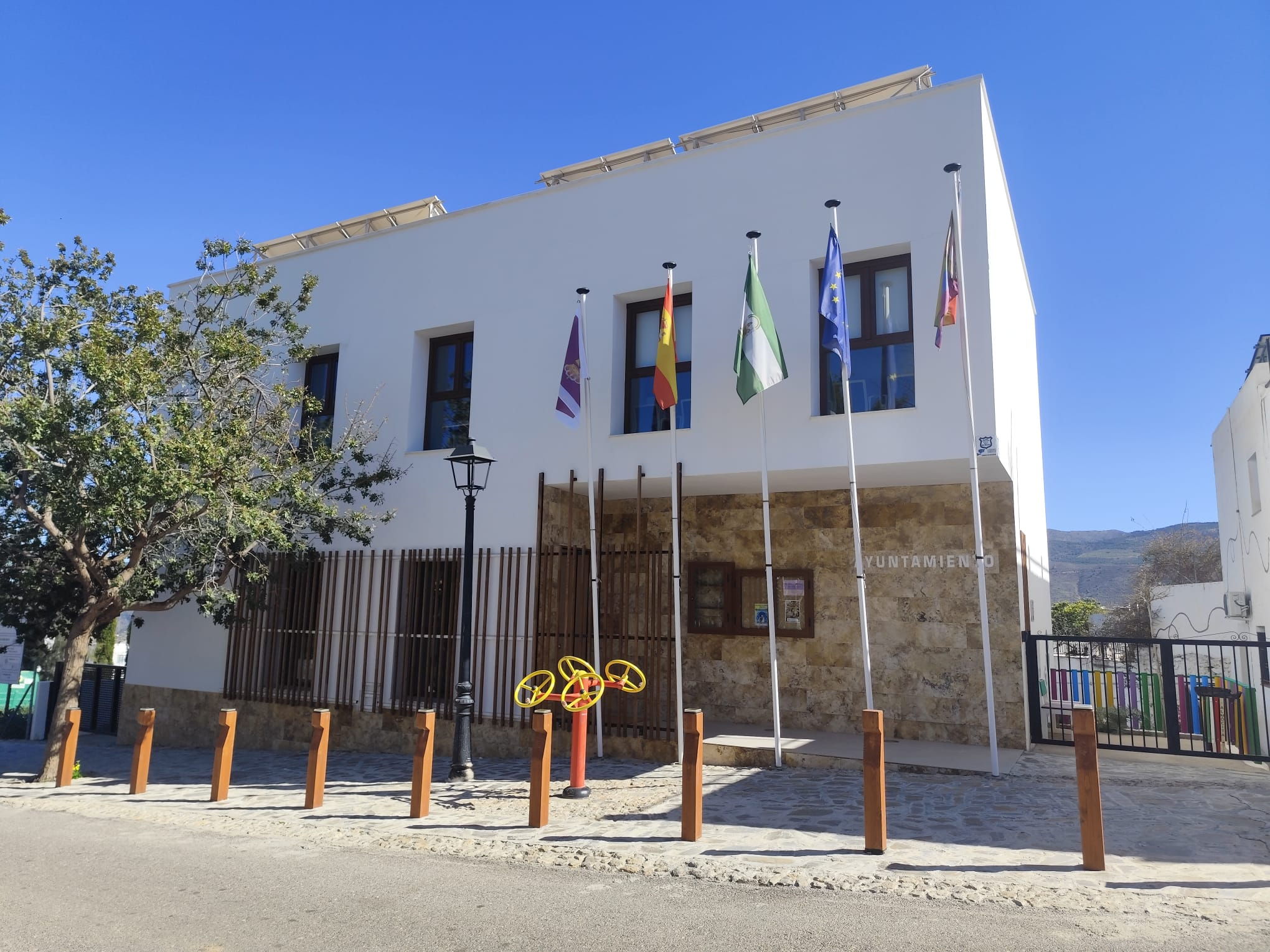
- Town hall

- Flag Seal

- Location within Spain
- Coordinates: 37°00′10.4″N 2°47′35.0″W
- Country: Spain
- A. community: Andalucía
- Province: Almería

Government
  - Mayor: Francisco García

Area
  - Total: 30.83 km^{2} (11.90 sq mi)

Population (January 1, 2021)
  - Total: 197
  - Density: 6.39/km^{2} (16.6/sq mi)
- Time zone: UTC+01:00
- Postal code: 04458
- MCN: 04014
- Website: Official website

Almócita is a municipality of Almería province, in the autonomous community of Andalusia, Spain.

== Demographics ==
Historical population
Year	Pop.	±%
1999	185	—
2000	175	−5.4%
2001	166	−5.1%
2002	162	−2.4%
2003	161	−0.6%
2004	165	+2.5%
2005	167	+1.2%
Source: INE (Spain)

== See also ==
- List of municipalities in Almería
