= Alhabia =

- Municipality
- Flag Seal

- Location within Spain
- Coordinates: 36°59′22.6″N 2°35′24.1″W
- Country: Spain
- A. community: Andalucía
- Province: Almería

Government
  - Mayor: Luis Manuel Martínez

Area
  - Total: 16.39 km^{2} (6.33 sq mi)

Population (January 1, 2021)
  - Total: 677
  - Density: 41.31/km^{2} (107.0/sq mi)
- Time zone: UTC+01:00
- Postal code: 04567
- MCN: 04010
- Website: Official website

Alhabia is a municipality of Almería province, in Spain.

== Demographics ==
Historical population
Year	Pop.	±%
1999	670	—
2000	672	+0.3%
2001	683	+1.6%
2002	681	−0.3%
2003	676	−0.7%
2004	679	+0.4%
2005	692	+1.9%
Source: INE (Spain)

== See also ==
- List of municipalities in Almería
