= Santa Cruz de Marchena =

Santa Cruz de Marchena, Spain
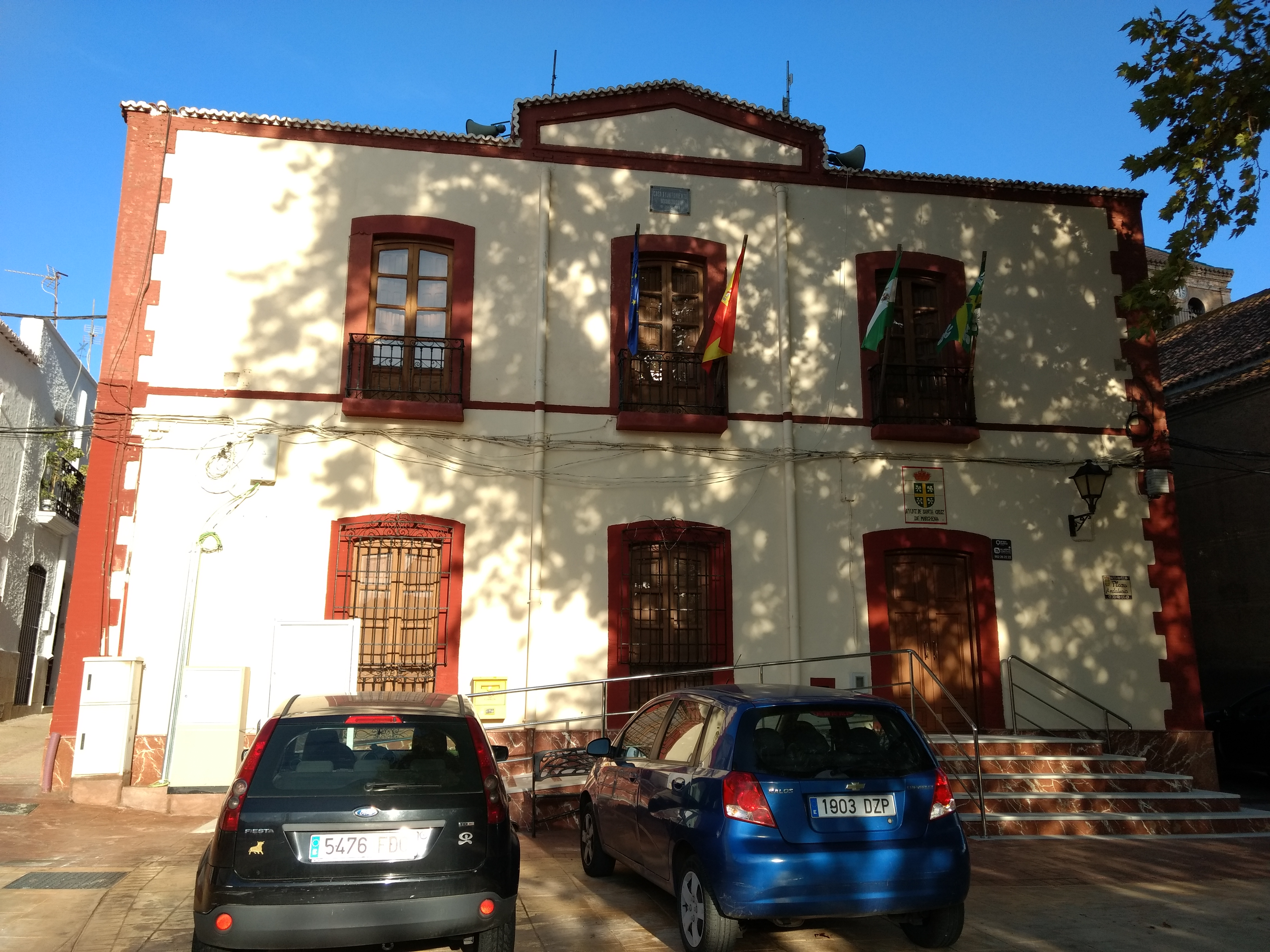
- Town hall

- Flag Coat of arms
- Interactive map of Santa Cruz de Marchena, Spain
- Coordinates: 37.017222°N 2.603611°W 37°1'2"N, 2°36'13"W
- Country: Spain
- Community: Andalusia
- Municipality: Almería

Government
  - Mayor: Antonio Abad García (PP)

Area
  - Total: 20 km^{2} (7.7 sq mi)
- Elevation: 325 m (1,066 ft)

Population (2025-01-01)
  - Total: 236
  - Density: 12/km^{2} (31/sq mi)
- Time zone: UTC+1 (CET)
  - Summer (DST): UTC+2 (CEST)

Santa Cruz de Marchena is a municipality of Almería province, in the autonomous community of Andalusia, Spain.

== Demographics ==
Historical population
Year	Pop.	±%
1999	215	—
2000	208	−3.3%
2001	209	+0.5%
2002	200	−4.3%
2003	204	+2.0%
2004	204	+0.0%
2005	237	+16.2%
Source: INE (Spain)

== See also ==
- List of municipalities in Almería
