= Padules =

Padules, Spain
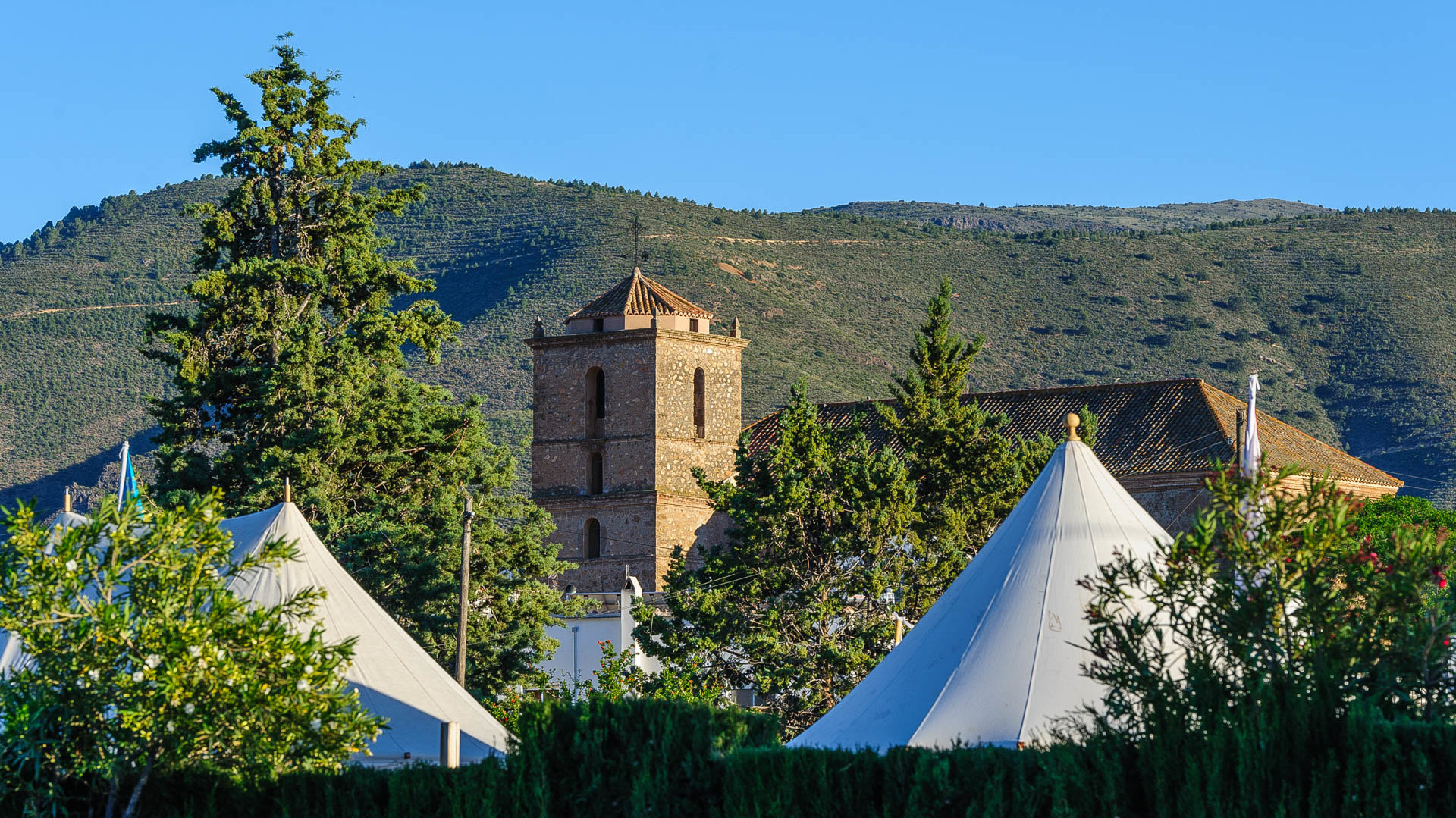
- The cathedral of Santa María la Mayor

- Flag Coat of arms

- Location within Spain
- Coordinates: 37°0′N 2°46′W
- Country: Spain
- Community: Andalusia
- Municipality: Almería

Government
  - Mayor: Antonio Gutiérrez Romero (PSOE)

Area
  - Total: 27 km^{2} (10 sq mi)
- Elevation: 754 m (2,474 ft)

Population (2025-01-01)
  - Total: 438
  - Density: 16/km^{2} (42/sq mi)
- Time zone: UTC+1 (CET)
  - Summer (DST): UTC+2 (CEST)

Padules is a municipality of Almería province, in the autonomous community of Andalusia, Spain.

== Demographics ==
Historical population
Year	Pop.	±%
1999	491	—
2000	481	−2.0%
2001	475	−1.2%
2002	466	−1.9%
2003	449	−3.6%
2004	455	+1.3%
2005	504	+10.8%
2018	419	−16.9%
Source: INE (Spain)

== See also ==
- List of municipalities in Almería
