= Íllar =

Illar, Spain
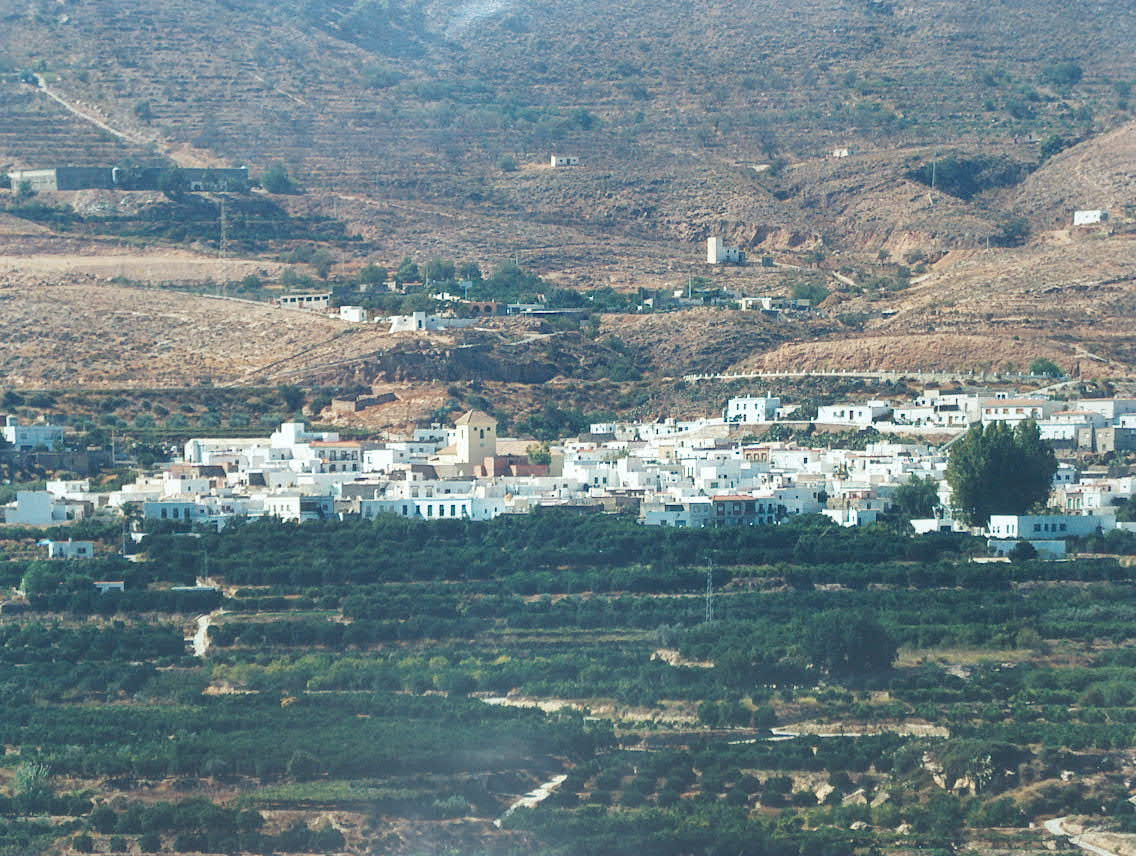
- View of Íllar

- Flag Coat of arms

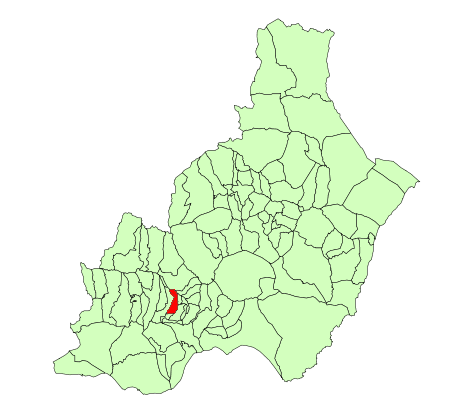
- Illar, in red, shown in Almería

- Location within Spain
- Coordinates: 36°59′N 2°38′W
- Country: Spain
- Community: Andalusia
- Municipality: Almería

Government
  - Mayor: Antonio Sánchez Salmerón (PP)

Area
  - Total: 19 km^{2} (7.3 sq mi)
- Elevation: 425 m (1,394 ft)

Population (2025-01-01)
  - Total: 492
  - Density: 26/km^{2} (67/sq mi)
- Time zone: UTC+1 (CET)
  - Summer (DST): UTC+2 (CEST)

Illar is a municipality in the Almería province, an autonomous community of Andalusia, Spain.

== Demographics ==
Historical population
Year	Pop.	±%
1999	468	—
2000	474	+1.3%
2001	458	−3.4%
2002	457	−0.2%
2003	435	−4.8%
2004	423	−2.8%
2005	419	−0.9%
Source: INE (Spain)

== Geography ==
Íllar is located near the river Andarax, between Sierra de Gádor and Sierra Nevada. Its borders stretch from Huécija and Bentarique to the east, Instinción to the west, Alboloduy to the north, and a part of Bentarique to the south.

== History ==
=== Middle Ages ===
Íllar appeared to be named by the Andalusian geographer Idrisi in the 12th century for the purpose of colonization and to increase tax capacity. From the 13th century, when the Kingdom of Granada was the only Muslim territory in the Iberian Peninsula, Íllar formed a part, together with other 10 localities, of Marchena's taha, a traditional fief of the al-Nayar family.

=== Renaissance ===
Íllar was conquered by Christian forces after the surrender of Baza and the capitulation of Almería in 1489. Marchena's former taha was granted as it rewarded Gutierre de Cárdenas y Chacón by the Catholic Monarchs in 1494, for having taken part in the conquest. In the 16th century, a revolt took place, followed later the expulsion of the Muslims. After that, the locality remained uninhabited until the 17th and 18th century.

=== Industrial age ===
The 19th century saw the rise of liberalism and the abolition of the dominions in 1835. Íllar and the rest of the localities of Marchena's former taha were constituted as municipalities. The period was characterized by population increase thanks to the growth of agriculture, facilitated principally by cultivation of grapes in Ohanes. Prosperity was reflected in several buildings of the middle class. The fountain, the washer in 1871, the Summer-house and the headquarters of the Town were constructed in historicist style. This economic growth continued until the 1930s, when it was interrupted as a consequence of a great drought and social problems connected with the Spanish Civil War and a hard postwar period characterized by a high rate of emigration.

== Administration ==
The municipality is administered through a City Council to which representatives are elected every four years by universal suffrage. The electorate consists of all the residents registered in Íllar of 18 years or older, natives of Spain, and citizens of other members of the European Union. As specified by the Ley del Régimen Electoral General (Law of the Electoral General Regime), Íllar's Municipal Corporation consists of 7 councillors. The headquarters is situated in the Plaza de la Constitución.

=== 2007 municipal election ===
In the 2007 municipal election, the Partido Popular (People's Party, PP) won 5 councillors, and mayor Antonio Sanchez Salmerón was reelected. The Partido Socialista Obrero Español (Spanish Labour Socialist Labour Party, PSOE) won 2 councillors, while the Partido de Almería (PDAL), and the Grupo Independiente por Almería (Almería Independent Group, GIAL) did not obtain representation.

== Monuments ==
Civil monuments:

- Fountain and washer (1871)

Religious monuments:

- Santa Ana's Church: A building constructed in the 16th century in the Mudéjar style. It features a wood vault and a small Baroque front made of stucco.

== See also ==
- List of municipalities in Almería
