= Giner =

Giner is a surname. Notable people with the surname include:

- Fernando Giner (born 1964), Spanish footballer
- Ferrán Giner Peris (born 1988), Spanish footballer
- Francisco Giner de los Ríos (1839–1915), Spanish philosopher and educator
- Gloria Giner de los Ríos García (1886–1970), Spanish educator
- Isabel Ferrer Giner (1736–1794), Spanish noblewoman and philanthropist
- Juan Giner (born 1978), Spanish tennis player
- Manuel Giner Miralles (1926–2019), Spanish doctor, entrepreneur and politician
- Oka Giner (born 1992), Mexican actress
- Práxedes Giner Durán (1893–1978), Mexican politician
- Salvador Giner (1934–2019), Spanish sociologist
- Silvia Giner (born 1980), Spanish actress
- Vicente Giner (c. 1636–1681), Spanish canon and painter
- Yevgeni Giner (born 1960), Russian businessman
