= Emilio Ruiz Muñoz =

Spanish Roman Catholic priest and press commentator

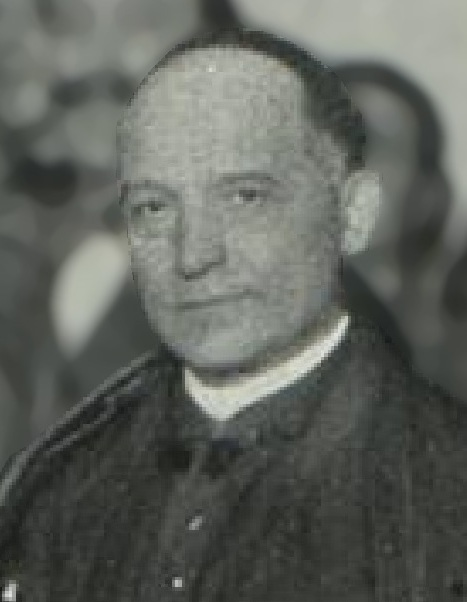
- Muñoz in 1928
- Born: Emilio Ruiz Muñoz; 1874; Almería, Spain
- Died: 1936; Madrid, Spain
- Occupation: religious
- Known for: press commentator, theorist
- Political party: Integrism, Carlism

Emilio Ruiz Muñoz (1874–1936) was a Spanish Roman-Catholic priest and press commentator, known mostly by his pen-name Fabio. Since 1913 he served as a canon by the Málaga cathedral, though from 1920 onwards the role was rather titular, as he resided mostly in Madrid. Between 1906 and 1936 he contributed some 3,000 articles to the Traditionalist daily El Siglo Futuro, and became recognized as a point of reference for intransigent, militant, ultra-right Catholicism. Politically until the early 1930s he supported Integrism; afterwards he retained the Integrist outlook, but operated within the united Carlist structures and emerged as one of key Carlist intellectuals of the mid-1930s.

== Family and youth ==
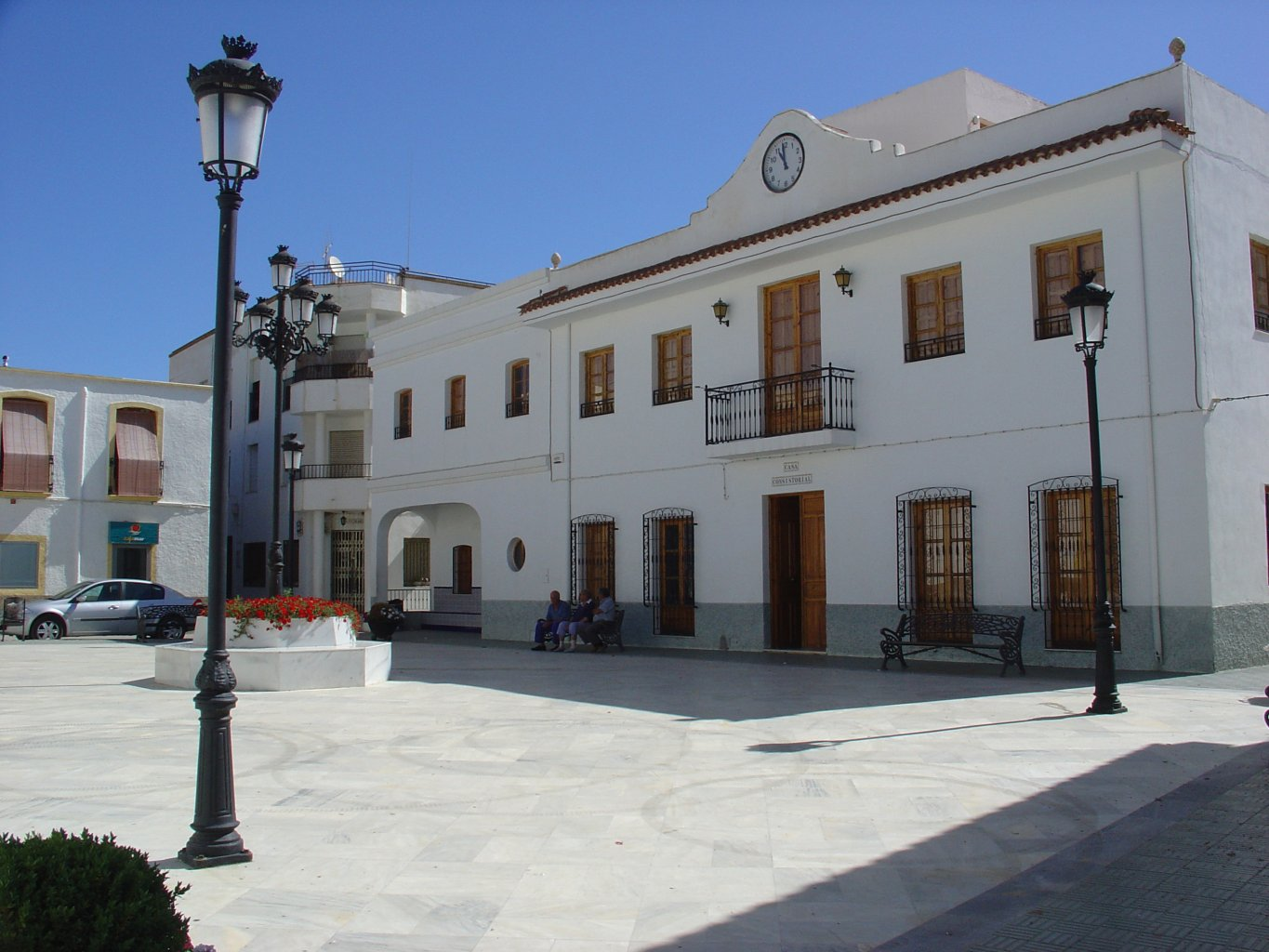
Bentarique, town hall

Distant paternal ancestors of Ruiz Muñoz are unknown. There is little certain about his father, Francisco Ruiz Ramírez (died as “anciano” 1927). In the late 1880s he was noted in relation to Bentarique, a village in the Almería province, and apparently counted among prestigious locals, yet it is not clear what he was doing for a living. He formed part of the local committee, which supported the liberal politician and former president of the First Spanish Republic, Emilio Castelar. He remained related to Partido Liberal also later, noted as its adherent in 1900. The family dominated the municipality, since at the time many of its members held seats in the local ayuntamiento. In the early 20th century Francisco served as teniente de alcalde and in 1904 was reported as elected the mayor of Bentarique, though the election was contested and remained the source of controversy for a few years to come. In 1909 he was again reported merely as a councillor. He remained a locally recognized figure, since in the 1910s local Almería newspapers noted him on societé columns and later his funeral would be attended by the civil governor.

At unspecified time Ruiz Ramírez married Aurora Muñoz Reina (1843–1920). There is little known of either her or her family, except that her younger brother—and Emilio's maternal uncle—was Francisco de Paula Muñoz Reina. Ordained a priest, in the 1880s he served as a presbyter in Málaga, then parson of the San Pedro church, and finally the dean of the cathedral, becoming a prestigious personality in the city. It is known that he and his nephew maintained very close relations, as reportedly Francisco loved Emilio “like a father”. The uncle was a Traditionalist of the Integrist branch and the follower of Ramón Nocedal; also the father at unspecified time abandoned liberalism and converted to Integrism. It is not clear how many children Francisco and Aurora had; there is none except Emilio known.

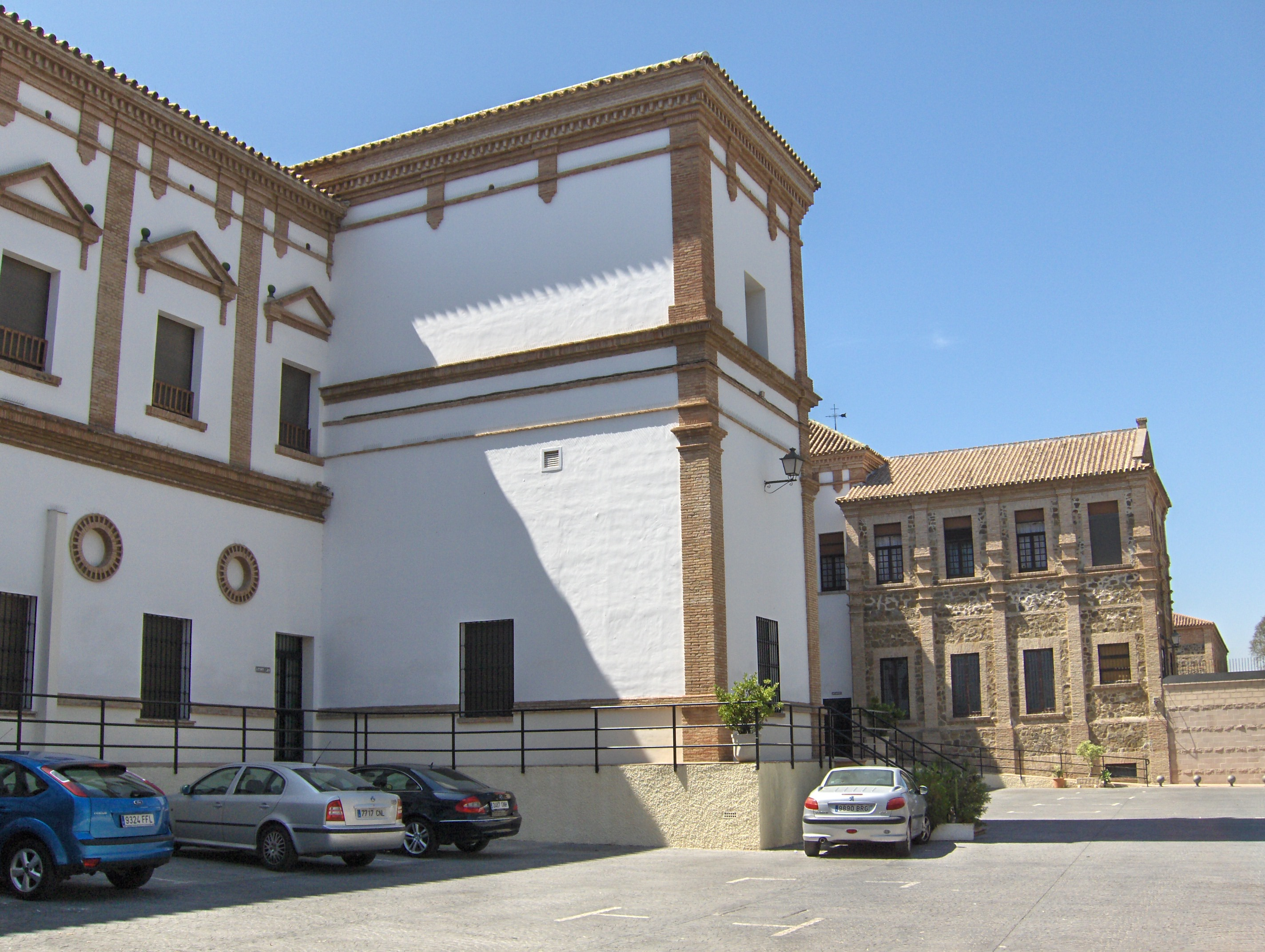
Málaga seminary

According to some sources Emilio's parents moved from Bentarique to Málaga, where reportedly the boy received his primary education; this information is incompatible with sources which claim that at the time his father was still related to Bentarique. Some data might suggest Emilio later frequented Colegio de 2a Enseñanza in Terque (a municipality 2 km from Bentarique); the college was a branch of the Almería Instituto, the state-run secondary education establishment. At unspecified time, though most likely in the early 1890s, the adolescent Emilio decided to follow in the footsteps of his uncle and to commence an ecclesiastic career; he entered the seminary in Málaga. Exact years of education as a seminarist are unknown, yet most likely it was completed prior to 1901; by this time he must have been also ordained a priest, since in 1901 he already appears as a presbyter. He double-majored, graduating both in theology and in canon law.

== Ecclesiastic career ==
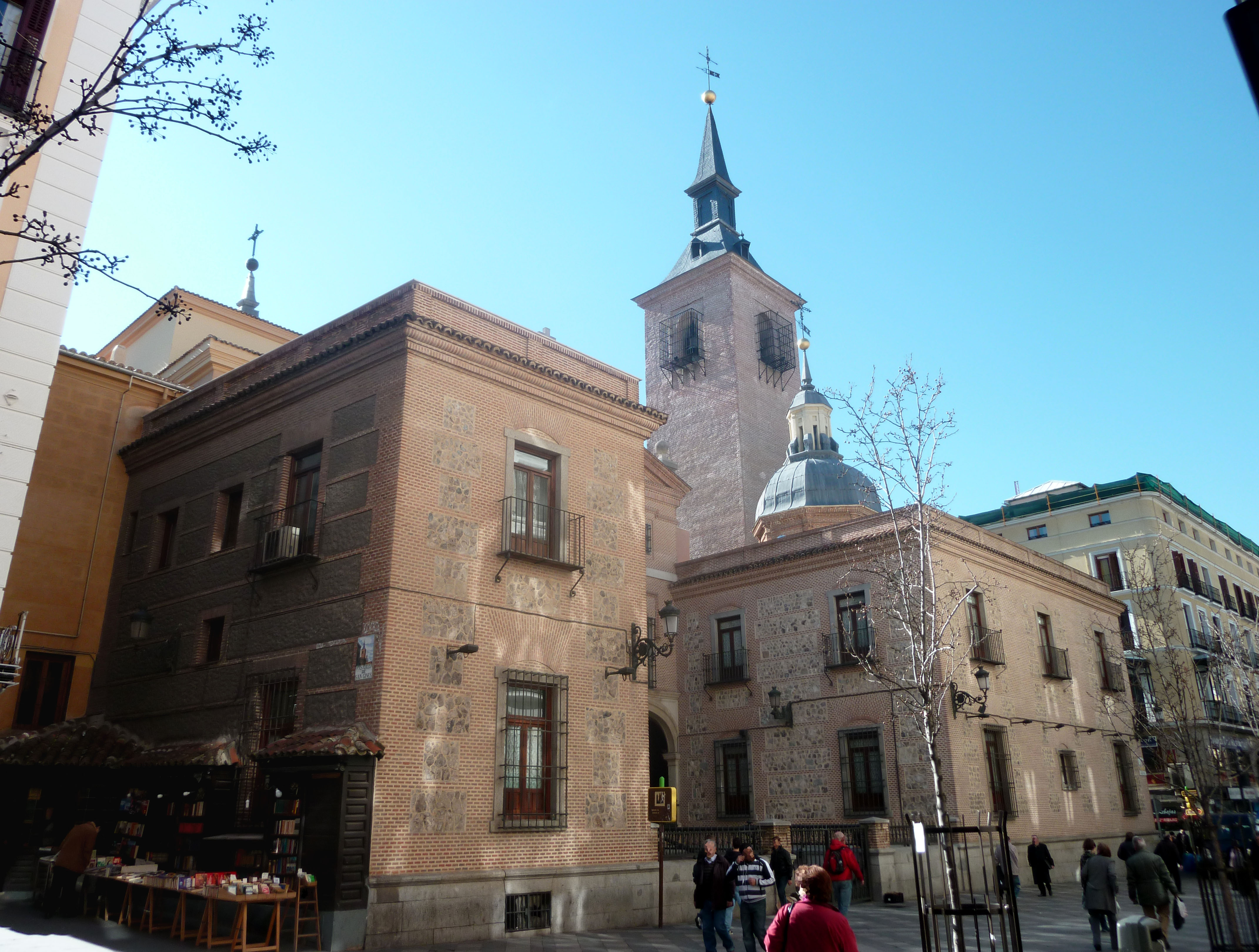
San Ginés, Madrid

In the very early 1900s Ruiz Muñoz was among teaching staff of the Málaga seminary, noted as “elocuente orador sagrado” and “Profesor del Seminario de aquella capital”. Apart from oratorical skills, he was also appreciated for his writings, which apparently mattered when in 1903 he applied for the post of a canon by the Málaga cathedral. He lost to a counter-candidate, even though the press claimed the front-runner was unable to produce “disertaciones cual efectuadas por D. Emilio Ruiz Muñóz”.

Since 1904 he was noted as travelling on unspecified duties to Madrid.

Since 1905 Ruiz Muñoz has been mentioned as delivering sermons in the capital, particularly often in 1907–1909. His exact ecclesiastic position is unclear; it seems unlikely that he served as a vicar or a resident in any particular parish, since he is noted speaking in a number of temples. He appeared usually in St. Ginés, consistently noted almost every year between 1905 and 1912. Other churches or chapels where he served most frequently were Cristo de la Salud and Buen Suceso. He was taking part in Eucharistic Congresses in Metz (1907) and in Madrid (1911). He appeared speaking also at meetings of lay Catholic organizations like Asociación Visita Josefina. In 1912 he served as director espiritual of the Cardenal Cisneros college in Madrid.

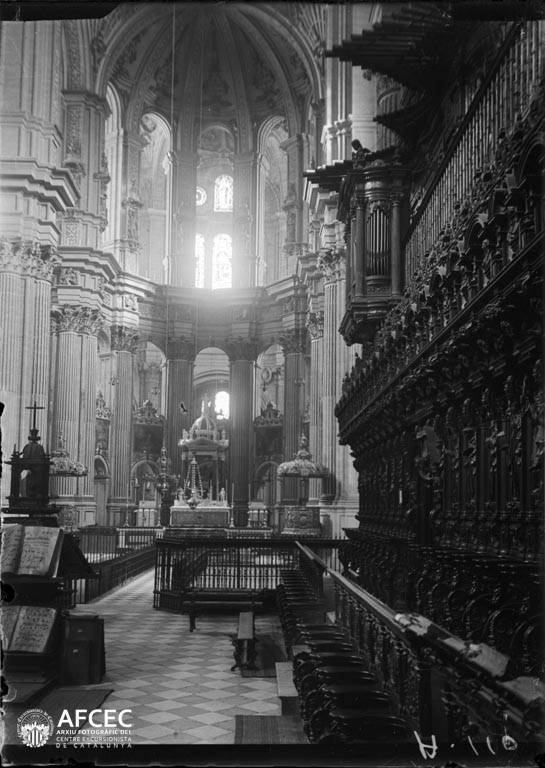
Malaga cathedral

In 1913 Ruiz Muñoz again applied for the vacant canonjía by the Málaga cathedral and emerged successful; he was nominated to the post of canónigo archivero. Little is known of his seven-year-long spell in Málaga. At times he was noted as delivering sermons or taking part in local Catholic events; he also resumed teaching duties at his alma mater, in 1916 recorded as Catedrático de Historia eclesiástica en el Seminario Conciliar. At the time he was heavily engaged in the Madrid-based daily El Siglo Futuro. At an unspecified time the papal nuncio Francesco Ragonesi “por orden a miento de Su Santidad” took an exceptional decision and allowed Ruiz Muñoz to move back to Madrid to continue with editorial tasks while retaining his official canon position in Málaga.

Since 1920 Ruiz Muñoz was back in Madrid. He was fairly seldom noted as delivering sermons in various churches (this time no particular temple prevailing) and during feasts, funerals or weddings. He kept attending religious conferences, e.g. the one organized by Acción Católica in Cáceres (1924) or Asamblea Nacional del Clero in Jaca (1926). In 1927 he was for the first time listed among “capellanes de honor” by the royal chapel, and would consistently appear as “capellán real” of Alfonso XIII. In the early 1930s he was routinely delivering lectures in apologetics to Juventud Católica Femenina de Estudiantes. He remained membership of the Málaga cabildo catedral and one of its 11 canónigos; he was last mentioned in this role in 1932. In Madrid he was most often noted as related to the Buen Suceso church. In 1935 he was to take care of religious issues in Residencia de Estudiantes, a planned Catholic establishment for university students.

== El Siglo Futuro ==
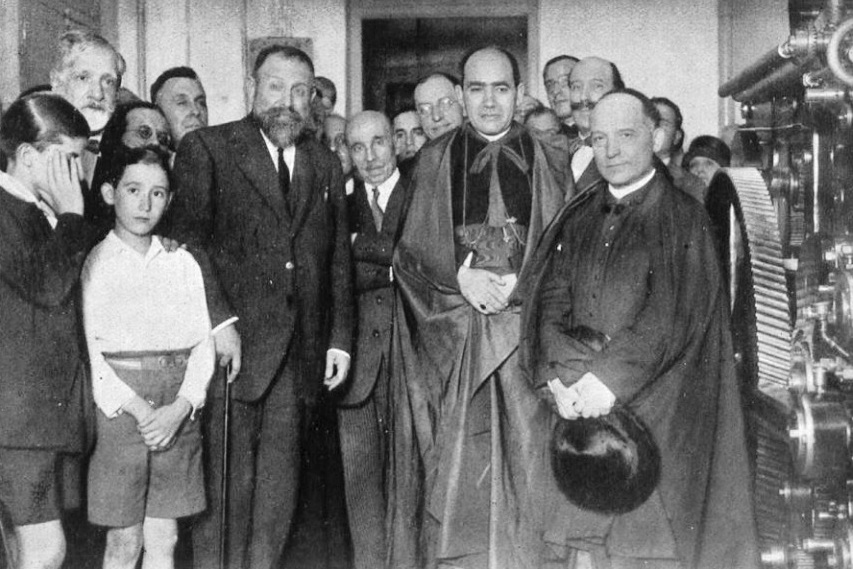
In ESF premises, 1928

In the mid-1900s, Ruiz Muñoz established links with El Siglo Futuro, a Madrid-based Integrist daily; though of rather limited circulation, it remained very popular among the parish clergy. His father and his uncle were both subscribers, while Muñoz Reina remained on somewhat closer terms with the editorial board. Ruiz Muñoz adopted the pen-name "Fabio"; his first identified contributions come from 1906 and are erudite literary reviews, ironic towards liberal writers. In 1907 he started to publish also brief sarcastic pieces commenting articles in liberal newspapers; in this case, he used another pen-name, "Cabellero de las Calzas Prietas". While as “Caballero” he published only 14 notes, the last one dated 1916. As "Fabio" he would continue to write for 30 years. In total as such he published almost 3,000 pieces: on average 35 every year during the Restoration era, 170 during the dictatorship, and 200 during the Second Republic. Under his own surname Ruiz Muñoz printed almost nothing.

The exact official position of Ruiz Muñoz in El Siglo Futuro remains unclear. If referred to on its pages, he usually appeared as “nuestro redactor” or simply as “nuestro Fabio”. In 1912 the newspaper itself acknowledged him as “representante en Málaga de El Siglo Futuro”, but he did not appear in this role after 1920. Another press title in 1925 named him “redactor jefe”, editor-in-chief, the position second only to director Manuel Senante, yet this was entirely exceptional. One present-day historian lists Ruiz Muñoz as merely one of some ten key “colaboradores”, but another one in a monograph, dedicated to the newspaper in the Republican era, features him as the second most often mentioned personality, referred on 68 pages and only after the director. Some sources claim he was “encargado de la sección sociológica” of El Siglo. It is not clear whether Ruiz Muñoz was on the payroll. Regardless of his formal role, there seems to be an agreement that since the mid-1920s Ruiz Muñoz was among key figures in the editorial team.

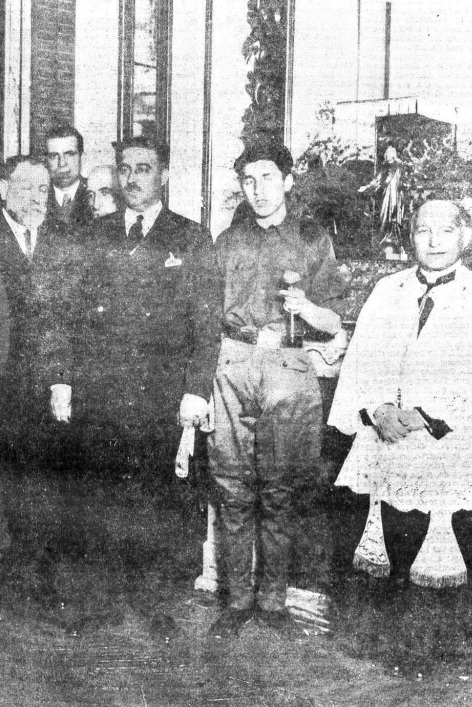
In ESF premises, 1935

Articles of Ruiz Muñoz were usually printed on the front page. In general, they were formatted as commentary on current events, usually written from a religious perspective. In detail the topics discussed could have varied greatly, from politics to political theory, religion, social issues, history, culture and even grammar. Their characteristic feature, typical for Integrist profile of El Siglo Futuro, was absolute Catholic intransigence, presented as the only proper, pope-approved form of religiosity, and refusal to accept so-called malmenorismo. In the 1910s this intransigence was competitive versus conservative and especially liberal Catholicism; in the 1920s his primary targets were emerging Christian-democratic groupings; in the 1930s the negative point of reference—apart from radical left-wing currents, considered in apocalyptic terms—was accidentalist Christianity advanced by CEDA or abroad. Except during the mid-1920s, when Ruiz Muñoz hailed “espada providencial de Primo de Rivera”, this translated into hostility towards all subsequent political regimes.

== Other activities ==
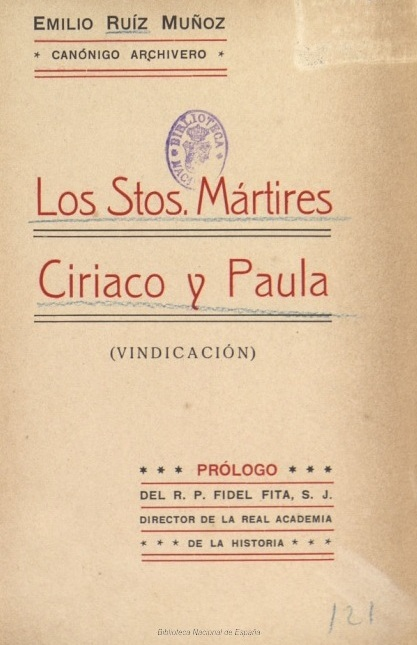
Los Stos. Mártires...

In 1912 Ruiz Muño translated from Latin a liturgical manual, the work officially approved for usage by the Spanish hierarchy. In 1913 as "Fabio" he released two theatrical dramas, both revolving around religious topics and set in ancient Rome: Fabiola and Santa Cecilia; it is not known whether either of them has been actually staged. In 1916 in Málaga he published a 150-page hagiographic booklet Los Stos. Mártires Ciriaco y Paula, prologued by Fidel Fita, followed by a 92-page treaty in 1921 on the role of a woman (collection of some of his earlier lectures), and in 1923 by a 129-page historiographic work El comunismo y los primeros cristianos (earlier serialized in El Siglo). Another selection of earlier articles, Polémica sociológica, was released in 1927. His last stand-alone work was a 31-page pamphlet Las dos legitimidades de la potestad civil, a historiosophic treaty indirectly but clearly aimed against the political regime of the Second Republic.

Apart from El Siglo Futuro Ruiz Muñoz was marginally related to other periodicals. In 1915 in Málaga he founded a religious bulletin titled Pan de Rosario and directed it for a while; its declared purpose was cultivation of "tres bienes espirituales (Rosario, Eucaristía, Doctrina) y uno temporal (el pan del cuerpo)”. In 1933 the periodical was still being issued; as no copy survived, it is unclear whether there were any of his contributions. In the very early 1930s he sent some pieces to the post-Integrist Pamplona title La Tradición Navarra, “cuyos textos eran muy destacados”. In 1932 and invited by Eugenio Vegas Latapié, earlier impressed by his writings, Ruiz Muñoz penned 13 erudite articles to the intellectual monarchist monthly Acción Española. Some of them were massive; since Manuel Senante as the El Siglo Futuro director did not agree to him using the pen-name "Fabio", in Acción Española he was signing as "Javier Reina". In 1932 he contributed a treaty on The Protocols of the Elders of Zion to Las sectas, a tri-monthly issued by Juan Tusquets.

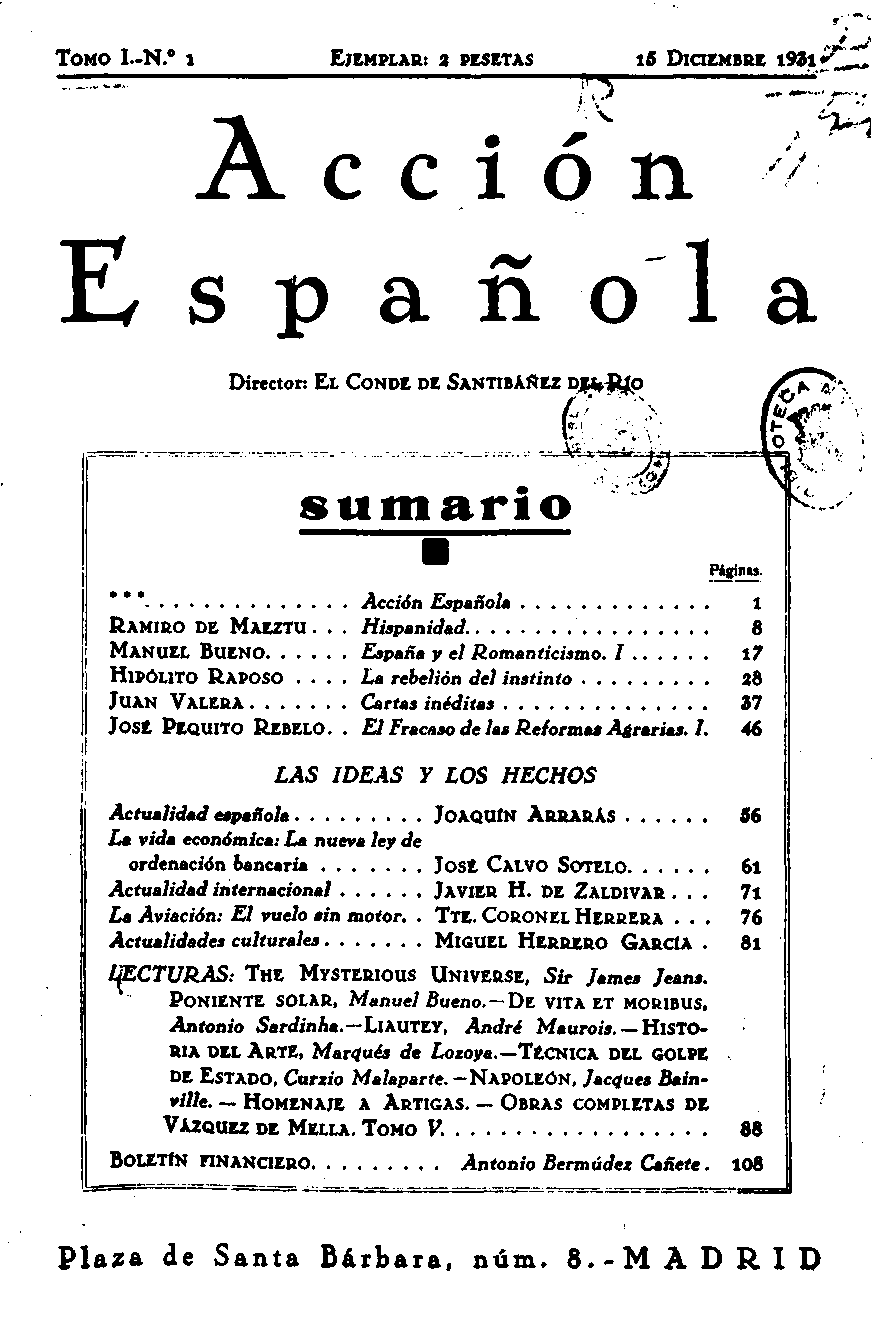
Acción Española

During his second spell in Málaga Ruiz Muñoz was engaged in amateur archeological research, tracing signs of Christianity in the city left during the ancient and the Visigothic periods. In 1916 and 1917 his friend Fidel Fita published in Boletín de la Real Académia de la Historia a few articles dedicated to stone inscriptions in Malaga and explicitly referred Ruiz Muñoz as the one who greatly contributed to the research. The Academia then applauded as “erudita vindicación sobre los santos mártires” his work on St. Cyriacus and St. Paula, and the same year Ruiz Muñoz was admitted as academico correspondiente to the Real Academia de la Historia. He kept appearing as such in later listings, published by the academy, though no further contributions are known. He was marginally involved in some religion-flavoured controversies as to organisation of public space in Málaga. In 1919 he was among co-founders of Comisión Provincial de Monumentos Históricos y Artísticos de Málaga.

== Traditionalist: from Integrist to Carlist ==
Carlist standard

Ruiz Muñoz inherited his political outlook from his father and maternal uncle; both supported Integrism, the branch of Traditionalism which seceded from Carlism in the late 1880s. It was in 1895 that Ruiz Muñoz got first noted as related; in the wake of the Integrist assembly in Valladolid he was among the Málaga co-signatories of a declaration of adherence. He signed similar letters, e.g. in 1901 in support of Felix Sarda Salvany and his Liberalismo es pecado, the most recognized lecture of Integrist outlook. He was first known to have taken part in a party rally in Málaga in 1912. In 1913 he was consejero of Juventud Integrista de Málaga and continued in this role for a few years to come.

When back in Madrid in the 1920s Ruiz Muñoz was not noted as engaged in Integrist structures, especially as Primo de Rivera had suspended all party politics. There was some political flavour in his acceptance of the “capellán real” position at the court of Alfonso XIII, yet one source claims his relations with the royal entourage remained somewhat thorny and in the late 1920s he refused to give a sermon in the royal chapel, reportedly because he disagreed “con la política que se seguía”. In 1930 the end of the dictatorship marked resurrection of parties, and at the time—though not holding any formal position and only thanks to his standing as the El Siglo Futuro pundit—he was considered one of “prohombres del integrismo”.

In 1931–1932 the Integrist leader Juan Olazabál led the party to re-integration with Carlism. It is not known whether Ruiz Muñoz was enthusiastic or skeptical about the merger, especially that El Siglo Futuro became the unofficial mouthpiece of the united party, Comunión Tradicionalista. However, he followed suit. In 1933 Ruiz Muñoz was noted as lecturing at meetings of various Carlist branches, e.g. Sección Femenina Tradicionalista in Madrid. In 1934 the claimant Alfonso Carlos nominated him to Consejo de Cultura Tradicionalista, a body supposed to act as authority on Traditionalist doctrine. Though often absent in party events and rallies, at times he did take part, e.g. in 1935 he blessed the newly-opened premises of Sección de Prensa of Secretariado Tradicionalista at the Madrid Calle del Clavel.

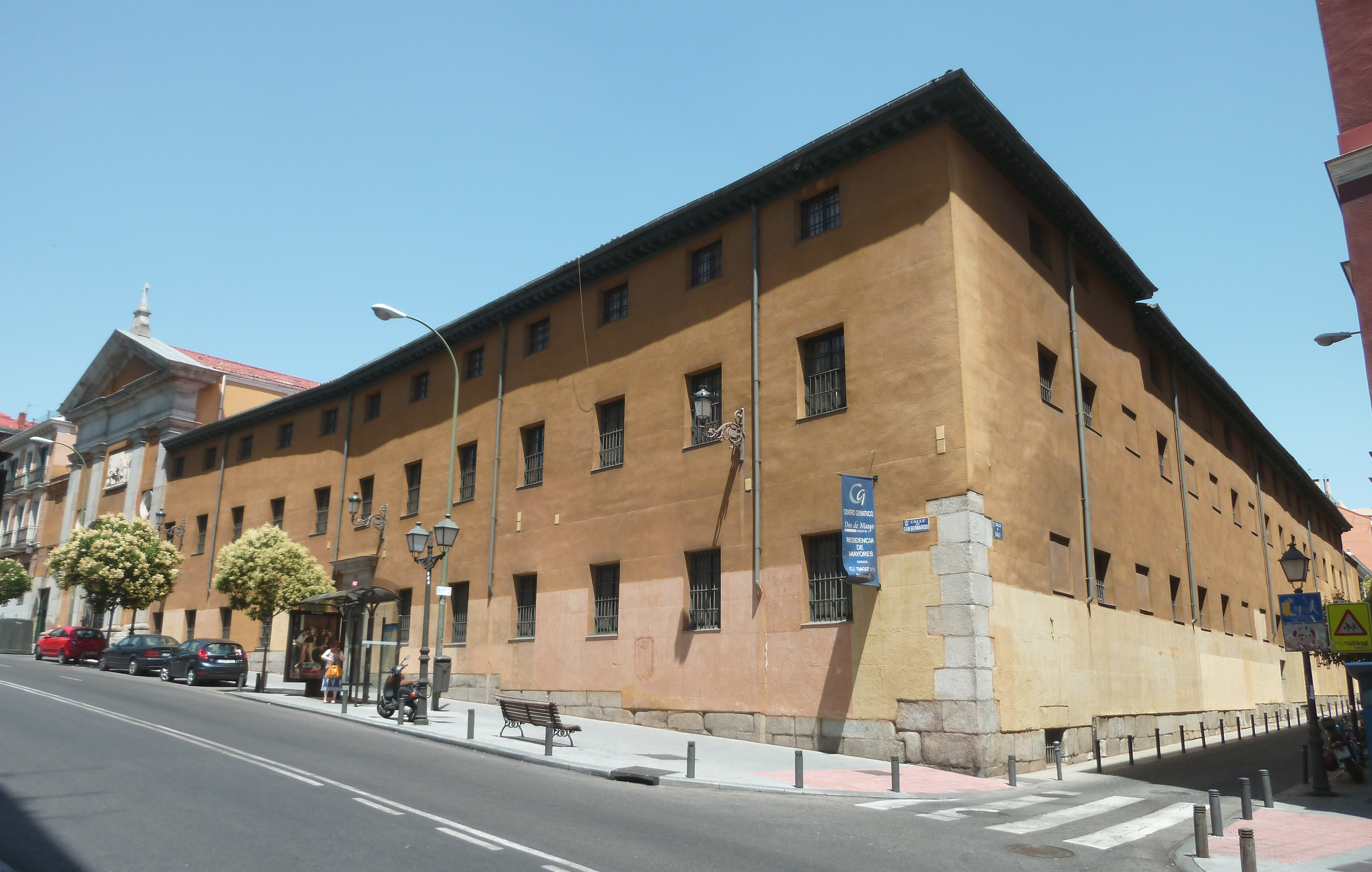
Checa de San Bernardo

Though in articles he advanced a hardly veiled conclusion that the Republic was an illegitimate regime, there is no indication that he was involved in anti-republican conspiracy. At the time of the July 1936 coup he was in Madrid and afterwards he reportedly rejected family advice to go into hiding. In early September he was detained in his rented apartment at calle Vallehermoso by a CNT-FAI squad of CPIP and led to a nearby detention centre known as Checa de San Bernardo; since then his fate is unclear. Some sources suggest he was killed the same day. Other sources claim he was tortured, had his feet and tongue cut off, during the next few days moving on his knees yet kept saying mass every day, and was later killed.

== Reception and in historiography ==
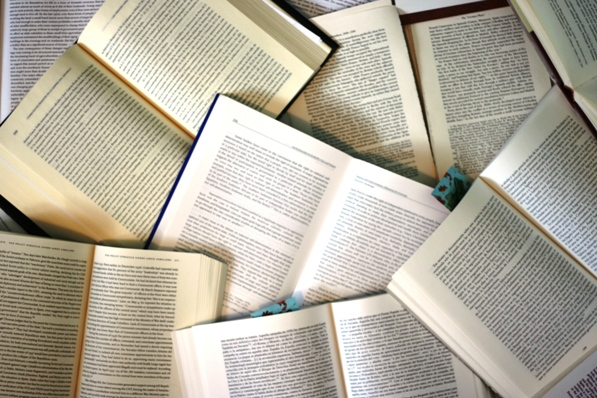

Though in the early 1920s Fabio emerged as an authority in intransigent ultra-right Catholic circles, this segment of society was rather limited. Seldom were his articles re-published by some diaries and he remained ignored by popular Catholic papers like El Debate. Periodicals associated with social-Christian groupings, like Renovación Social, at times might have bothered to publish polemical articles, e.g. in 1926. Some republican papers demonized him, as in 1927 it was claimed that Gabriel Miró was not awarded Premio Fastenrath so that “Father Herrera, Father Minguijón, Father Fabio, Father Chafarote would not get angry”. However, later republican newspapers considered him a sort of caveman, e.g. in 1930 El Heraldo de Madrid counted him among “equizofrenicos y paranoicos” from “manicomio de la calle del Clavel”; in 1932 Luz mocked him as “melancólica flor cavernaria”. Nevertheless, some opponents took him seriously; Ortega y Gasset considered “Javier Reina” a dangerously influential enemy of liberty. Among the radical Right he was thought an authority, be it in Renovación or among the Carlists; Fal Conde suggested that Juan Marín del Campo write his “biografía apologética”.

Except some post-war collective Carlist obituaries of “victimas del furor sectario” who died for Traditionalist ideals, and a 100-metre-long street in Bentarique (named "Canónigo Ruiz Muñoz" already in the 1920s, renamed to honor Fernando de los Ríos in the republican era and renamed again during Francoism), after the war the name Ruiz Muñoz mostly went into oblivion, by some noted merely as “otro mártir ignorado”. Traditionalist media barely re-claimed him, while Partido Carlista propagandists declared him a false Carlist. In present-day historiography he is noted almost exclusively due to his publications in El Siglo Futuro, counted among "uno de los colaboradores más importantes dentro del discurso desplegado por el diario tradicionalista", among Traditionalist intellectuals or "figuras intelectuales más destacadas del partido [carlista]", though in a monographic work on Carlism and the Church he is almost ignored.

Out of his press opus there are two threads which receive most attention. One is the 1920s onslaught against the nascent Christian Democracy, be it in case of Aznar or Arboleya. Another is the 1930s campaign against freemasonry and Judaism, considered “el enemigo judeo-marxista-masónico”. Though profoundly anti-racist and commenting (with regard to Hitler) that “nobody but a lunatic could believe himself a member of a master race”, he advanced the thesis of world Jewry conspiring to destroy Christian civilization, principally by means of freemasonry, and saw the Second Republic as its sinister product. This is how he interpreted secular republican legislation, e.g. with regard to religious orders or Catholic schools. Some authors see his writings as an effort to modernize “antijudaísmo tradicionalista español” by absorbing new threads, e.g. the one of judeo-bolshevik conspiracy. One scholar claims that Ruiz Muñoz instigated violence, since his theoretical reflections on the illegitimate nature of the Second Republic “seemed to imply the right to take up arms against a regime”. The author of a 2023 scientific monograph on El Siglo Futuro ends his work by ridiculing Ruiz Muñoz.

== See also ==
- Traditionalism (Spain)
- Carlism
- Integrism (Spain)
- El Siglo Futuro
- wartime repression of Spanish clergy

== Footnotes ==
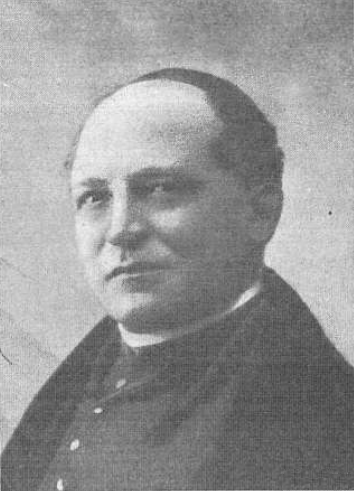
Ruiz Muñoz, probably in his 40s (in 1910s?)
