= Eduardo Torres (organist) =

Spanish organist and composer

Eduardo Torres (1872–1934) was a Spanish organist and a composer for organ and harmonium.

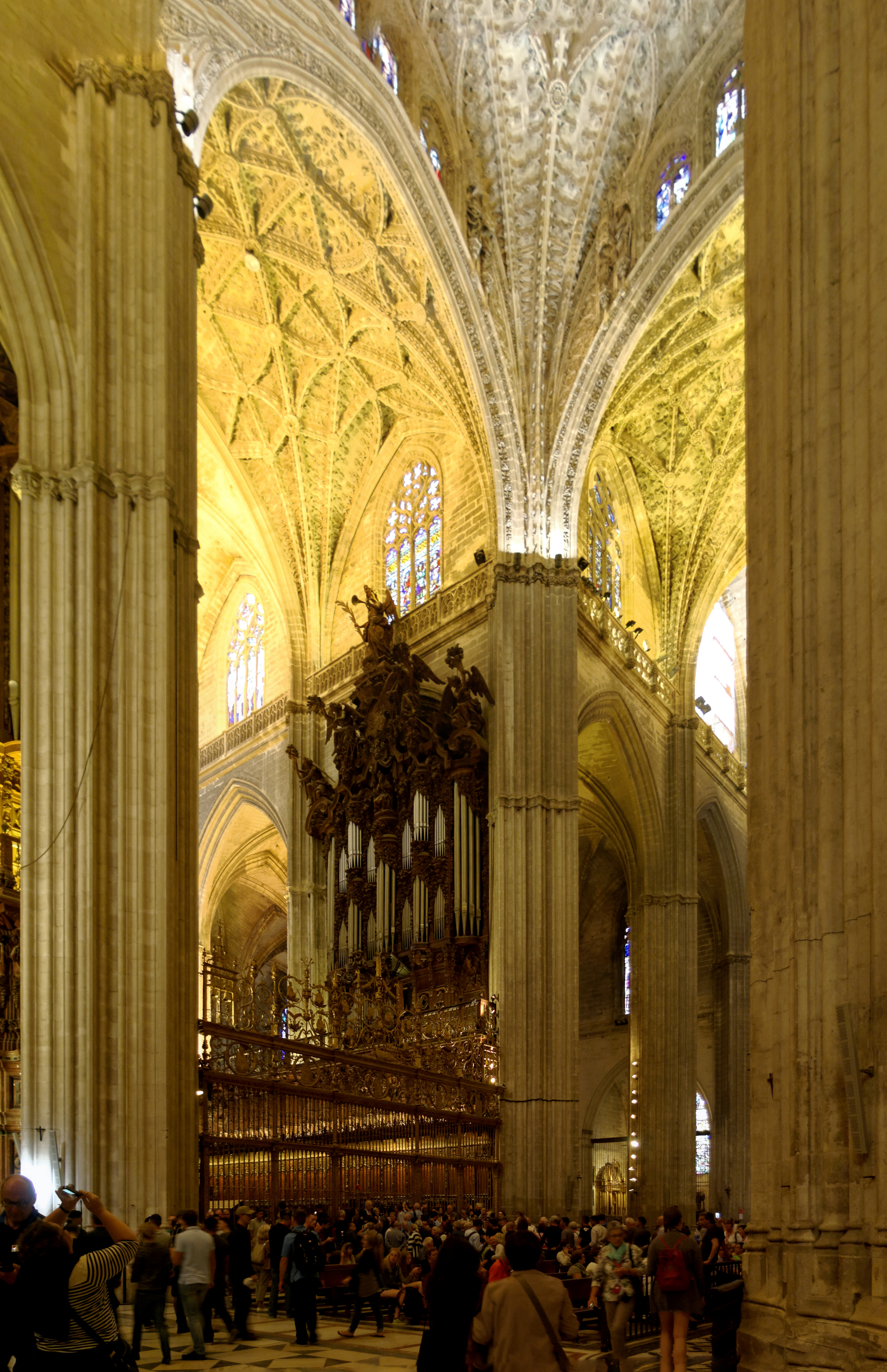
Interior of the Seville Cathedral, showing the pipes of the organ played by Eduardo Torres.

Torres was a Roman Catholic priest, who was choirmaster at Seville Cathedral (the third-largest church in the world).

== Life ==
Torres was born in Albaida, Valencia, and studied under Giner. In 1895, he became a choirmaster in Tortosa. He moved to Seville in 1910, and remained there until his death in 1934. During this time, he composed prolifically. He was also involved with two orchestras in Seville: he founded the city's Orquesta Sinfónica, which only had a short existence, and he directed the Orquesta Bética de Cámera.

== Music ==
His most well-known work is his Saetas, a collection of organ pieces based on Andalusian folk songs. Of his other output, both Motetes al Sagrado Corazón de Jesús, and Ofertorio y plegaria were singled out as "outstanding" by music historian Tomás Marco.

== Recordings and reviews ==
Torres' music, while not widely known today, has been played on several classical music compact discs. His Saeta number four was reviewed by Gramophone. His Berceuse was played at Adlington Hall, in Macclesfield, Cheshire, and was added to the CD of organ music by organist Anne Page. Esteban Elizondo-Iriarte also played Berceuse for his CD of organ music at played at St. Peter's church, in Bergara, Spain.
