= Gloria Giner de los Ríos García =

Spanish teacher

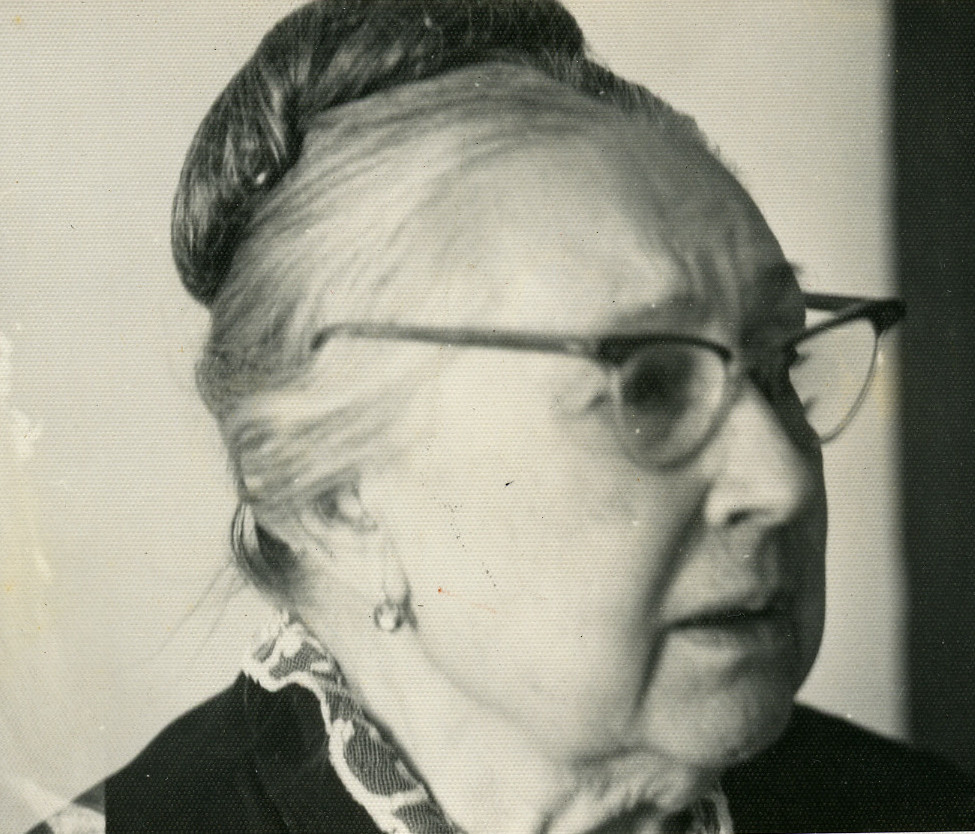
- Born: 28 March 1886; Madrid, Spain
- Died: 6 February 1970 (aged 83); Madrid, Spain
- Resting place: Civil Cemetery of Madrid
- Occupation: Teacher
- Spouse: Fernando de los Ríos
- Children: Laura de los Ríos Giner
- Parents: Hermenegildo Giner de los Ríos (father); Laura García Hoppe (mother)

Gloria Giner de los Ríos García (28 March 1886 – 6 February 1970) was a Spanish teacher at the Escuela Normal Superior de Maestras and the Institución Libre de Enseñanza. The author of innovative manuals dedicated to the teaching of history and geography, she, together with Leonor Serrano Pablo, developed the educational "recipe" that they called "enthusiastic observation". They also worked to change the androcentric canon of geographical studies to include women.

She lived in exile during the Francoist Spain era, forming part of the intellectual elite that carried out educational, philological, literary, legal, and cultural work. Her family had close connections to that of poet Federico García Lorca.

== Biography ==
Gloria Giner de los Ríos García was born in Madrid on 28 March 1886. The daughter of Laura García Hoppe and Hermenegildo Giner de los Ríos, she spent her childhood and adolescence in Madrid, Alicante, and Barcelona, cities where her father held the Chair of Philosophy. After finishing high school in 1906 and teaching in 1908, she completed her training by attending classes at the Institución Libre de Enseñanza and taking courses in art, pedagogy, and philosophy. In 1909, she was promoted to the Escuela de Estudios Superiores de Magisterio.

=== Marriage, family, and social life ===
On 1 July 1912, Giner married Fernando de los Ríos, who had obtained the Chair of Law at the University of Granada. It was in this city that the couple took up residence, and in which Gloria was a teacher at the Normal School, by right of consort at first, and later in her own position. A year later, their daughter Laura de los Ríos Giner was born. In Granada, the Ríos Giner family became friends with the García Lorca family, with Manuel de Falla, and with Berta Wilhelmi and her husband Eduardo Domínguez. Wilhelmi had been in contact with the Institución Libre de Enseñanza and had organized some community schools in Almuñécar. With her collaboration, Giner organized the education of her daughter Laura and other children, including Isabel García Lorca, in order to separate them from Granada's private education system.

=== Laura de los Ríos and Isabel García Lorca ===
Federico García Lorca was one of the select circle of friends of the Ríos family. He dedicated the poem Romance sonámbulo to Fernando and Gloria, and was the one who introduced their daughters, Laura de los Ríos and Isabel García Lorca. The friendship between the latter was very intense and lasting. They became sisters-in-law when Laura married Federico's younger brother Francisco. In an interview, Isabel Garcia Lorca recalled:

Gloria Giner was an extraordinary being. Well, of character, I think there was a certain similarity in all of them, some high moral tension. People a little demanding with what others did and what they could do. They were like that down deep, including my mother.

Laura, in another interview, told of her mother's life in Granada:

My mother attended her classes every day...in the afternoon she prepared her classes and helped my father. She translated from German, the language my father and a German teacher in Granada had taught her. She also translated from French, which she knew very well, from Greek and Latin...lovingly and intellectually my parents were a very well-matched marriage.

== Professional career ==
In 1931, the Provisional Government of the Republic appointed her husband Minister of Justice, and in December, Minister of Public Instruction. Giner told her daughter, "I'm not going to give up my career and live as a minister." Nonetheless, she performed some ceremonial functions and accompanied her husband on trips through Spain. In 1932 she was on leave as a teacher at the Normal School, but continued teaching at the Institución Libre de Enseñanza. In 1933, after her husband resigned from government office, she rejoined teaching by accepting a position in Zamora. For three courses she lived alone in a hotel room three days a week, returning to Madrid for the rest of the week. In Zamora, as in Granada, society shunned her for being the wife of a socialist and not attending religious services.

== Exile ==
At the end of September 1936, Fernando de los Ríos was appointed ambassador of Spain to the United States, a position he held until March 1939. Gloria Giner moved to Washington, D.C., with her daughter, her mother, and a nephew of her husband. Fernanda Urruti, Fernando's mother, would later join them. In Washington, Giner was invited to several meetings that Eleanor Roosevelt organized in the White House. During the Civil War, Fernando de los Ríos was separated from his professorship at the University of Madrid. In 1939, the Franco government definitively separated him from his chair and dismissed him.

Fernando de los Ríos taught at The New School for Social Research in New York, an institution founded to welcome European intellectuals who emigrated for political reasons. Giner was a professor at Columbia University. The Ríos-Giner family lived in exile in the United States, which did not recognize Spanish Republican exiles and subjected those who wanted to enter to immigration laws. However, university students and artists were exempt from the rigid immigration quota, provided they were endorsed by US citizens or claimed by a university. Gloria was one of the exiled academics who passed through American universities and formed an intellectual elite.

In 1942, her daughter Laura married Francisco García Lorca, younger brother of the poet Federico, in the Mead Chapel of Middlebury College, where both were professors at the Spanish School. The couple had three daughters, and the family lived together in a New York apartment. In addition to preparing classes, writing poems, and working on the publication of her works, Giner took care of her three granddaughters, took them out for walks and, if necessary, took them on the bus and subway in New York.

In 1949, Fernando de los Ríos died. Over 50 personalities of politics and culture attended the funeral. José de los Ríos – the younger brother of Fernando and Francisco García Lorca – presided over the dual family. Fernando's wife, mother, and daughter stayed at the house during the funeral, in accordance with Spanish custom at the time.

== Return to Spain ==
Gloria Giner returned to Spain with her daughter's family in 1965. She died in Madrid on 6 February 1970. She was buried in the Civil Cemetery of Madrid, and her husband's remains were reinterred there alongside hers on 28 June 1980.

== Teaching methods ==
Gloria Giner and her great friend Leonor Serrano Pablo worked together on the teaching of geography in order to connect with students. Giner defended the formative capacity of the plastic arts "as a real basis for the teaching of history in the first years of the formation of the culture of the child". Her 1935 book Cien lecturas históricas became a prominent text for educational reformers inspired by the work of Rafael Altamira.

With Altamira and Maria Montessori as references, they developed didactic methods that, in Serrano's words, revolved around "enthusiastic observation". This consisted of teaching geography in dialogue with the students, strengthening their physical and emotional relationship with the environment. Another component of enthusiastic observation was emotional. Impositions of rote memorization were eliminated. In Giner's words, "the soul was educated and the spirit strengthened".

Serrano and Giner also advocated for the meaningful inclusion of women in the androcentric canon of studies on geography. The Dictionary of the Royal Spanish Academy had, in 1803, included the meaning of the word hombre (man) to refer to all mankind. Taking the term as inclusive of women, they understood that it forced men to relate to nature as women did. Serrano considered that rendering the androcentric references in geography meaningless would foster a "new creative, loving, anti-destructive, and anti-war humanity". In the opinion of professor Ana I. Simón Alegre, this teaching, in the language of the 21st century, could be called the development of environmental education or the first manifestations of ecofeminism.

Giner's last book, Por tierras de España (1962), also incorporated audio-lingual teaching methods.

== Works ==
- Historia de la pedagogía (1910)
- Weimer, Hermann 1872–1942 (translation)
- Geografía Primer grado. Aspectos de la naturaleza y vida del hombre en la tierra (1919)
- Geografía: Primer grado (1919), with Federico Ribas (1890–1952)
- Geografía general. El cielo, la Tierra y el hombre (1935)
- Cien lecturas históricas (1935)
- Lecturas geográficas. Espectáculos de la naturaleza, paisajes, ciudades y hombres (1936)
- Romances de los ríos de España (1943)
- Manual de historia de la civilización española (1951)
- Cumbres de la civilización española: Interpretación del espíritu español individualizado en diecinueve figuras representativas (1955)
- El paisaje de Hispanoamérica a través de su literatura: (antología) (1958)
- Introducción a la historia de la civilización española (1959)
- Por tierras de España (1962), with Luke Nolfi, ISBN 9780030800238
