= Andarax =

River in Spain

Coordinates: 37.0153°N 2.88917°W

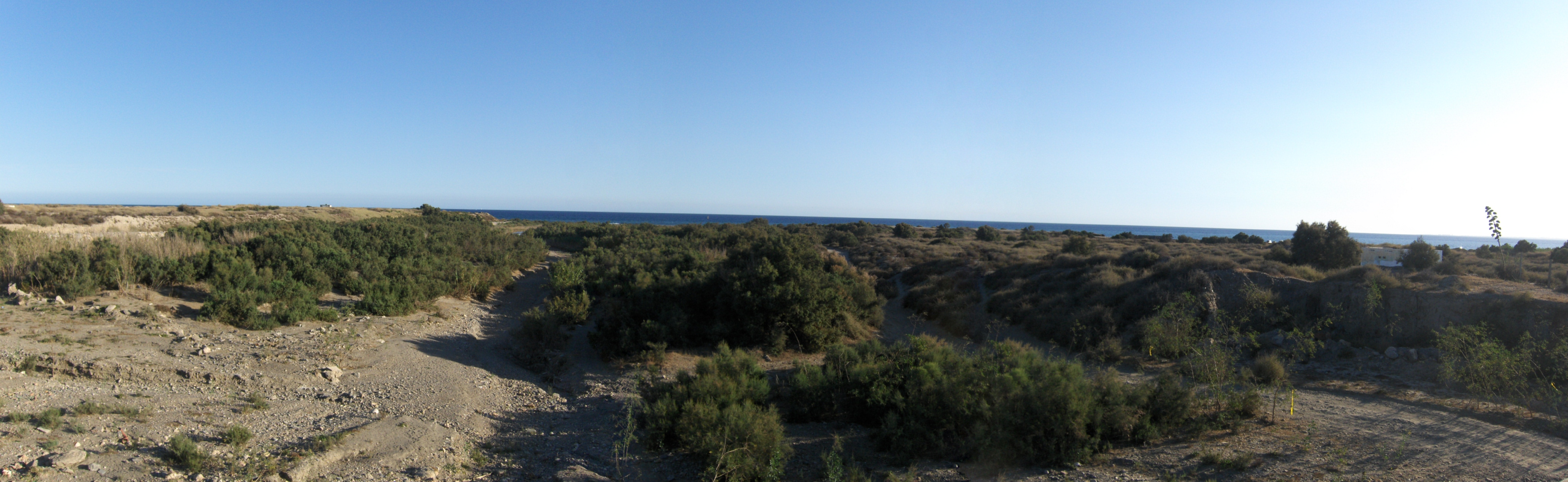
- Mouth of the River Andarax

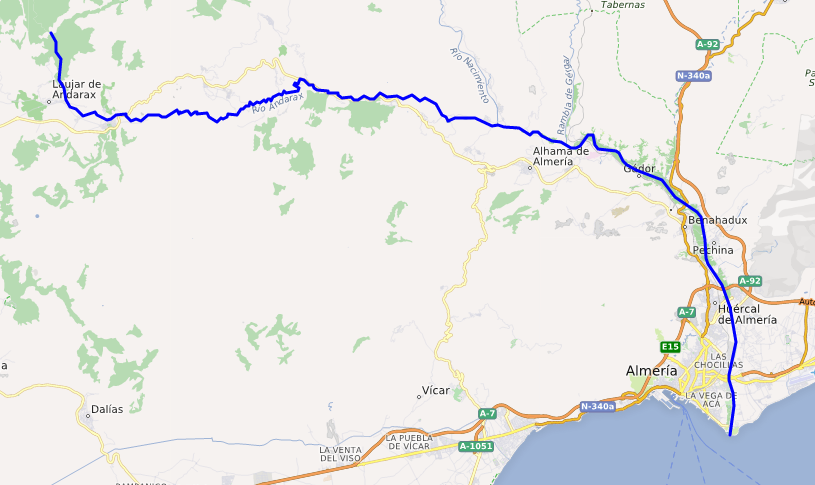

Location
- Country: Spain

Physical characteristics
- Source
  - location: Cerro del Almirez, Almería
  - elevation: 2,509 metres (8,232 ft)
- Mouth
  - location: Mediterranean Sea near Almería
  - elevation: 0 metres (0 ft)
- Length: 67 kilometres (42 mi)

Basin features
- Tributaries
  - left: Barranco de las Navas, Río Chico Rambla de Tices
  - right: Barranco de Cacín, Barranco del Portugués, Rambla de Arcora

The Andarax (Spanish: río Andarax)—also, in its lower reaches, Almería River or River Almería (Spanish: río Almería)—is a river in the province of Almería, Andalusia, Spain. It arises in the easternmost part of the Sierra Nevada. Its entire course is within the province of Almería. It flows through the Valley of Andarax south of the Sierra Nevada, running eastwards, and joins the River Nacimiento at the village of Terque.

It then turns southwards and passes through the Tabernas Desert, where it receives the intermittent waters of the Rambla de Tabernas, its last significant tributary. It passes through the municipalities of Rioja, Pechina, Viator, and Benahadux, where it waters many citrus orchards. Finally, it reaches the sea on the outskirts of the city of Almería, forming a wide delta.

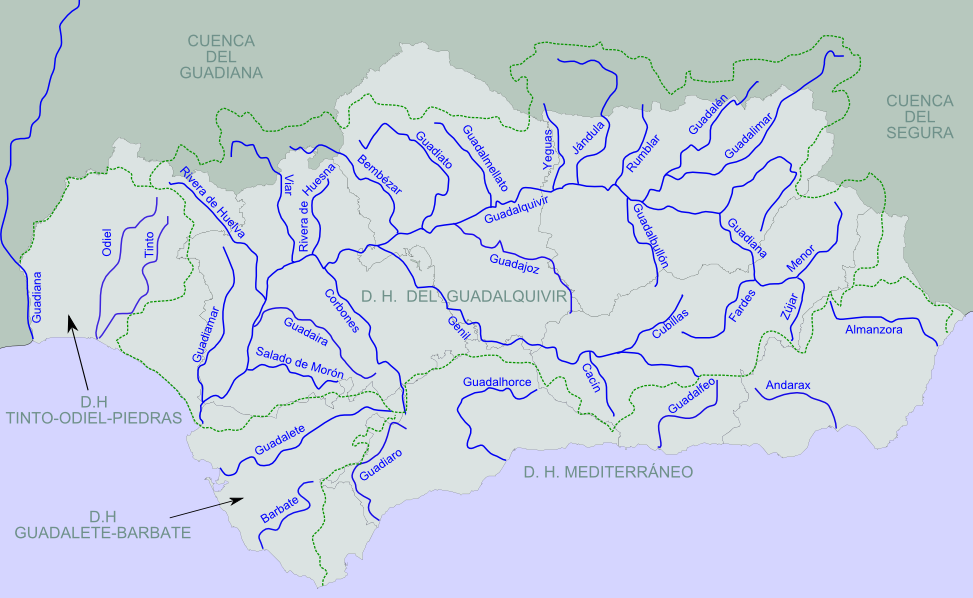
Rivers of Andalusia. The Andarax is second from the right of the rivers reaching the Mediterranean.

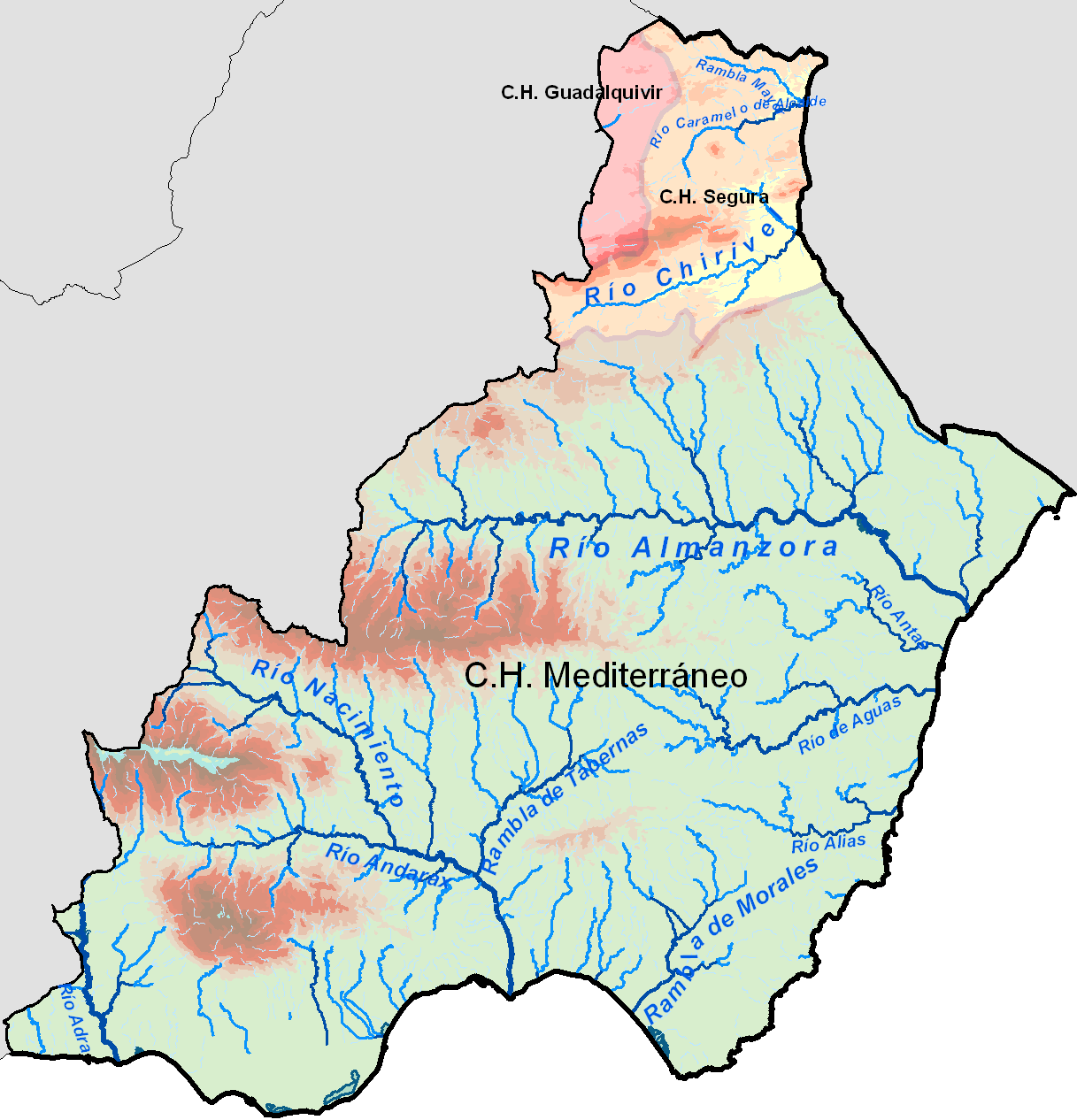
Rivers of Almería. The Andarax is at bottom center.
