= Maximiliano Arboleya =

Spanish sociologist, priest, and activist

Maximiliano Arboleya (1870–1951) was a Spanish sociologist, priest, and activist.

He is counted among pioneers of Spanish Christian-democracy. As such, he attracted heavy criticism from representatives of intransigent Traditionalist Catholicism, like another priest Emilio Ruiz Muñoz.

== See also ==
- Catholic Church in Spain
