= Bentarique =

- Municipality
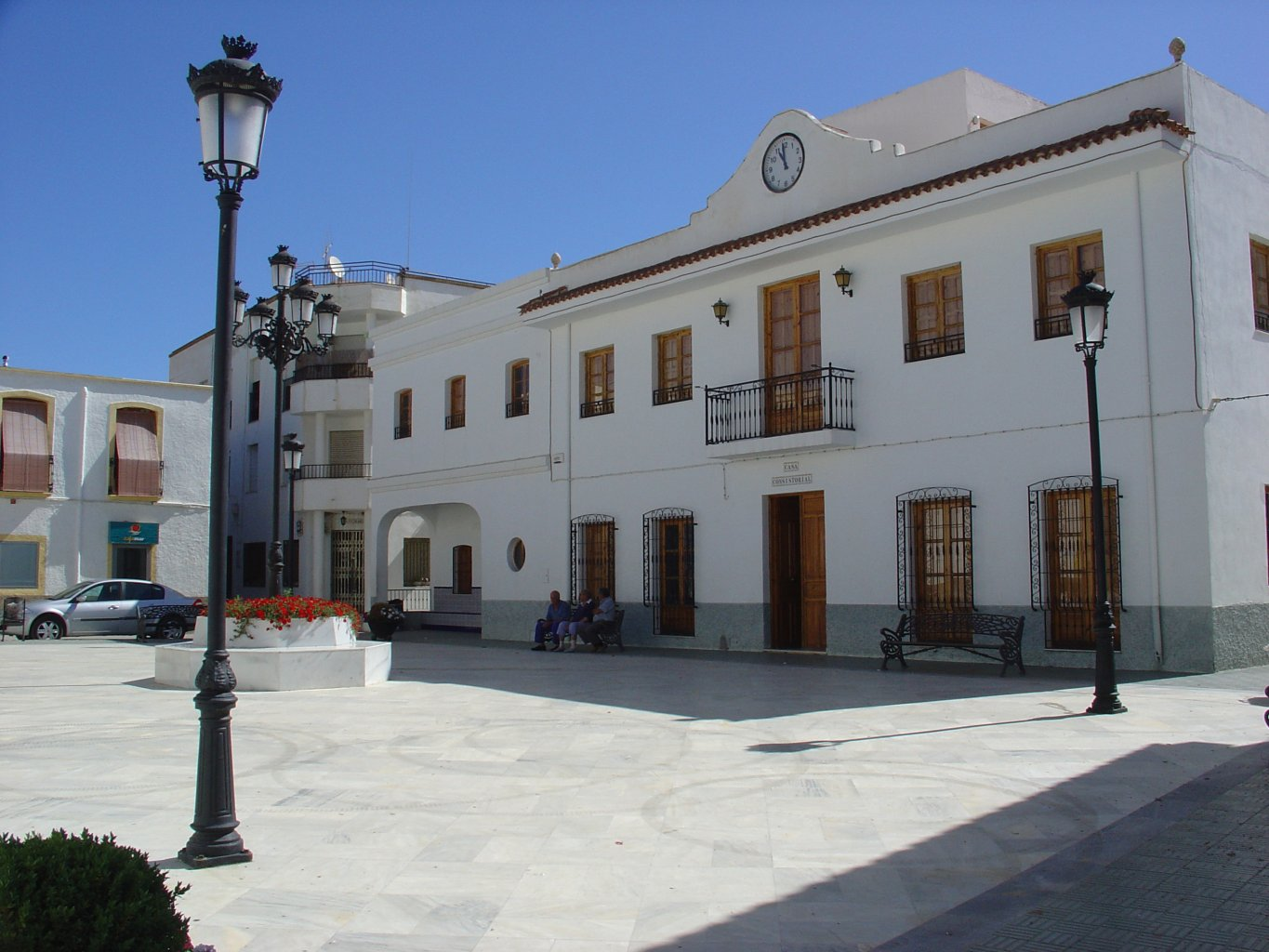
- Town hall

- Flag Seal

- Location within Spain Location within Andalusia Location within Province of Almería
- Coordinates: 36°59′11.4″N 2°37′19.1″W
- Country: Spain
- A. community: Andalucía
- Province: Almería

Government
  - Mayor: Modesto Martínez

Area
  - Total: 11.34 km^{2} (4.38 sq mi)

Population (January 1, 2021)
  - Total: 240
  - Density: 21.16/km^{2} (54.8/sq mi)
- Time zone: UTC+01:00
- Postal code: 04569
- MCN: 04028
- Website: Official website

Bentarique is a municipality of Almería province, in the autonomous community of Andalusia, Spain.

== Demographics ==
Historical population
Year	Pop.	±%
1999	321	—
2000	317	−1.2%
2001	308	−2.8%
2002	298	−3.2%
2003	281	−5.7%
2004	278	−1.1%
2005	275	−1.1%
Source: INE (Spain)

== Notable people ==
- Emilio Ruiz Muñoz (1874-1936), Catholic priest and press commentator

== See also ==
- List of municipalities in Almería
