= Alboloduy =

Alboloduy, Spain
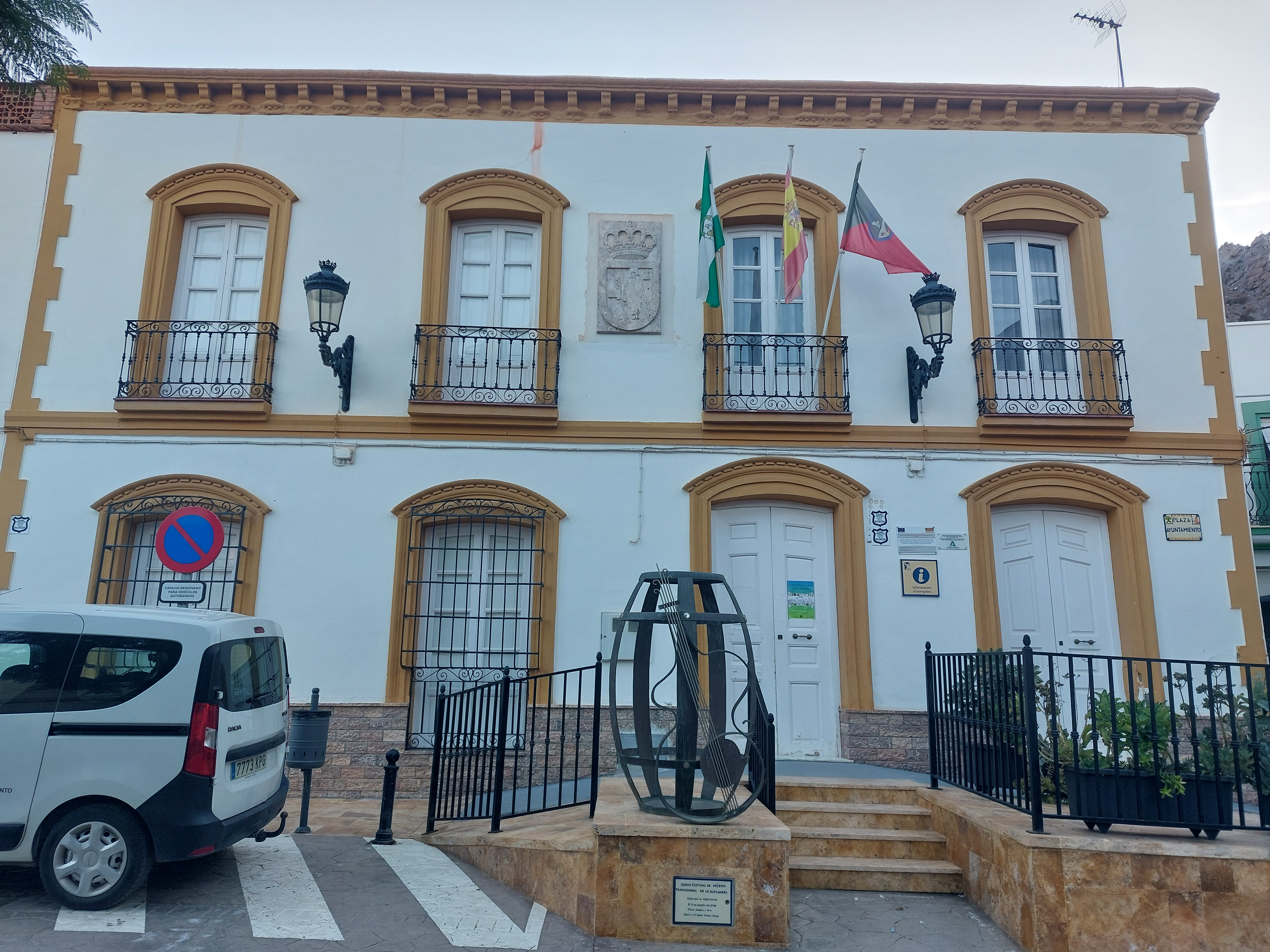
- Town Hall

- Flag Coat of arms

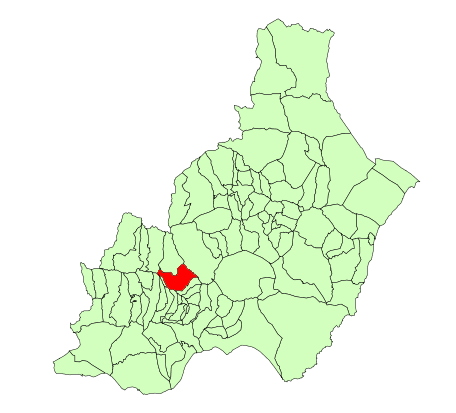
- Coordinates: 37.03346°N 2.62164°W
- Country: Spain
- Community: Andalusia
- Province: Almería

Government
  - Mayor: Sonia María Guil (PP)

Area
  - Total: 70 km^{2} (27 sq mi)
- Elevation: 377 m (1,237 ft)

Population (2025-01-01)
  - Total: 579
  - Density: 8.3/km^{2} (21/sq mi)
- Time zone: UTC+1 (CET)
  - Summer (DST): UTC+2 (CEST)

Alboloduy is a municipality of Almería province, in Spain.

== Demographics ==
Historical population
Year	Pop.	±%
1999	811	—
2000	812	+0.1%
2001	800	−1.5%
2002	765	−4.4%
2003	765	+0.0%
2004	764	−0.1%
2005	745	−2.5%
2006	727	−2.4%
2007	728	+0.1%
2008	703	−3.4%
2009	674	−4.1%
2010	667	−1.0%
2011	698	+4.6%
2012	674	−3.4%
2013	645	−4.3%
2014	642	−0.5%
2015	653	+1.7%
2016	613	−6.1%
2017	610	−0.5%
2018	621	+1.8%
2019	616	−0.8%
Source: INE (Spain)

== See also ==
- List of municipalities in Almería
