= Leonor Serrano Pablo =

- Occupation: Jurist

Leonor Serrano Pablo, or Leonor Serrano de Xandri, was a Spanish teacher, lawyer, jurist, and school inspector. She was born on February 22, 1890, in Hinojosas de Calatrava, Spain. She died on April 24, 1942, in Madrid, Spain. She was a feminist who worked towards women having more opportunities in the fields she worked in.

== Contributor to Educational Reform ==
When she was young, Pablo gained a scholarship for the College of the Sacred Heart in Madrid. After this, she gained a spot as a teacher at Escuela Normal in Guadalajara. She then attended the Madrid school Escuela de Estudios Superiores de Magisterio from 1909 to 1912. There she encountered ideas of educational reform from the Institución Libre de Enseñanza. This institution was the first education system in Spain that was not controlled by the state or government. She was hired as a school inspector in 1913 in Barcelona. She was then chosen by Catalan teacher Eladi Homs to attend the Second International Montessori Course. These ideas of educational reform made a significant impact on her, leading to her participation in the implementation of Montessori education in Catalonia. During this time, she advocated to the government for universal access to schooling, especially women. In 1924, she was given a grant to travel Europe to visit schools and spread her educational reform. She visited Germany, France, and Sweden. In 1926, she was exiled from Catalonia for refusing to condemn teachers who use Catalan to teach in schools.

== Law Education and Impacts ==
After Pablo was exiled, she went back to Barcelona and continued her education in law until 1930. She was accepted by the Barcelona Bar Association on October 6, 1930. She then appeared before the Barcelona Court of Appeals, being the first female lawyer of the city as well as the first woman to testify before the court of appeals. She was also made a member of the Barcelona Juvenile Court. She then became one of the first three female members of the First Catalan Legal Congress. She used her power to advocate for women's access to education and women's rights in general.

== Life after the Civil War ==
The Spanish Civil War heavily impacted Pablo. In 1937, she was dismissed from her post of educational inspector by Wenceslao Roces. In 1938, she was dismissed by the Barcelona Bar Association due to failure to submit her fees. Right after this, Francisco Franco's army bombed Barcelona, resulting in the death of her son and husband. She was then exiled to France. In 1939, she illegally returned to Madrid to care for her mother. She was recognized and arrested, leading to her death in prison while court proceedings were happening on 24 April 1941.
