= Ohanes =

Ohanes, Spain
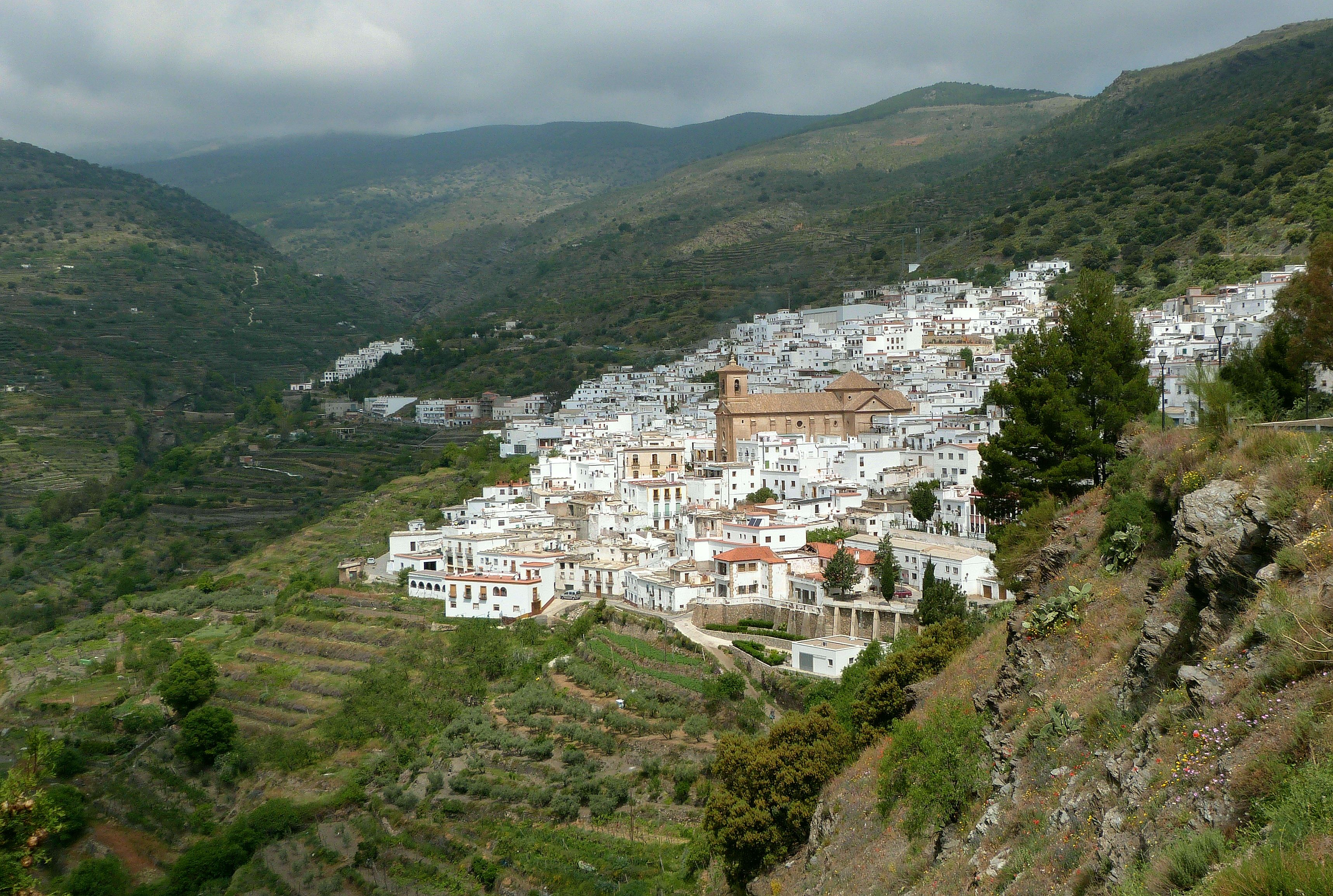

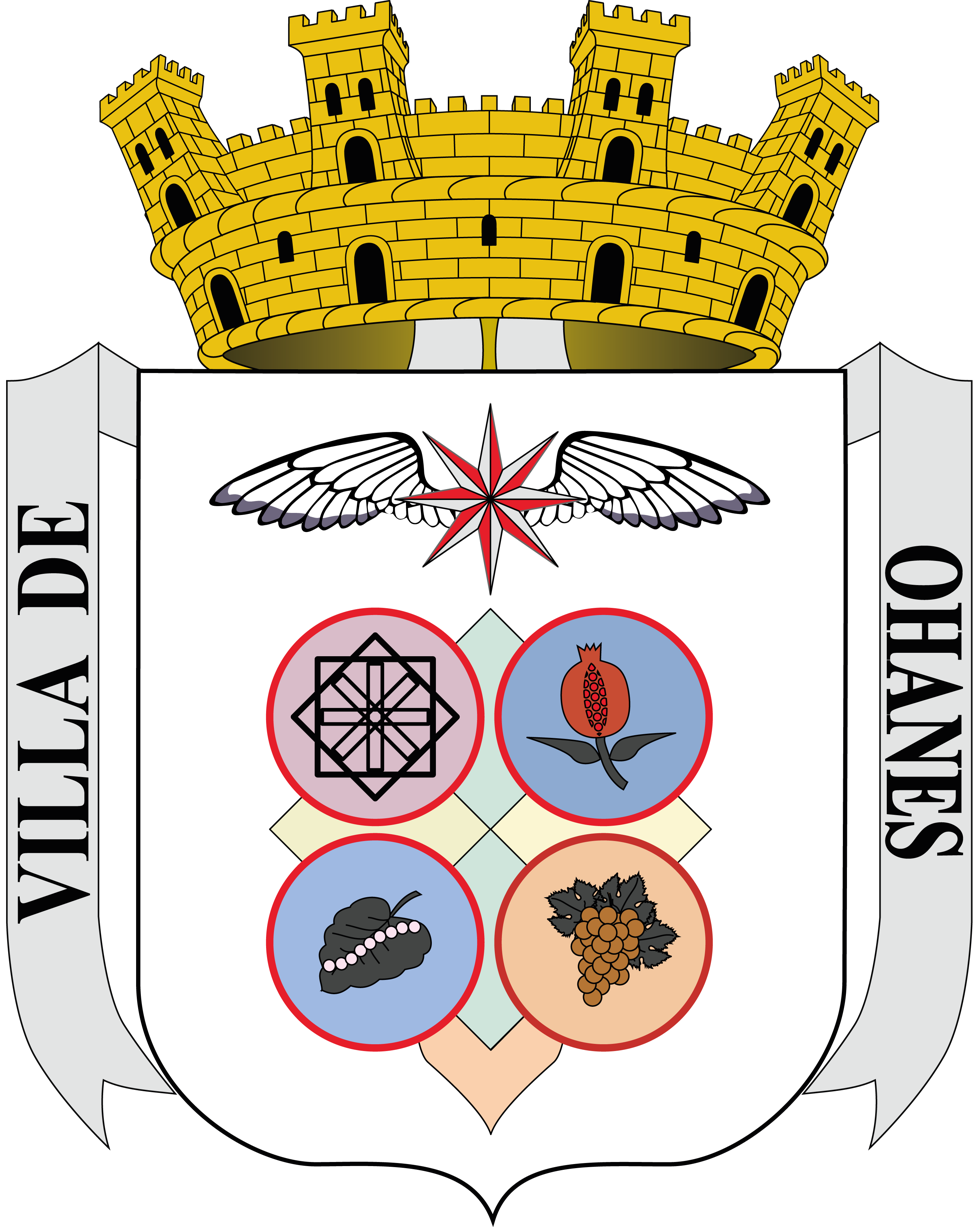
- Coat of arms
- Interactive map of Ohanes, Spain
- Coordinates: 37.0382667°N 2.7452567°W
- Country: Spain
- Community: Andalusia
- Municipality: Almería

Government
  - Mayor: Juan Francisco Sierra Martínez (PSOE)

Area
  - Total: 32 km^{2} (12 sq mi)
- Elevation: 958 m (3,143 ft)

Population (2025-01-01)
  - Total: 553
  - Density: 17/km^{2} (45/sq mi)
- Time zone: UTC+1 (CET)
  - Summer (DST): UTC+2 (CEST)

Ohanes is a municipality of Almería province, in the autonomous community of Andalusia, Spain.

== Demographics ==
Historical population
Year	Pop.	±%
1999	784	—
2000	765	−2.4%
2001	749	−2.1%
2002	766	+2.3%
2003	766	+0.0%
2004	822	+7.3%
2005	795	−3.3%
Source: INE (Spain)

== See also ==
- List of municipalities in Almería
