= Fernando de los Ríos =

Spanish professor and politician (1879–1949)

Fernando de los Ríos Urruti
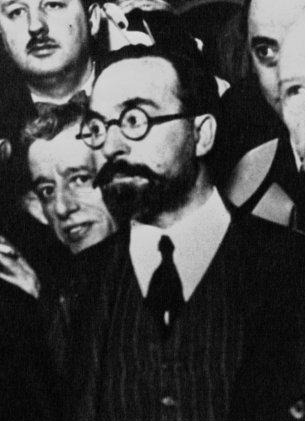

Deputy for Granada
- In office 24 June 1919 – 2 October 1920

Deputy for Madrid
- In office 28 May 1923 – 15 September 1923

National Assembly Representative
- In office 10 October 1927 – 29 October 1927

Deputy for Granada
- In office 7 July 1931 – 2 February 1939

Minister of Justice
- In office 14 April 1931 – 16 December 1931
- Preceded by: Indalecio Prieto
- Succeeded by: Álvaro de Albornoz

Minister of Public Education and Fine Arts
- In office 16 December 1931 – 12 June 1933
- Preceded by: Marcelino Domingo
- Succeeded by: Francisco Barnés Salinas

Minister of State (Foreign Minister)
- In office 12 June 1933 – 12 September 1933
- Preceded by: Luis de Zulueta
- Succeeded by: Claudio Sánchez-Albornoz

Personal details
- Born: 8 December 1879 Ronda, Malaga, Spain
- Died: 31 May 1949 (aged 69) New York City, New York, USA
- Party: PSOE
- Spouse: Gloria Giner de los Ríos García
- Occupation: Politician

Fernando de los Ríos Urruti (8 December 1879 – 31 May 1949) was a Spanish professor of political law and socialist politician who was in turn Minister of Justice, Minister of Education and Foreign Minister between 1931 and 1933. in the early years of the Second Spanish Republic. During the Spanish Civil War (1936–1939), he was Spanish Ambassador to France and then to the United States.

== Early years (1879–1918) ==
Fernando del Río Urruti was born to a prosperous family on 8 December 1879 in Ronda, Málaga. His father, José del Río, (Note: His paternal family used the surnames "de los Ríos" and "del Rio" ("of the Rivers" or "of the River") indifferently.) was an Infantry captain. His mother, Fernanda Urruti, came from a French Basque family. His family owned agricultural properties in Ronda. The paternal side of his family included the moderate politician and government minister Antonio de los Ríos Rosas. (Note: Antonio Ríos Rosas, his father's uncle, had changed his name from Antonio Sánchez del Río.) His father died when Fernando was four years old. Fernando del Río later recalled summer holidays in Cádiz where he went for walks with the Andalusian anarchist Fermín Salvochea.

Del Rio attended primary school in Ronda and studied for his baccalaureate at the Real Colegio de Nuestra Señora de la Asunción (Royal School of Our Lady of the Assumption) in Córdoba. The family then moved to Madrid at the advice of his distant uncle Francisco Giner de los Ríos. His uncle had founded the Institución Libre de Enseñanza (ILE: Free Educational Institution) in 1876. He had considerable influence on Fernando, who attended the ILE in Madrid, taking courses in medicine, then in law and philosophy. At the same time he attended the Faculty of Law of the University of Madrid. While at university the articles of Miguel de Unamuno in Vida Nueva led del Rio to distance himself from the Catholic Church. He became an atheist, but retained a strong sense of morality and religiosity. He graduated in 1901.

While working on his doctorate del Rio lived in Barcelona and worked for the Compañía Arrendataria de Tabacos. In Barcelona he also contributed to the Madrid newspaper España, founded by Manuel Troyano^{(es)} of Ronda. After the summer of 1905 he went with Unamuno on a conference tour in Malaga and Ronda. After returning to Madrid he taught at the ILE. Del Río obtained the title of Doctor on 29 January 1907 with a thesis on "Political Philosophy in Plato". He won a scholarship that let him study abroad at the Sorbonne in Paris and the University of London. In London in 1907 he met the anarchist Peter Kropotkin, whom he would meet again in Russia in 1920. He also visited Belgium and Switzerland, and in 1908 won an extension scholarship that let him travel to Germany. He studied at several universities in Germany including the University of Jena and University of Marburg. During this trip he first became aware of socialism.

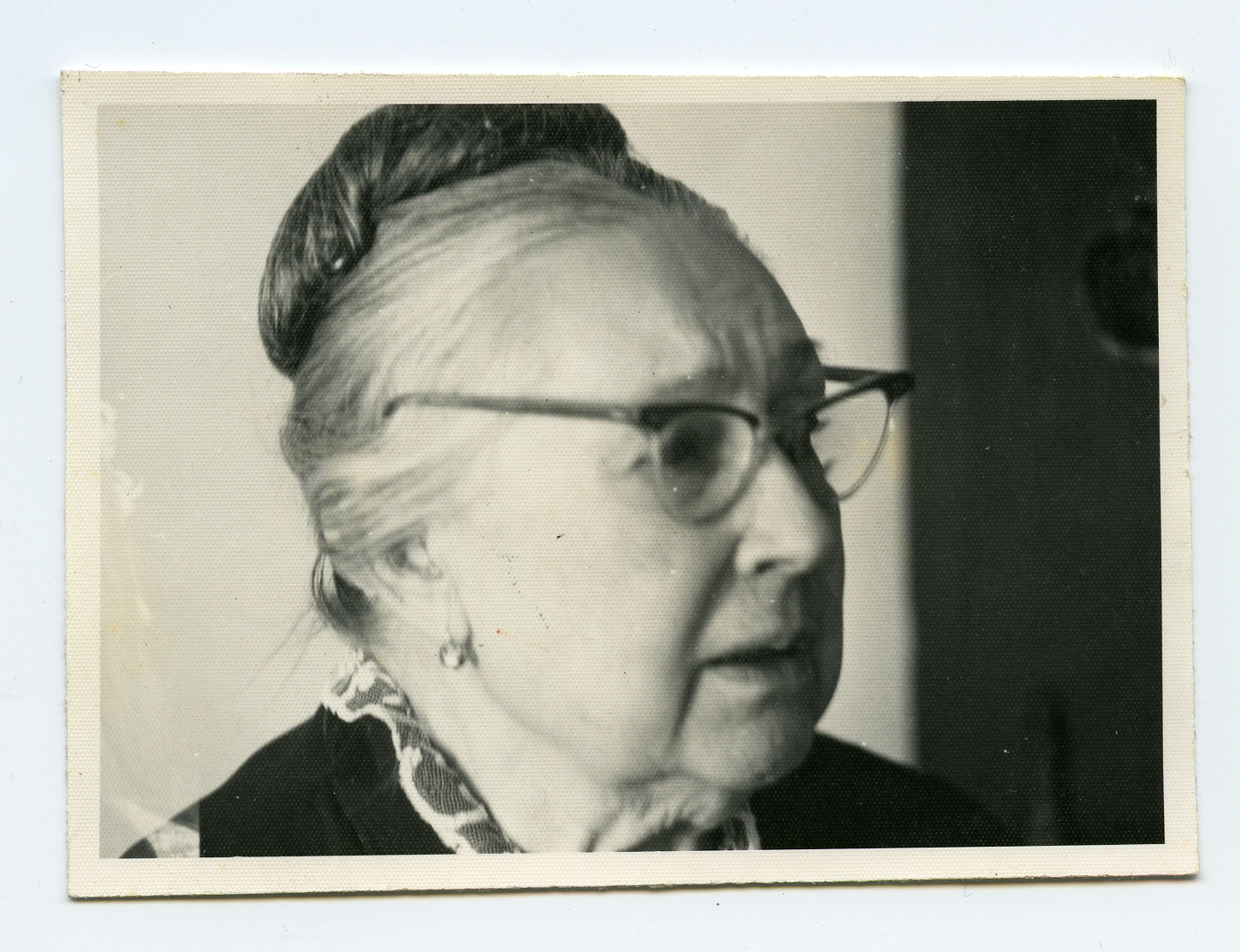
Gloria Giner de los Ríos García, wife of Fernando de los Ríos

Back in Madrid in 1910 del Río met Pablo Iglesias Posse, leader of the Spanish Socialist Workers' Party (PSOE, Partido Socialista Obrero Español), and began contributing to his newspaper El Socialista. In 1911 he won the competition for the chair of Political Law at the University of Granada. Soon after he legally changed his name from "del Río" to "de los Ríos". On 1 July 1912 in the Church of San José de Madrid he married Gloria Giner de los Ríos García, daughter of Hermenegildo Giner de los Ríos (1847-1923) and Laura García Hoppe (1853-1946). His wife was the niece of Francisco Giner. They had one daughter, Laura de los Ríos, born in May 1913.

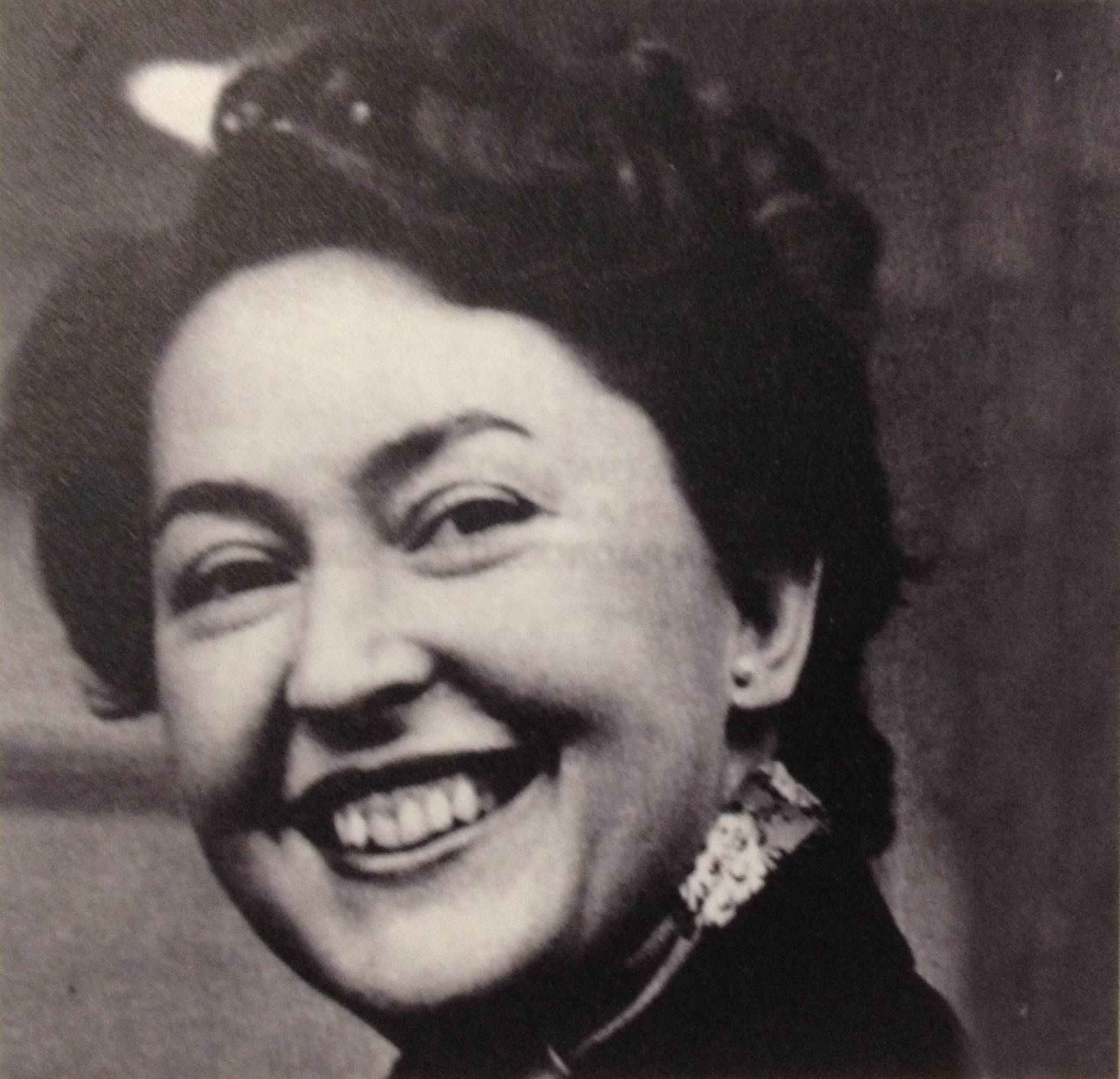
Laura de los Ríos Giner, daughter of Fernando de los Ríos Urruti and Gloria Giner de los Ríos García, wife of Francisco García Lorca^{(es)}

De los Ríos contributed to the reviews España and El Sol and supported the Reform Party of Melquíades Álvarez, but was not active in the party. Before taking up his chair in Granada, on 19 September 1911 he became a student at the Centro de Estudios Históricos^{(es)} (Center for Historical Studies), a school associated with the ILE. He moved to Granada and started teaching at the university in October 1912. One of his students was Federico García Lorca. De los Ríos loved music. When she was ten years old his daughter Laura sang at Lorca's home in an Epiphany puppet play. As a liberal intellectual de los Ríos enthusiastically supported the League for Spanish Political Education founded in 1913 by José Ortega y Gasset as a section of the Reform Party. When this failed to make progress in educating the masses he moved towards Socialism in the belief that changes in the structure of power and the economy were needed to raise up the people.

== Restoration politics (1918–1923) ==
De los Rios formally joined the PSOE in 1918 and aligned himself with moderates in the party such as Julián Besteiro and Luis Araquistáin. He was a tireless speaker and gained prominence in the party ranks due to his intellectual status. De los Ríos was PSOE candidate for Deputy for Granada in 1918 and 1919. He was elected deputy for Granada on 1 June 1919. He accompanied Francisco Largo Caballero and Araquistáin to the conference in Washington, D.C. in October 1919 where the International Labour Organization was created.

In 1920 de los Ríos was a member of the PSOE National Committee as representative of Andalusia. He attended the fourteenth congress of the Unión General de Trabajadores (UGT, General Union of Workers) in 1920 as delegate of workers in various trades, distillers and farmers of Atarfe and the General Association of Madrid Teachers. From June 1920 to September 1938 he was a member of the PSOE Executive Committee. In 1920 de los Ríos represented the socialists of Granada, Montefrío and Motril and the Sociedad Agrícola of Motril (Granada) in the PSOE Extraordinary Congress.

At the July 1920 PSOE congress de los Ríos proposed that the PSOE should join the Communist International only if defined conditions were met. He and Daniel Anguiano (Note: The pro-Soviet Daniel Anguiano was a railwayman who had been a leader in the 1917 general strike but was politically weak.) were appointed to visit Soviet Russia to discuss membership of the PSOE in the Communist International. Their trip lasted from 17 October to 13 December 1920. While in Moscow de los Ríos met Lenin, who answered a question by de los Ríos about the compatibility between personal freedom and the length of the dictatorship of the proletariat with the often-quoted answer, "Freedom, for what?". De los Rios, who believed in a Fabian-humanist form of socialism, told his hosts in Russia that the PSOE should have the right to pick and choose from the Twenty-one Conditions, and should be completely independent of Moscow. This was completely unacceptable to the Bolsheviks, who were engaged in an existential struggle in the Russian Civil War.

At the PSOE Extraordinary Congress in April 1921 Anguiano gave a positive report on the Moscow visit and de los Ríos gave a negative report. The congress voted to reject the Twenty-one Conditions demanded by Moscow. Supporters of the Third International left the PSOE and formed the Spanish Communist Workers Party, which combined with the Spanish Communist Party to form the Communist Party of Spain. De los Ríos was PSOE candidate for Deputy for Madrid in 1920, but was not elected. In 1921 he published Mi Viaje a la Rusia sovietista, a book that described his trip to Russia. A second edition came out in October 1922 and a third edition with new material in December 1934. He was PSOE candidate for Deputy for Madrid, Málaga and Valencia in 1923. He was elected deputy for Madrid on 29 April 1923.

== Dictatorship (1923–1931) ==
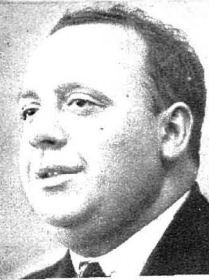
Indalecio Prieto, an ally of de los Ríos in opposing the dictatorship

De los Ríos resigned from his university chair after the military coup of Miguel Primo de Rivera in September 1923. He could not accept socialism outside of democracy, so opposed any collaboration between the PSOE and the regime. However, the majority of the party led by Besteiro agreed to take advantage of the possibilities offered by the dictatorship, leaving de los Ríos and Indalecio Prieto in a minority. Prieto left the executive but de los Ríos remained, despite protests.

In 1925 de los Ríos joined the Freemasons with the symbolic name of "Jugan". He was a member of the "Alhambra nº 34" Freemasons lodge in Granada where he reached grade 33. In 1926 he published El sentido humanista del socialismo (The Humanist Sense of Socialism) in which he argued that moral redemption of the workers must precede economic redemption, and a long period of education was needed before the workers could achieve power. He described socialism as a way to "refresh and spiritualize souls ... to open wide the floodgates of the sentiment, buried these days, of the religiosity of life.

On 12 September 1927 de los Ríos was appointed to the National Assembly as a "Representative of Activities of National Life". The government appointed six socialists to the Assembly: Largo Caballero, Lucio Martínez^{(es)}, Santiago Pérez, Francisco Núñez Tomás, Fernando de los Ríos and Manuel Llaneza^{(es)}. The PSOE and the UGT convened extraordinary sessions to consider the problems associated with the National Assembly. A resolution by the PSOE National Committee was approved on 8 October that said,

The PSOE protests with all its energy and without the slightest reservation against the dictatorial regime that has prevailed for four years. It also protests against the creation of the A.N. [National Assembly], in which no militant in our ranks will be able to take part, congratulating itself in thus agreeing with the resolution adopted yesterday in the same sense by the Unión General de Trabajadores. And it declares the imperative need for the country to be governed by sincere and comprehensive standards of freedom that allow development of our ideals, and agrees that in the governance of Spain the national will should be faithfully reflected, which is often invoked but is not consulted by democratic procedures that make known the people's true designs and oblige the government to respect them.

De los Ríos and four regional delegates formed a minority in the PSOE that voted against having a Socialist accept the position of Councilor of State, but on 25 October Largo Caballero accepted this post. De los Ríos announced his resignation from the National Assembly in the plenary session of 29 October 1927, and this was confirmed by royal order of 6 November 1927. De los Ríos, Teodomiro Menéndez, Indalecio Prieto, Gabriel Morón^{(es)}, Miguel Mora Requejo and others took the position that the PSOE should work with other republicans in taking action against the dictatorship, although the majority in the party was opposed to such an alliance.

In 1928 Fernando de los Ríos joined the student strike caused by recognition of degrees issued by private schools sanctioned by the government, which were mainly run by the Catholic Church. In 1929 he accompanied Federico García Lorca in his trip to the United States. After the fall of Primo de Rivera in March 1930 he was reinstated in his chair in the University of Granada. He moved to Madrid in 1930 and was chosen as Professor of Political Law at the Central University of Madrid. In August 1930 he and Prieto signed the Pact of San Sebastián. He, Prieto and Francisco Largo Caballero were members of the Revolutionary Committee of December 1930. When the Republican uprising of 12–13 December 1930 failed he was imprisoned, as were other leaders of the movement.

== Second Republic (1931–1939) ==
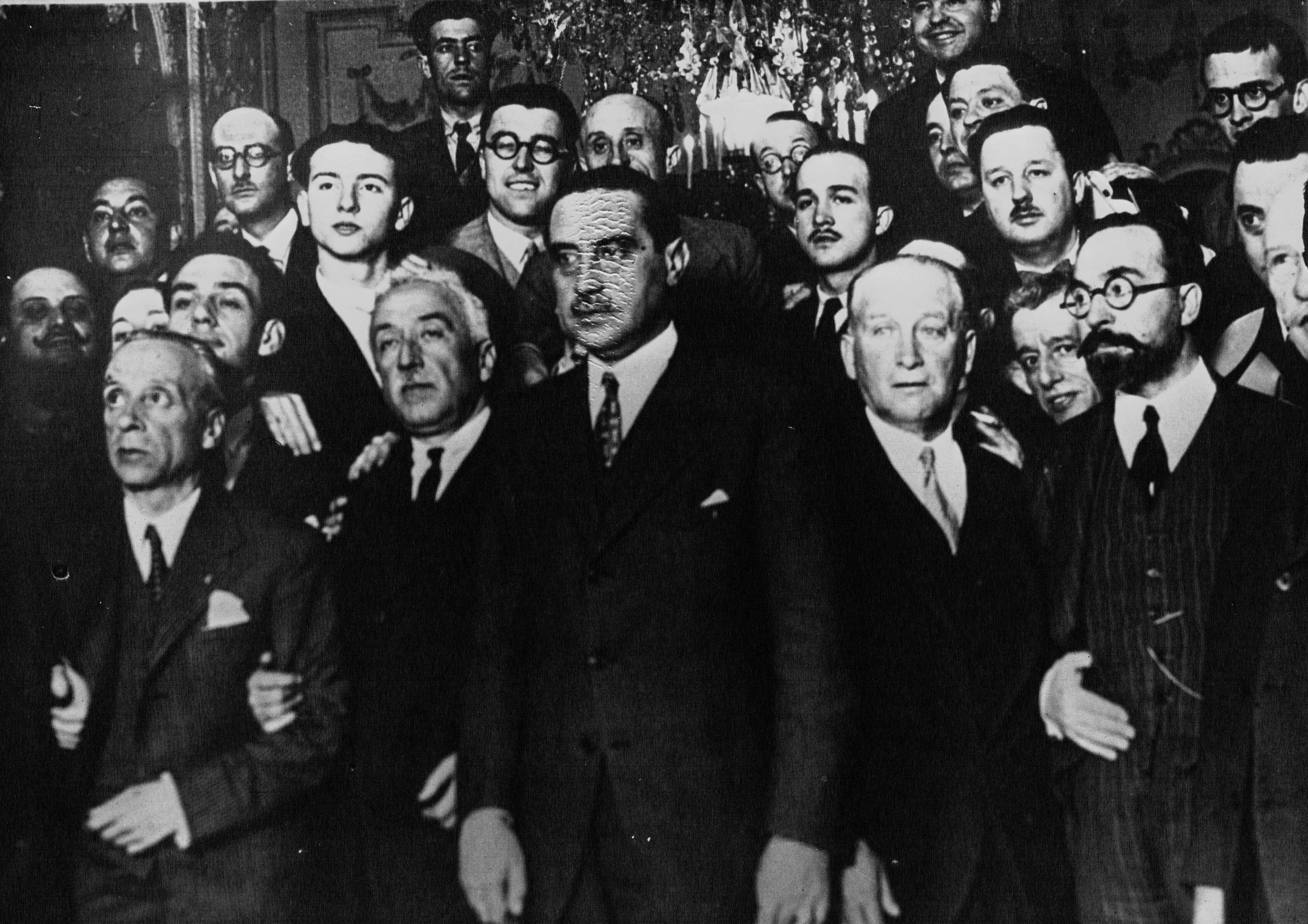
Republican government in 1931. Front row: Álvaro de Albornoz, Niceto Alcalá-Zamora, Miguel Maura, Francisco Largo Caballero, Fernando de los Ríos

In the municipal elections of 12 April 1931 de los Rios was elected to the Madrid Municipal Council but did not act in this capacity due to his other duties. On 14 April 1931 he was appointed a member of the Political Committee of the Republic. He was Minister of Grace and Justice from 14 April 1931 to 16 December 1931. When he took office he said, "I do not come to confer Grace, which is eliminated from our shield, but to do justice, because we believe that until now that has not been done." On 14 April he and two other ministers were sent to Barcelona to explain the government position to Francesc Macià, who in the euphoric mood of the time had declared Catalonia an independent state within an Iberian federation. He succeeded in persuading Maciá that this was irresponsible. De los Ríos was elected deputy for Granada on 28 June 1931.

While at the Ministry of Grace and Justice de los Ríos tactfully resolved the conflict caused by the challenge made by Cardinal Segura. Article 26 of the new constitution restricted the power of the religious orders by sharply curtailing their role in education and forcing them to register their income and property. In the heated parliamentary debate over this article in early October 1931 de los Ríos tried to counter the anticlerical tone by pointing out the valuable charitable and medical work of the Church. Manuel Azaña responded by attacking use of these functions as a vehicle for proselytizing, and on 13 October 1931 said "Spain has ceased to be a Catholic country", raising fears that the Republic intended to destroy the Church.

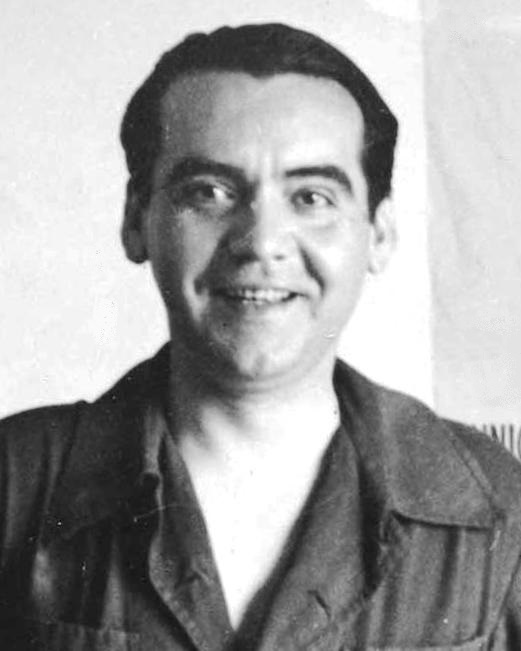
The poet and playwright Federico García Lorca, a student of de los Ríos and a close friend

De los Ríos was Minister of Public Education and Fine Arts from 16 December 1931 to 12 June 1933. At the Ministry of Public Education he undertook an ambitious program of creating public schools as alternatives to those of the Church. He supported Federico García Lorca's travelling theatre La Barraca. He created study centres that survived the civil war and the upheavals that followed, including the Granada Centre of Arabic Studies, the Madrid Centre of Arabic Studies, the Seville Centre of Spanish American Studies and the International Summer University of Santander. The International University, founded in 1932, incorporated the progressive liberal ideals of Giner's Institución Libre de Enseñanza. (Note: Today the former International University of Santander is called the Menéndez Pelayo International University, named after Marcelino Menéndez y Pelayo, an outspoken opponent of Giner.)

De los Ríos was concerned about the situation of the Sephardic Jews of Greece and the eastern Mediterranean, descendants of the Jews expelled from Spain in 1492 by the Alhambra Decree of Isabella I of Castile, and was interested in facilitating their return to Spain. He worked with Ramón Pérez de Ayala, Spanish Ambassador in Great Britain, and Abraham Yahuda, professor of Hebrew in Madrid, to persuade Albert Einstein to move to Spain. The Cabinet approved an endowed chair for Einstein at the University of Madrid on 4 April 1933. The invitation was seen by the left as atonement for the expulsion of the Jews from Spain and as a challenge to the German persecution of the Jews. The right-wing press saw it as further evidence of a Jewish-bolshevist conspiracy.

De los Ríos was Minister of State (Foreign Minister) from 12 June 1933 to 12 September 1933. He was reelected as Deputy for Granada on 19 November 1933. In the 1933–36 legislature he was a member of the committees of State and Statutes. After the brutal suppression of the Asturian miners' strike of 1934 de los Ríos was part of the investigatory committee which established proof of torture by the army. In 1935 he resigned from the PSOE Executive Committee due to a disagreement with Largo Caballero over the party's policy of alliances.

De los Ríos was again elected Deputy for Granada on 16 February 1936. In the 1936–39 legislature de los Ríos was a member of the committees of State and Public Education. At the time of the military revolt of 18 July 1936 he was teaching a summer course in Geneva. The government directed him to move to Paris, where he and Luis Jiménez de Asúa were in charge of the Spanish Embassy during the first months of the Spanish Civil War. He made unsuccessful attempts to persuade the French government to sell arms to the Republic. In December 1936 he was appointed Spanish Ambassador to the United States, where he remained until the end of the civil war.

== Exile (1939–1949) ==
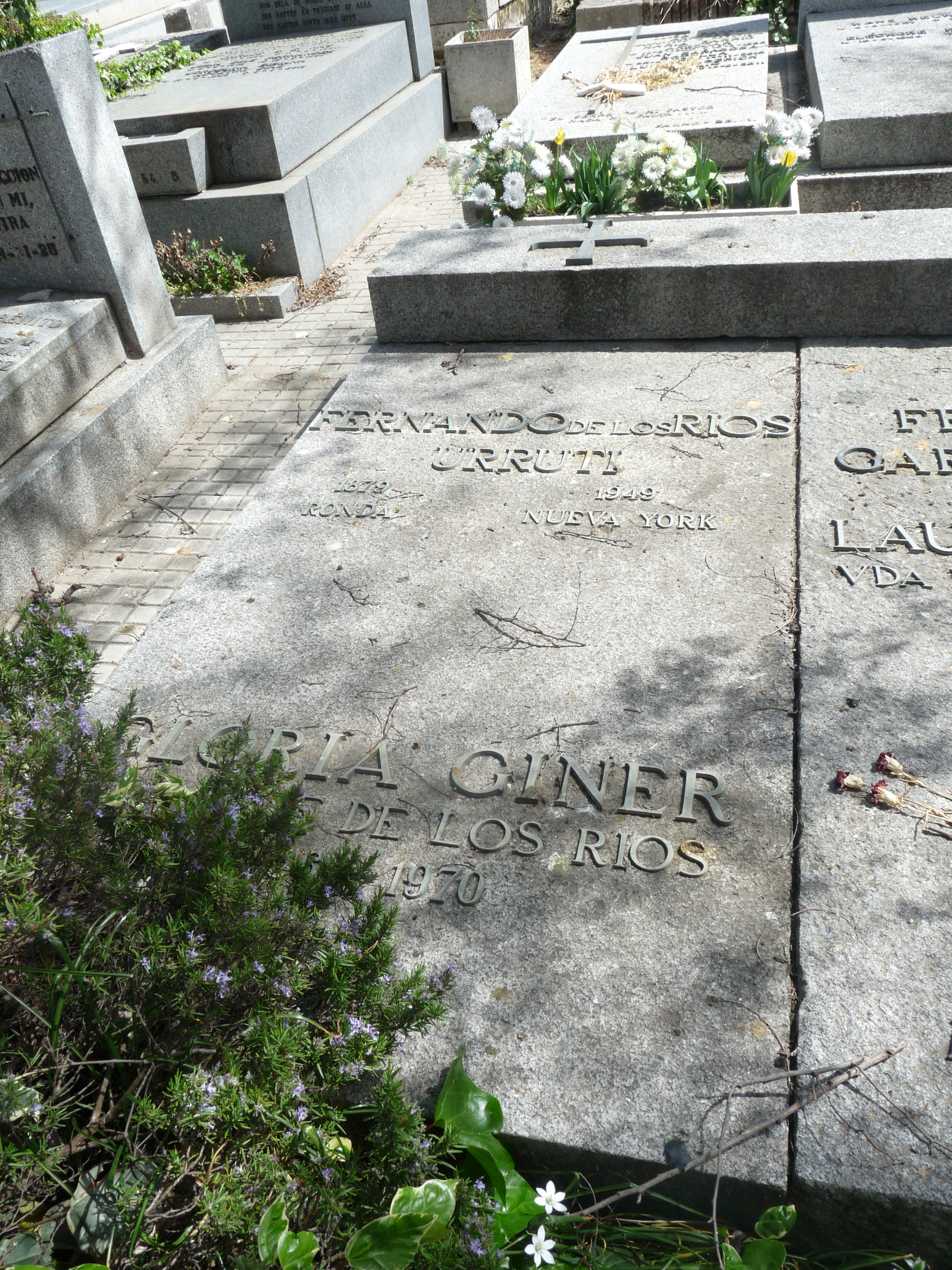
Tomb of Fernando de los Rios

After the civil war de los Ríos left the Spanish embassy on 31 March 1939 to accept the offer of a professorship from Alvin Saunders Johnson, rector of the New School for Social Research in New York City. De los Ríos took his family to New York, including his mother Fernanda Urruti. His wife, Gloria Giner de los Ríos, gave classes in Spanish language and style at Columbia University and published texts on Spanish culture and civilization.

When the first Republican government-in-exile was formed in August 1945 its president, José Giral, appointed de los Ríos Minister of State. He resigned from this position in March 1946, since he refused to be part of a government that included the Communist Party of Spain. He became official observer of the Republican government in exile before the United Nations. Fernando de los Ríos died on 31 May 1949 in New York City. His remains were returned to Spain on 28 June 1980 and rest in the Cementerio de la Almudena in Madrid.

== Publications ==
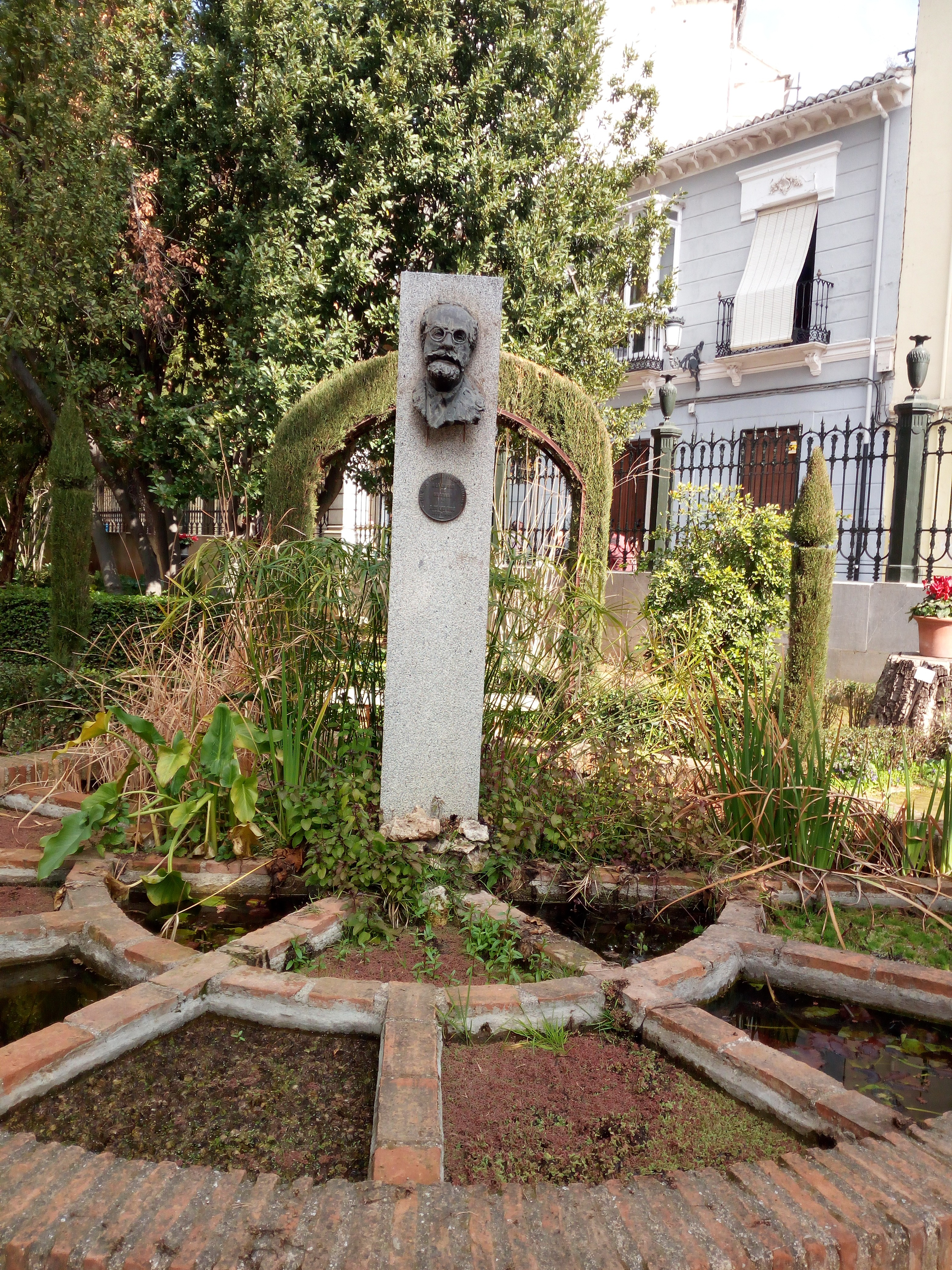
Monument to De los Ríos in the botanical garden of the University of Granada

Publications by de los Ríos include:

- Fernando de Ríos Urruti (1901), Tres discursos sobre la cuestión religiosa, la Constitución, la organización de la Justicia
- Fernando de Ríos Urruti (1910), La Filosofía del Derecho en Don Francisco Giner y su relación con el pensamiento contemporáneo
- Fernando de Ríos Urruti (1911), La filosofía política en Platón
- Fernando de los Rios (1912), Los Orígenes del socialismo moderno, Madrid: impr. de F. Peña Cruz, p. 44
- Fernando de los Rios (1920), Vida e instituciones del pueblo de Andorra, una supervivencia señorial, Madrid: tip. de la "Rev. de arch., bibl. y museos", p. 164
- Fernando de Ríos Urruti (1920), Vida e instituciones del pueblo de Andorra : una supervivencia señorial
- Fernando de Ríos Urruti (1921), Mi viaje a la Rusia sovietista
- Jean Jacques Rousseau; Fernando de los Ríos Urruti (1921), El contrato social (in Spanish), Calpe
- Fernando de Ríos Urruti (1923), Aguilita
- Fernando de los Rios (1926), El Sentido humanista del socialismo
  - Fernando de los Rios (1976), El Sentido humanista del socialismo, Madrid: Elías Díaz / Castalia, p. 327
- Fernando de los Rios (1927), Religión y Estado en la España del siglo XVI
  - Fernando de los Rios (1957), Religión y Estado en la España del siglo XVI, Preface by Ángel del Río, México, Buenos Aires : Fondo de cultura económica, p. 200
- Fernando de Ríos Urruti (1932), El profesor y el político; Cultura y Estado
- Fernando de los Ríos Urruti (1932), Escuela y despensa: (homenaje a Costa) (in Spanish), Fundación Fernando de los Rios
- Fernando de Ríos Urruti (1937), What is happening in Spain
- Fernando de los Rios (1938), La Posición de las Universidades ante el problema del mundo actual, Publicaciones de la revista "Universidad de La Habana", p. 23
- Francisco Giner de los Ríos; Fernando de los Ríos (1949), El Pensamiento vivo de Giner de los Ríos (in Spanish), Ed. Losada
- Fernando de Ríos Urruti (1951), ¿Adónde va el Estado? : estudios filosófico-políticos
- Fernando de Los Ríos (1956), Ciencia y conciencia (in Spanish), Universidad de La Habana
- Fernando de Ríos Urruti (1960), Sentido y significación de España
- Fernando de los Rios (1975), Escritos sobre democracia y socialismo, Madrid: Taurus, p. 441
- Fernando de los Rios (1995), Epistolario selectivo, Barcelona, Málaga, Marbella: Manuel J. Peláez, p. 152
- Fernando de Ríos Urruti (1995), Martí y su visión de la libertad 1ª ed.
- Fernando de los Ríos (1997), Teresa Rodríguez de Lecea (ed.), Obras completas: Escritos guerra civil y exilio (in Spanish), Anthropos Editorial, ISBN 978-84-7658-515-3
- Fernando de Ríos Urruti (1999), Discursos parlamentarios
- Indalecio Prieto y Tuero; Fernando de los Rios (2010), Epistolario, 1924-1948, Madrid: Centro de estudios políticos y constitucionales / Octavio Ruiz-Manjón Cabeza, p. 251
- Fernando de Ríos Urruti (2017), Correspondencia familiar

== Sources ==
- Biografía (in Spanish), Fundación Fernando de los Ríos, archived from the original on 2019-10-24
- Bleiberg, Germán; Ihrie, Maureen; Pérez, Janet (1993), "RIOS, Fernando de los", Dictionary of the Literature of the Iberian Peninsula, Greenwood Publishing Group, ISBN 978-0-313-28732-9
- Cuenca Toribio, José Manuel; Miranda García, Soledad (January–March 1991), "Sociología de los ministros de la II República", Revista de Estudios Políticos (in Spanish) (71)
- Fernando de los Rios (1879-1949) (in French), BnF: Bibliotheque nationale de France
- "Fernando de los Ríos", Biografias y Vidas (in Spanish)
- Flesler, Daniela; Linhard, Tabea Alexa; Pérez Melgosa, Adrián (2015-07-16), Revisiting Jewish Spain in the Modern Era, Routledge, ISBN 978-1-317-98057-5
- Guerrero, Enrique (1978), "El Socialismo en la Dictadura de Primo De Rivera", Revista de Derecho Político (in Spanish) (1), Universidad Nacional de Educación a Distancia (UNED): 59, doi:10.5944/rdp.1.1978.7961, ISSN 2174-5625
- Hess, Carol A. (2005), Sacred Passions: The Life and Music of Manuel de Falla, Oxford University Press, ISBN 978-0-19-514561-8
- Lipp, Solomon (2006-01-01), Francisco Giner de los Rios: A Spanish Socrates, Wilfrid Laurier Univ. Press, ISBN 978-0-88920-725-7
- Montagut, Eduardo (21 February 2015), "El primer Fernando de los Ríos", Nuevatribuna (in Spanish)
- Resultados de la búsqueda ^A974748 (in Spanish), BNE: Biblioteca Nacional de España
- Rios, Fernando de los (1934), Mi Viaje a la Rusia sovietista (PDF)
- Ríos Urruti, Fernando de los : Elecciones 12.9.1927 (in Spanish), Congreso de los Diputados
- Ríos Urruti, Fernando de los (in Spanish), FPI: Fundación Pablo Iglesias, 20 February 2012
- Ríos Urruti, Fernando de los : Relación de elecciones en las que fue diputado (in Spanish), Congreso de los Diputados
- Romero, Antonio M. (21 October 2017), "Fernando de los Ríos, un intelectual en el Gobierno republicano", Sur (in Spanish), Malaga: Prensa Malagueña, S.A.
- Romero Salvadó, Francisco J.; Smith, Angel (2010-05-26), The Agony of Spanish Liberalism: From Revolution to Dictatorship 1913–23, Palgrave Macmillan UK, ISBN 978-0-230-27464-8
- Ruiz-Manjón Cabeza, Octavio (2007), "Gloria Giner de los Ríos : noticia biográfica de una madrileña", Cuadernos de historia contemporánea (in Spanish), ISSN 0214-400X
- Villena, Miguel Ángel (22 November 2000), "Una biografía rescata del olvido la figura de Fernando de los Ríos", El Pais (in Spanish), Madrid
