= Isabel Ferrer Giner =

Spanish noblewoman and philanthropist

Isabel Ferrer Giner (also Isabel Ferrer y Giner, Isabel Ferrer) (1736-1794), was a Spanish noblewoman and philanthropist. She was a member of a rich noble family who never married but dedicated her life to pious charity, financed by her large personal dowry fortune. She founded and made donations to numerous schools and hospitals in contemporary Catalonia, and was particularly known for her school for girls, where poor girls were taught religion and the profession of sewing in order to support themselves.
