= Silvia Giner =

Spanish actress

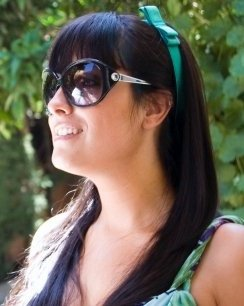
- Born: Silvia Giner Vergara; 31 December 1980 (age 44); Seville, Spain
- Website: http://www.silviaginer.es

Silvia Giner Vergara (born in Seville, Andalusia, Spain, 31 December 1980) is a Spanish actress.

== Background ==
Vergara's education include drama studies with Ramon Guzman Resino, and Management Information Systems at university.

In 2005, she made her first foray into Latin American cinema in Buenos Aires, Argentina, in Space of appearances (El espacio de las apariencias), which launched her career in films. The cinema website Cineando referred to her as, "The Wonderful future of Spanish cinema".

In 2011 she had her first and only daughter.

In 2012, to recover from injuries caused by an illness in her uterus, she began practicing Pole Dance. She then fell in love with this sporting discipline and decided to begin her studies in Catalonia (Spain) to become a Pole Sports instructor and be able to found her own school.

In 2015 he founded his own school called Aerial Dreams. In this school he would train athletes and create the first federated competitions, some attached to the IPSF International Pole Sports Federation.

The Social website Sevilla Magazine referred to her as, "The actress who dreamed of returning and achieved it".

During this process Silvia continued carrying out minor projects that allowed her to continue with her artistic research and also with her Aerial Dreams school and artistic projects such as circus theaters. She resumed his acting studies to retrain himself with new currents regarding interpretation, so he dedicated the years from 2017 to 2023 researching in different artistic laboratories and with different coaches.

She currently lives in Sevilla, Spain.

== Filmography ==
=== Cinema ===
- Amo Cada Átomo de tu Cuerpo (2022).
- La Peste (2019).
- Sujeto Darwin (2018).
- El Mundo es Suyo Actress Credit and Thanks for Pole Dance Performance (2018).
- Episodio III - Crónicas de la Vieja República (Delayed)
- Los Girasoles Ciegos (2007).
- El espacio de las apariencias (2006).
- El Ángel Caído (2005).
- Hermanas cada 1 de Noviembre (2005).
- Ricardo, Piezas Descatalogadas (2005).
- Amazonas, últimos días (2004).
- La Superamigas contra el DR.Vinilo (2003).
- La Vida de Rita (2003).
- Navidad en el Nilo (2002).
- Pleno al Quince (1999).
- Alianza Mortal (2001).
- La Nevera (2000).

=== Theatre ===
- Acóplate. Directed by Carlos Rico. (2007).
