= Terque =

Terque, Spain
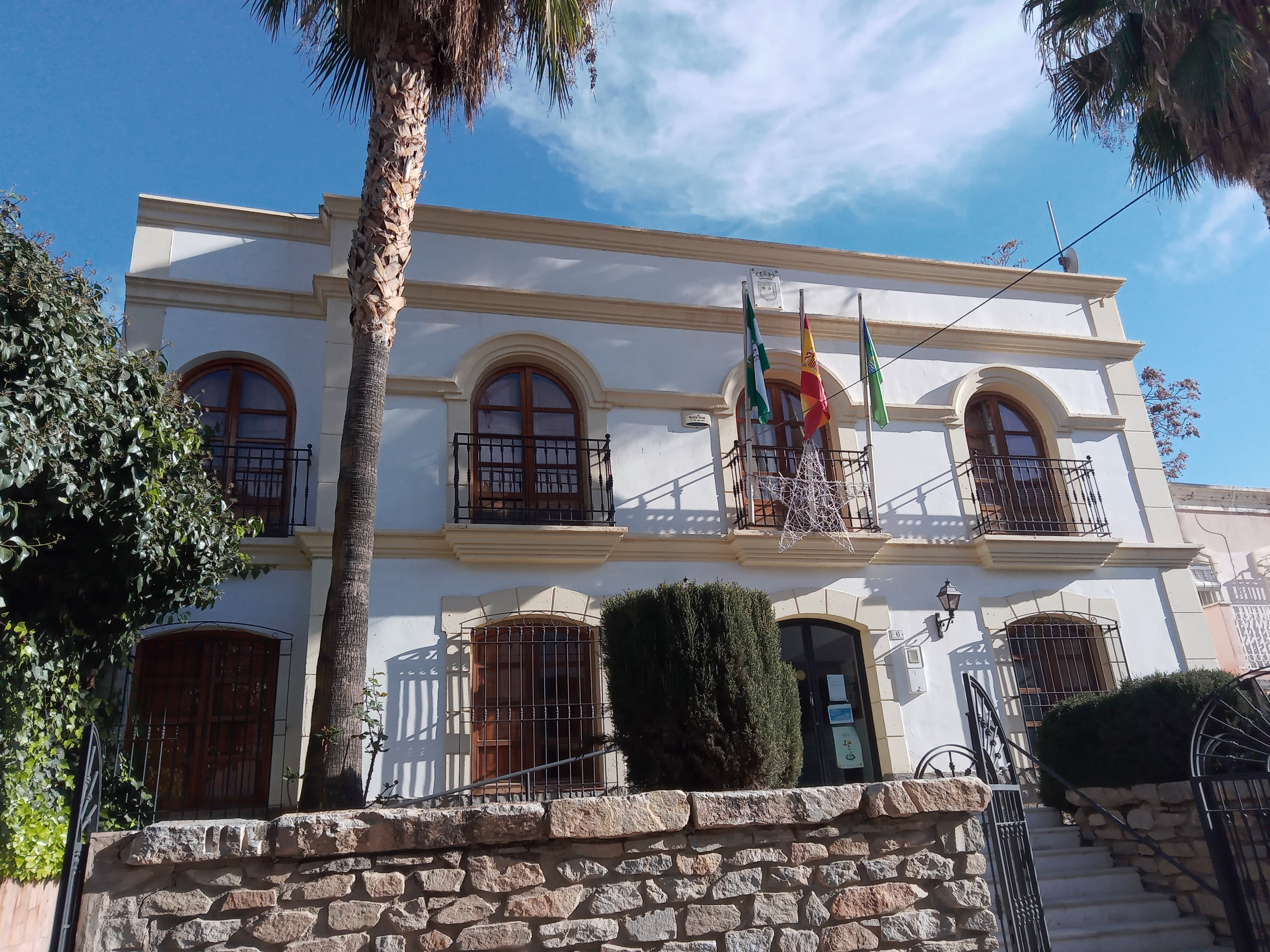
- Town hall

- Flag Coat of arms
- Interactive map of Terque, Spain
- Coordinates: 36°59′N 2°35′W
- Country: Spain
- Community: Andalusia
- Municipality: Almería

Government
  - Mayor: Baldomero Cadenas Giralt (PSOE)

Area
  - Total: 16 km^{2} (6.2 sq mi)
- Elevation: 300 m (980 ft)

Population (2025-01-01)
  - Total: 393
  - Density: 25/km^{2} (64/sq mi)
- Time zone: UTC+1 (CET)
  - Summer (DST): UTC+2 (CEST)

Terque is a municipality of Almería province, in the autonomous community of Andalusia, Spain.

== Demographics ==
Historical population
Year	Pop.	±%
1999	421	—
2000	430	+2.1%
2001	456	+6.0%
2002	463	+1.5%
2003	470	+1.5%
2004	457	−2.8%
2005	464	+1.5%
Source: INE (Spain)

== See also ==
- List of municipalities in Almería
