= Almanzora (comarca) =

- Comarca
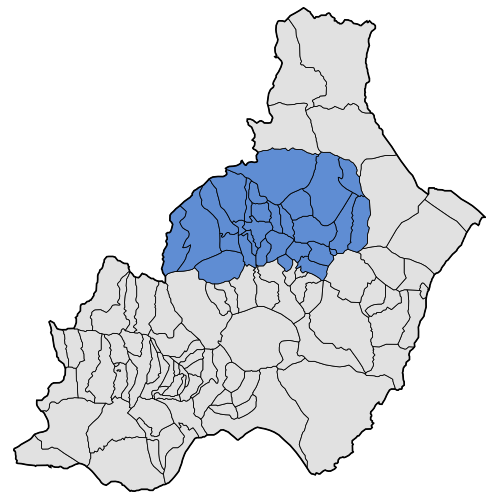
- Coordinates: 37°20′29″N 2°18′25″W
- Country: Spain
- Autonomous community: Andalusia
- Province: Almería

Area
  - Total: 1,406 km^{2} (543 sq mi)

Population (2010)
  - Total: 57,039
  - Density: 40.57/km^{2} (105.1/sq mi)

Almanzora is a comarca in the province of Almería, Andalusia, Spain. It contains the following municipalities:

- Albanchez
- Albox
- Alcóntar
- Arboleas
- Armuña de Almanzora
- Bacares
- Bayarque
- Cantoria
- Chercos
- Cóbdar
- Fines
- Laroya
- Líjar
- Lúcar
- Macael
- Olula del Río
- Oria
- Partaloa
- Purchena
- Serón
- Sierro
- Somontín
- Suflí
- Taberno
- Tíjola
- Urrácal
- Zurgena
