= Almanzora (river) =

River in Spain

Coordinates: 37.2387°N 1.77687°W

Almanzora River
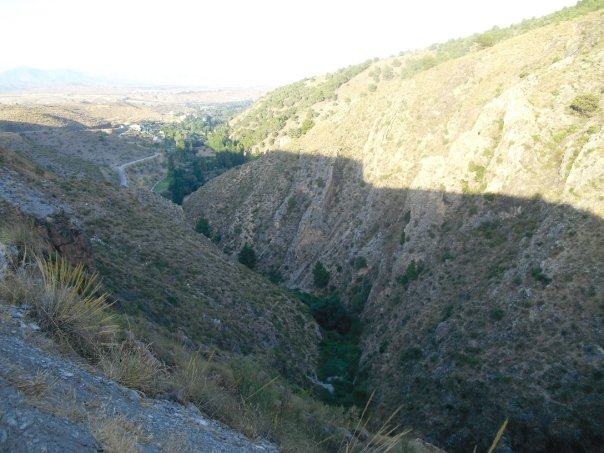
- Near the source in "La Cerrá", in Alcóntar.

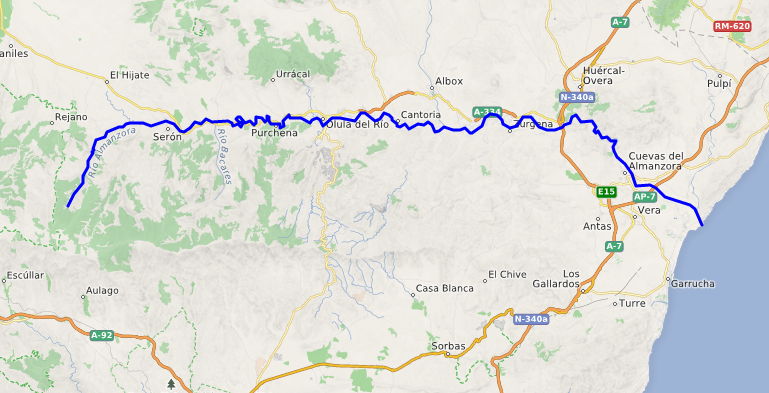

Location
- Country: Spain

Physical characteristics
- Source
  - elevation: 1,972 metres (6,470 ft)
- Mouth
  - location: Mediterranean Sea (at Cuevas del Almanzora)
  - elevation: 0 metres (0 ft)
- Length: 90 kilometres (56 mi)

Basin features
- Tributaries
  - left: Rambla de Albox
  - right: Albánchez Arroyo, Bacares River, Río del Valle

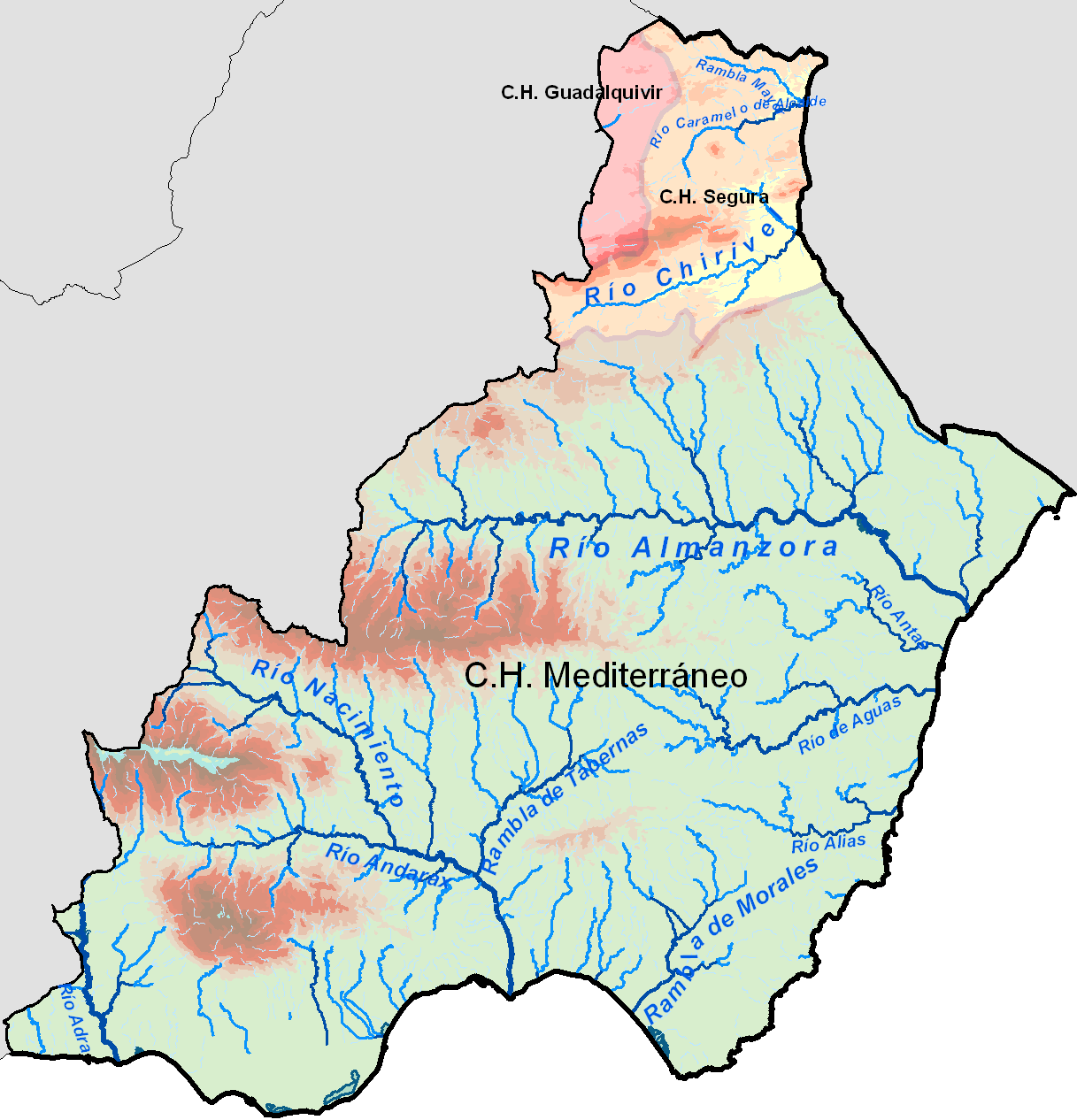
Hydrography of the province of Almería. For most of its course, the Almanzora runs almost exactly from west to east.

The Almanzora River (Spanish: Río Almanzora) is a river in the province of Almería in Andalusia, Spain.

The Almanzora river rises on the northern slope of the Sierra de Los Filabres on the border between the provinces of Granada and Almeria. It passes through the cities of Seron, Tíjola, Purchena Cantoria, Albox, Arboleas, and Zurgena, and passes near the town of Huercal Overa, and through the town of Cuevas del Almanzora before emptying into the Mediterranean Sea in Punta del Rio, between Palomares and Villaricos, after a journey of 90 kilometres (56 mi).

Sometimes, it becomes swollen as in September 2012. A previous flood occurred in October 1973.

The Almanzora basin is bounded to the south by the Sierra de los Filabres, which rises to 2,168 metres (7,113 ft). Other highlights are the Tetica Bacares at 2,080 metres (6,820 ft) and Dos Picos at 2,086 metres (6,844 ft). To the south, neighboring watersheds are those of Andarax River (via the Nacimiento River and the Rambla de Tabernas), the Rio de Aguas and Antas River.

To the west and north, it is bounded by the Sierra de las Estancias, which includes the Sierra de Lúcar at 1,722 metres (5,650 ft), the Sierra del Madroñal at 1,350 metres (4,430 ft), the Sierra de Oria at 1,500 metres (4,900 ft), and the Sierra del Saliente at 1,450 metres (4,760 ft). To the west, adjoining watersheds is that of the Guadalquivir (via the Rio de Baza and rio Guardal joining the Guadalquivir River Guadiana Menor via rio).

To the east, it is bounded by the top of Cabezo de la Jara at 1,246 metres (4,088 ft), by the Sierra de Enmedio which rises to 856 metres (2,808 ft) at Cerro del Medro, by the Sierra de la Almenara at 639 metres (2,096 ft), and the Almagrera sierra, which rises to 367 metres (1,204 ft) at Mount Tenerife. Toward the north and east, the watershed is that of Segura (via the rambla de Chirivel and rio Guadalentin).

The Ancient Romans called it the Surbo, from Latin flumen superbum, "superb river", for its terrible floods. Its present name derives from the Arabic al-Mansura (المنصورة), "place of victory".
