= Albox =

Albox, Spain
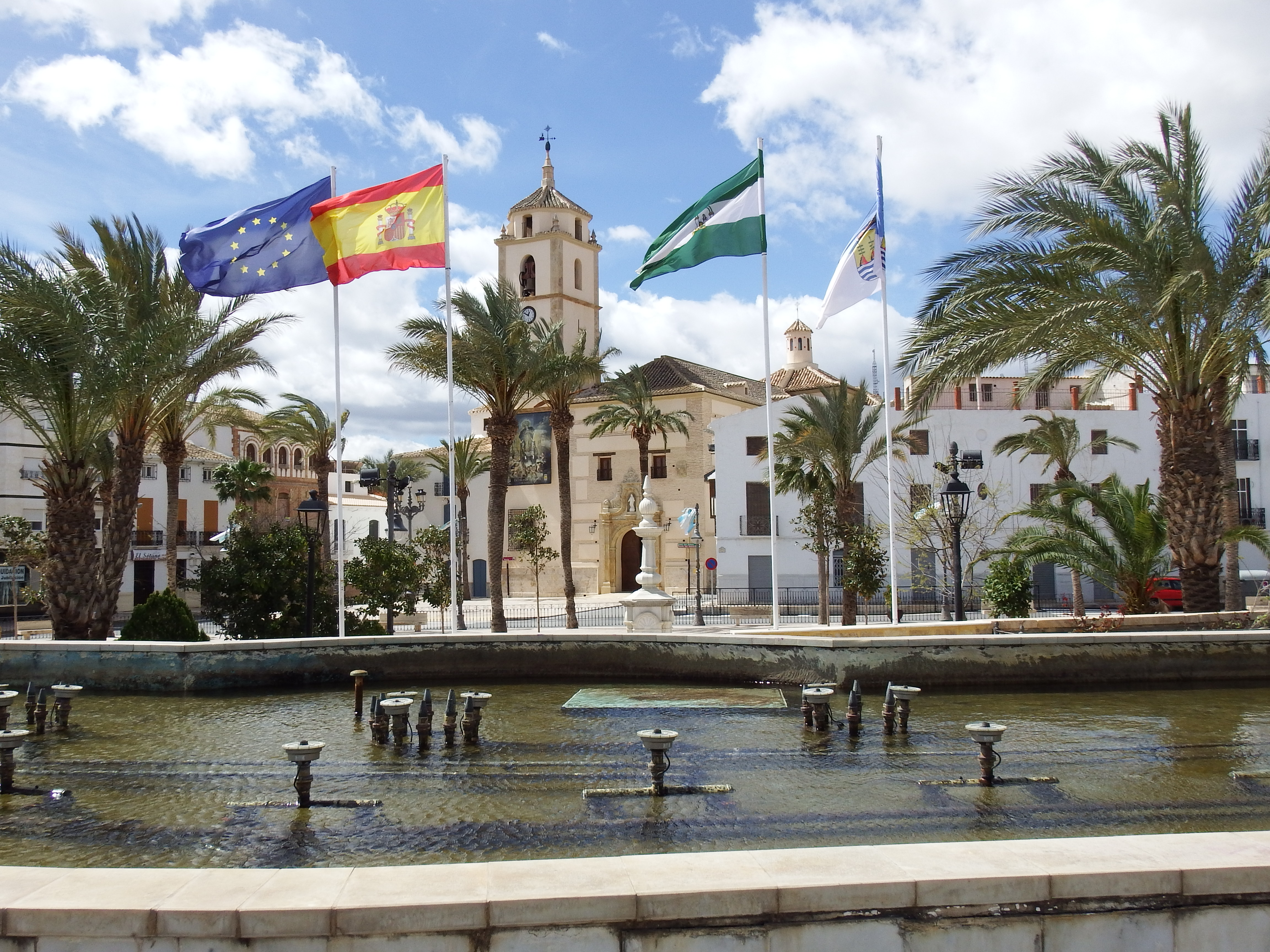
- View of Albox

- Flag Coat of arms

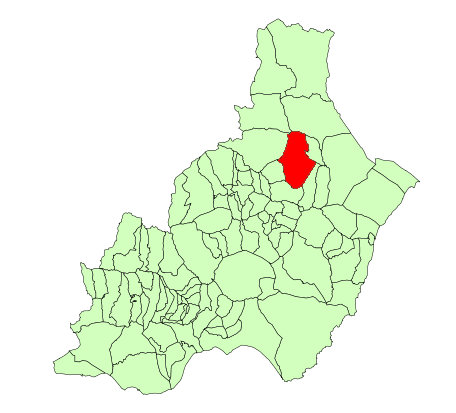
- Coordinates: 37°23′N 2°08′W
- Country: Spain
- Community: Andalusia
- Province: Almería

Government
  - Mayor: Maria del Mar Alfonso Perez

Area
  - Total: 168 km^{2} (65 sq mi)
- Elevation: 420 m (1,380 ft)

Population (2025-01-01)
  - Total: 12,799
  - Density: 76.2/km^{2} (197/sq mi)
- Time zone: UTC+1 (CET)
  - Summer (DST): UTC+2 (CEST)
- Website: albox.es

Albox is a Spanish municipality in the province of Almería in the autonomous community of Andalusia. It is situated in the north eastern part of Valle del Almanzora and 120 km from the provincial capital, Almería. In 2024 it had 12,408 inhabitants. Its area is 168.42 km^{2} and it has a population density of 74 inhabitants/km^{2}.

The municipality is made up of the areas of Albox, Llano de las Ánimas, Llano del Espino, Llano de Los Olleres, La Molata and Las Pocicas. Other scattered areas are Fuente del Marqués and Aljambra.

== Geography ==
=== Location ===
Northwest: Oria y Chirivel	North: Vélez-Rubio	Northeast: Vélez-Rubio
West: Oria y Partaloa	cardinal points	East: Taberno y Arboleas
Southwest: Cantoria	South: Cantoria	Southeast: Arboleas y Cantoria

Situated in the basin of the Almanzora river. It has a superficial area of 168 km^{2} delimited to the north by Chirivel and Vélez-Rubio, to the south by Cantoria, to the east by Taberno and Arboleas, and to the west by Oria and Partaloa.

=== Climate ===
Albox has a hot subtropical semi-arid climate (Köppen climate classification BSh).

Climate data for Albox 420m asl
Month	Jan	Feb	Mar	Apr	May	Jun	Jul	Aug	Sep	Oct	Nov	Dec	Year
Mean daily maximum °C (°F)	15 (59)	17 (63)	19 (66)	21 (70)	25 (77)	31 (88)	35 (95)	35 (95)	29 (84)	24 (75)	19 (66)	16 (61)	24 (75)
Mean daily minimum °C (°F)	6 (43)	6 (43)	8 (46)	10 (50)	14 (57)	18 (64)	21 (70)	22 (72)	18 (64)	15 (59)	9 (48)	7 (45)	13 (55)
Average rainfall mm (inches)	24 (0.9)	25 (1.0)	27 (1.1)	31 (1.2)	30 (1.2)	11 (0.4)	2 (0.1)	5 (0.2)	20 (0.8)	23 (0.9)	32 (1.3)	24 (0.9)	254 (10)
Average rainy days (≥ 1.0 mm)	5.6	5.7	5.4	6.3	7.0	3.8	1.4	2.7	5.8	5.9	6.4	6.0	62
Source: Meteoblue

== History ==
Due to its geographical position it has seen the passage of many cultures, vestiges of which can be seen to this day in various archaeological sites.

Albox owes its foundation and settlement to the Arabs (its name means 'tower' in Arabic) with a history widely linked to the medieval splendour of the Kingdom of Granada from the 13th century. In the midst of the Christian Reconquest, in the 15th century, Albox was taken from the Arabs by the troops of the Military Governor of the Kingdom of Murcia (Crown of Castilla), Alonso Yáñez Fajardo, and later incorporated into his title holdings as Marquess of los Vélez.

Around 1500 a strong earthquake hit Albox destroying a large part of the town, making it necessary to demolish the ancient castle and the damaged homes were repaired with its stone. Albox took part in the continuous and persistent Moorish uprisings that occurred in the Kingdom of Granada throughout the 15th century. It was King Felipe II who, after defeating the Moors, decreed the expulsion of the Arabs from the Comarca and the re-population of the town with Christians from Valencia and La Mancha, constituting a municipal council or town hall in 1563, under the hand of its first Mayor, Anton de Andrano. Although the Barrio Alto of San Antonio - with an irregular layout of steep streets converging on a small central square - was the original nucleus of the town of Albox, it is however in la Loma de San Francisco - named after an ancient settlement of the Franciscan Third Order - that most expansion and development took place in the 17th and 18th centuries. This is due to the connection of Albox with tragic floods and earthquakes which have plagued this area periodically. The most momentous event for Albox occurred in 1716 when the venerated image of Nuestra Senora del Saliente came to the town and two priests from Albox founded the Santuario on Mt. Roel. From this date the history of Albox cannot be understood without the deep imprint of this Marian devotion. During the 19th century the town played a major role in the fight against French invaders, with records showing two bloody skirmishes in the years 1810 and 1811. This was the period of greatest economic boom in Albox, thanks to its looms and craft pottery works. Its commercial tradition has made it an economic hub between Baza (Granada) and Lorca(Murcia)

=== Historic events ===
Documents in local archives and the Royal Chancery in Granada, reveal the panic in the town when residents were forced by an earthquake to abandon their partially destroyed homes and sleep in the open on the banks of the Rambla. Another historic event was the Yellow Fever epidemic which broke out in Cartagena and spread implacably, taking lives, throughout all the towns of Spanish Levante (Granada and Almeria included). Also a terrible flood destroyed Albox on 11 September 1891. Another major flood struck the town on 26 June 1900 causing 6 deaths and the destruction of the upper part of the stone wall built by the Royal Commission after the floods of 1891. Electric street lighting came to Albox on 8 January 1914, replacing street lamps.

Drinking water came to taps in Albox in June 2014.

== Demographics ==
Historical population
Year	Pop.	±%
1999	9,671	—
2000	9,599	−0.7%
2001	9,661	+0.6%
2002	9,974	+3.2%
2003	10,409	+4.4%
2004	10,680	+2.6%
2005	11,271	+5.5%
2006	11,000	−2.4%
2007	11,106	+1.0%
2008	11,427	+2.9%
2009	11,178	−2.2%
2010	11,042	−1.2%
2011	11,091	+0.4%
2012	10,821	−2.4%
2013	10,409	−3.8%
2014	11,715	+12.5%
2015	11,429	−2.4%
2016	11,144	−2.5%
2017	11,481	+3.0%
2018	11,696	+1.9%
2019	11,805	+0.9%
Source: INE (Spain)

== Transportation ==
- The regional road A-334 runs through Albox uniting the localities of Huercal-Overa and Baza traversing the Almanzora valley.
- For years Albox had a railway station located in Almanzora. 'Station Road' (ALP-831) is the old road to the railway station in Almanzora. This road runs for 3 km to the station. It runs parallel to the Rambla of Albox and crosses the areas of Albox, La Molata, Barrio las zorras and Almanzora. In 1985 the railway station was closed to traffic. A plan exists to reopen the Guadix-Almendricos subject to the approval of the regional administration.
- Almeria Airport is the closest, some 90 km away in the city of Almeria, while there is a heliport for emergency landings.
- There is almost no taxi service in Albox.

== Religious Monuments ==
=== Parish Church of Santa María ===
Construction began on the oldest religious building in Albox in the 16th century after the Reconquest of the Religious Monarchs. With additions in later centuries, it is an artistic building although one stripped of its treasure after religious persecution. It has a baroque façade that is very similar to the convent of the Pure in the city of Almeria.

=== Parish Church of la Concepción ===
The bequest of the priest Don Lázaro de Martos permitted the founding of a Hospice of the Franciscan Order in the 18th century. The presence of the friars and the construction of the convent chapel contributed to the growth of the barrio of La Loma de Albox. After the expulsion of the Franciscans, the chapel remained as a subsidiary church of the Parish of Santa Maria. In 1885, after the proclamation of the immaculate dogma, it was dedicated to the Conception of our Lady. In 1900 it was elevated to a Parish Church in honour of the extraordinary work of the Servant of God, Don Juan Ibáñez between 1911 and 1936. Thanks to his ministry the Scouts Group was founded and a Parish Hall was constructed to develop the neighbourhood. After the flood of 1973, the old building was demolished and replaced by a simple construction. In 1999, Bishop Álvarez Gastón consecrated the present church. Inside the church, in addition to the image of the Immaculate Conception, they worship St. Francis Of Assisi and the titleholders of Brotherhood of St. John the Evangelist. The Sepulchre of Servant of God, Don Juan Ibáñez, who was martyred in the Religious Persecution of 1936 can be found in the Sacristy. The Congregation of Sisters of Jesús María have worked in the parish since 1975. Parish Church of Nuestra Señora del Carmen in Llano de los Olleres

During the terrible cholera epidemic of 1864 the residents of the area of Llano de los Olleres promised Our Lady of Carmel that they would build her a church if she stopped the epidemic. As this happened, these farm labourers put all their efforts into constructing this religious building. It was blessed in 1870 and enriched during the following decades with donations. The Acción Católica apostolate in Almeria was founded by the Servant of God Don Antonio Lorca Muñoz who was also the parish priest of Santa María church in Albox. Sacked during the time of religious persecution, the church was rebuilt by residents in 1939. Bishop Casares Hervás raised its status to parish church in 1973. Currently, due to its state of deterioration, it is being restored.

=== Hermitage of Santa Cruz ===
Situated at the highest point in La Loma de Albox, it was founded by the Franciscans, as the culmination of an artistic Way of the Cross in the 18th century. Later on the old town cemetery was situated on its esplanade. In the twenties, the Servant of God don Juan Ibáñez planted the current pine grove which gives it great beauty. Totally destroyed during the religious persecution, it was rebuilt according to the design of Don Bartolomé Marín, a native canon of the neighbourhood with an extensive artistic career. It is a place of great devotion.

=== Parish Church of Santa Bárbara de Las Pocicas ===
Constructed in the mid 19th century en El Lugarico, now Las Posicas, it is dedicated to the virgin and martyr Saint Barbara. It was soon extended and converted into a Parish church by Bishop Ródenas García in the mid 20th century. At the beginning of 21st century, the priest Don José Navarro, a native of Las Pocicas, endowed the church with an artistic altarpiece which houses the venerated image of the patron saint.

=== Diocesan Shrine of our Lady of Saliente ===
One of the most important religious buildings in all of the province of Almeria. It was constructed in 1716 by local priests Fr Lázaro de Martos and Fr Roque. Magnificently extended by Bishop Sanz y Torres constituting a Shrine, Episcopal Palace and Guesthouse and Convent. The sacred image of our Lady of Hope for the Abandoned. It is a small baroque carving that can be compared stylistically to the Roldana (Luisa Roldana) school. It is, without doubt, the best example of the baroque style in the province. In 1988 the sacred image was crowned by the Apostolic Nuncio on behalf of Pope John Paul II. It is the religious heart of Albox.

=== Hermitage of San Antonio de Padua ===
Situated in the Barrio Alto, it is dedicated to St. Anthony of Padua. It celebrates the feast day of its namesake on 13 June.

=== Parish Church of Nuestra Señora de los Dolores in Llano del Espino ===
Situated in Llano del Espino, it is dedicated to Our Lady of the Sorrows and has its own chapel.

== Traditions ==
=== Feria de Todos los Santos (All Saints Fair) ===
This annual fair which takes place during the days before or after 1 November, owes its origins to an important cattle fair, which used to be one of the most important cattle fairs in all of Spain. With the passage of time and the transformation of rural areas, it was named the All Saints Fair, having lost its significance as a cattle fair in favour of a popular fiesta. Currently it is one of the most important fairs in the province of Almeria, a highlight of which is the so-called 'Feria del Mediodia'. The 'Feria del Mediodia' involves the act of taking Tapas at Midday in a festive atmosphere which can continue until Midnight.

=== Feria de San Francisco (St. Francis Fair) ===
The most popular fair dedicated by the residents of La Loma to their patron saint. Various activities take place in Plaza San Francisco such as street parties and dancing. A solemn Triduum (three-day religious observation) takes place in the Parish Church of La Concepción which culminates in the crowded procession of St. Francis of Assisi.

=== Easter Week in Albox ===
For Easter Week in Albox, processions are organised by 4 cofradias and 1 prehermandad- the religious brotherhoods:- Cofradía de Ntro. Padre Jesús Nazareno, María Santísima de la Redención y Santo Sepulcro del Señor: Procession on Holy Tuesday with the statue of Jesus of Nazareth washing the feet of the disciples. Procession on Good Friday with the statues of Jesus carrying the Cross, Holy Mary of Redemption and the Holy Sepulchre.Cofradía de Ntra. Sra. de las Angustias: Procession on the evening of Good Friday with Agony in the Garden, Our Lady of Hope and Our Lady of Sorrow with her dead son in her lap. Cofradía de Ntra. Sra. de los Dolores: Procession on Good Friday of our Lady of Sorrows without the black canopy and on Holy Thursday in evening with Christ on the Cross, the Fallen Christ and our Lady of Sorrows under a black canopy. Cofradía de San Juan: Procession in the morning of Hold Friday with the statues of St. John, The Virgin of First Sorrow and Christ Crucified. Pre-Hermandad de Ntro. Padre Jesús de Pasión y Misericordia: The procession of this young brotherhood takes place on Easter Saturday with the station of the cross representing the arrest of Jesus in the Garden of Gethsemane.

=== Romería (Pilgrimage) of the Virgin of Saliente ===
A religious pilgrimage from the town of Albox to the Monastery of Saliente takes place on 8 September every year. During this pilgrimage, declared an asset of cultural interest (Bien de Interés Cultura), during the night and early morning of 8 September, hundreds of people come from all over Spain, walk, mainly via the Rambla, 18 kilometres between the town and the monastery. The considerable presence of young people gives the event a festive, as well as a religious air, at various times.

=== Chess in Albox ===
Albox has a great chess tradition. The Chess Club 'Club de Ajedrez Reverté Albox' was proclaimed the Champion Chess team in Spain in 2005. Also, Albox is considered to be the 'cradle of Spanish chess' since it celebrates a number of international chess tournaments such as "International Chess Open Vicente Bonil" and the former "Villa de Albox". Because of this international chess grand masters have visited the town, such as Veselin Topalov (FIDE world chess champion 2005) and Alekséi Dréyev (former player with Club de Ajedrez Reverté Albox).

=== Rock-Albox ===
Rock festival dating from 1985. It is celebrated annually at the end of October during the All Saints Fair. It is the longest running rock festival in Spain. Numerous local and international groups have played this festival. Some concerts attracted as many as 4,000 spectators.

== Notable people ==
- Diego Capel, footballer

== See also ==
- List of municipalities in Almería
