= Seron (disambiguation) =

Seron is one of the two settlements created immediately after the Great Flood in Jewish tradition.

Seron may also refer to:

== Places ==
- Serón, a municipality in Andalusia, Spain
- Serón de Nágima, a municipality in Castile and León, Spain
- Séron, a commune in the Hautes-Pyrénées department in south-western France

== Other ==
- Seron (surname)
- Seron Oy is a company selling and installing solar panels and battery systems in Northern Europe.
- Seron, commander of the Syrian army, who fought at the Battle of Beth Horon (166 BC)
- Seron Maxwell, a fictional character in the Japanese light novel adventure series Meg and Seron
- Phyllostylon brasiliensis, a small tropical American tree that yields Santo Domingan boxwood
- Seron or seroon: a hamper or pannier; equally, a bale or parcel wrapped in animal hide
