= Tíjola =

Tíjola, Spain
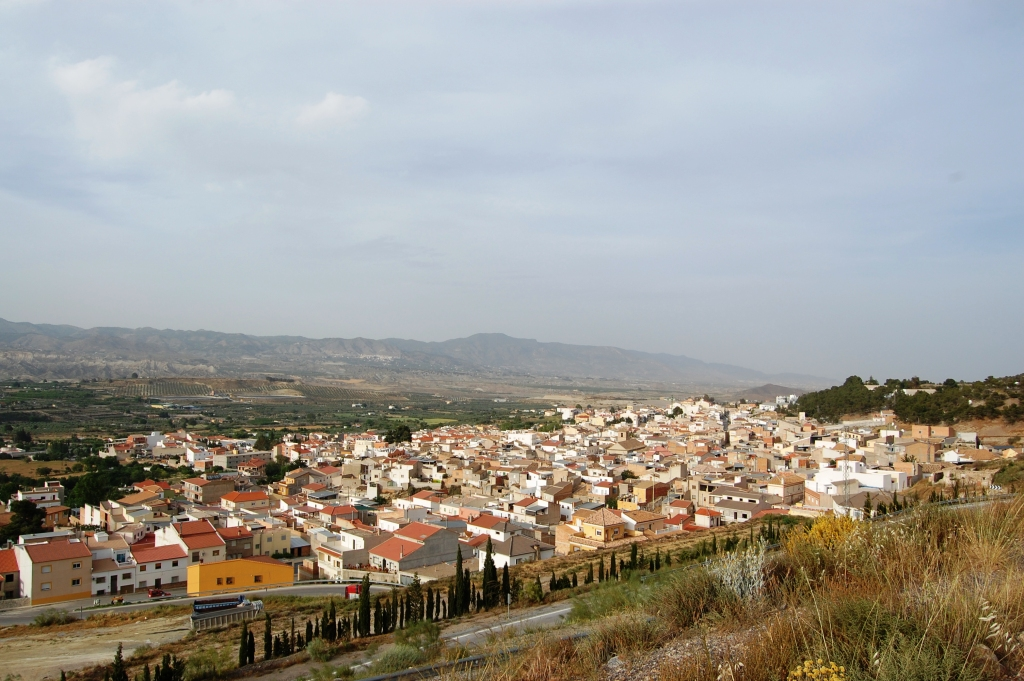
- View of Tíjola

- Flag Coat of arms
- Interactive map of Tíjola, Spain
- Coordinates: 37°20′N 2°26′W
- Country: Spain
- Autonomous Community: Andalusia
- Municipality: Almería
- Comarca: Almanzora

Area
  - Total: 70 km^{2} (27 sq mi)
- Elevation: 693 m (2,274 ft)

Population (2025-01-01)
  - Total: 3,573
  - Density: 51/km^{2} (130/sq mi)
- Time zone: UTC+1 (CET)
  - Summer (DST): UTC+2 (CEST)

Tíjola is a municipality of Almería province, in the autonomous community of Andalusia, Spain. It borders the municipalities of Lúcar, Armuña de Almanzora, Bayarque and Serón.

== History ==
Tíjola has been settled since prehistoric times, noted by found remains in the area. In antiquity, Tíjola was the Phoenician colony of Tagilit (Phoenician: 𐤕𐤂𐤋𐤕, tglt, or 𐤕𐤂𐤋𐤉𐤕, tglyt). Later, the Carthaginians colonized the territory attracted by the silver minerals in the region. The Romans came after, calling the area "Tagili", of which there are three Roman villas around the region.

During the Muslim period, during the times of Abd al-Rahman I in the 8th century, the fortress of Tachola was in the region, and by the reign of Abd al-Rahman III in the 10th century the fortress-city was called "Tájela", and later maps of the Kingdom of Granada assign it the name "Texora", and after the reconquest was known as "Tixora".

== Demographics ==
Historical population
Year	Pop.	±%
1999	3,796	—
2000	3,757	−1.0%
2001	3,787	+0.8%
2002	3,814	+0.7%
2003	3,798	−0.4%
2004	3,755	−1.1%
2005	3,820	+1.7%
Source: INE (Spain)

== See also ==
- List of municipalities in Almería
