= Pilar Acosta Martínez =

Spanish archaeologist (1938-2006)

Pilar Acosta Martinez

Pilar Acosta Martínez (Tíjola, Province of Almería, 1938 - Seville, 2006) was a Spanish prehistorian and archaeologist. She specialized in post-Palaeolithic rock art, prehistoric religions, and neolithization processes in the southern Iberian Peninsula.

== Biography ==
Pilar Acosta Martínez was the daughter of José Acosta and Presenta Martínez, both middle class teachers. She stood out since she was a girl because of her desire to learn. Her education was conducted in Tíjola in the College of the Nuns of the Sisters of Charity of San Vicente de Paúl and, later, she completed the bachelor's degree in the Institute of Secondary Education of Almería, Isabel La Católica de Madrid and Ángel Ganivet de Granada (1954).

Martinez studied history in the Faculty of Philosophy and Letters at the University of Granada where she received the Carrera Award (1954-1960). Under her advisor, Professor Alfonso Gámiz Sandoval, she completed her dissertation on "Historical-geographical review of Tíjola (Almería)", graduating cum laude.

== Selected works ==
- "La Pintura Rupestre Esquemática" (Salamanca, Universidad de Salamanca, 1968).
- "Excavaciones Arqueológicas en la Cueva de la Arena: Barranco Hondo, Tenerife" (Madrid, Patronato de la Casa de Colón, 1976).
- "La Cueva de la Dehesilla (Jerez de la Frontera): Las Primeras Civilizaciones Productoras de Andalucía Occidental" (Jerez de la Frontera, CSIC, 1990).
- "Historia de España", vol. 1 (Prehistoria, Madrid, 1986)

== Bibliography ==
- Cruz-Auñón Briones, Rosario & Ferrer Albelda, Eduardo (2009), Estudios de Prehistoria y Arqueología en homenaje a Pilar Acosta Martínez
