= Chercos =

Chercos, Spain
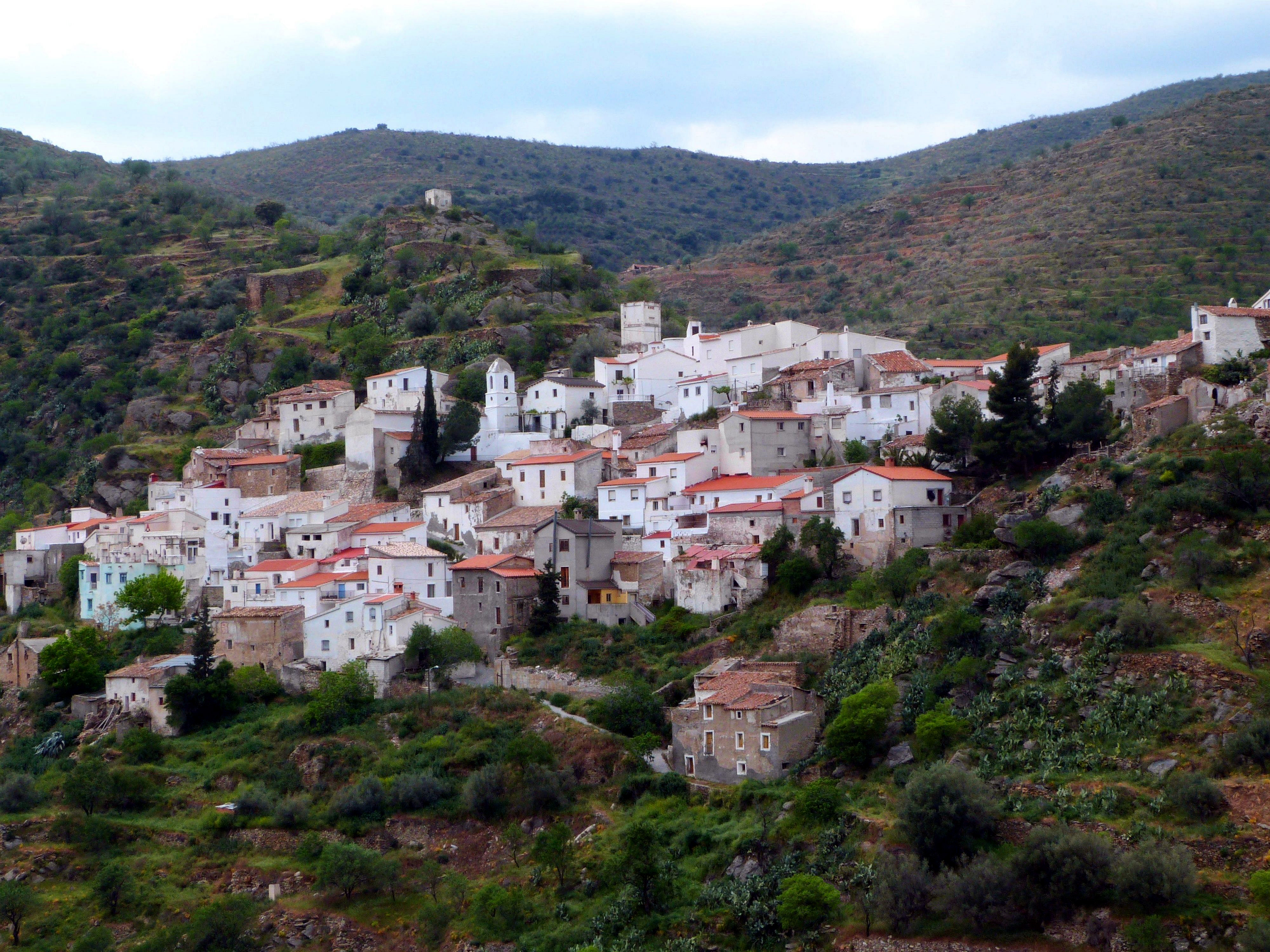
- Chercos

- Flag Coat of arms
- Interactive map of Chercos, Spain
- Coordinates: 37°15′N 2°16′W
- Country: Spain
- Community: Andalusia
- Municipality: Almería

Government
  - Mayor: José Antonio Torres Sáez (PP)

Area
  - Total: 14 km^{2} (5.4 sq mi)
- Elevation: 805 m (2,641 ft)

Population (2025-01-01)
  - Total: 301
  - Density: 22/km^{2} (56/sq mi)
- Time zone: UTC+1 (CET)
  - Summer (DST): UTC+2 (CEST)

Chercos is a municipality of Almería province, in the autonomous community of Andalusia, Spain. The original village (Chercos Viejo) lies about three kilometres south of modern-day Chercos (Chercos Nuevo), clinging to the side of the Sierra de los Filabres.

Antonio Sáez Sáez became mayor of Chercos in the 1940s and was the principal architect behind the plan to move the old town of Chercos a few kilometres away, off the isolated mountainside and onto one of the few flat spots in the Sierra de los Filabres. Chercos was by then a mere shadow of what it had once been. By the 1940s it was a village inhabited by an ever-shrinking population consisting of small landowners.

In the days when old Chercos was still a going concern, tending to the land, which over the centuries had been terraced in order to deal with the steepness of the terrain, was carried out in the same way it had been for hundreds of years, with the conservation of the scarce water resource the principal concern. The rules around the sharing of water in that arid land were those established by the Arabs centuries before. Each landowner was allocated a certain day and time of the week during which he could divert water from the common canals onto his land. This schedule and the rules attached to it were followed to the letter. Since water was so scarce and necessary a resource, anyone who dared deviate from the established norms did so at his own peril.

The golden age for Chercos came during the period of exploitation of the deposits of high quality marble found in the area. This marble was second in quality only to that found in Carrera, Italy. Those who did not work the land walked several kilometres each day to work in marble mines around Macael. As a result, money was plentiful in a village where there was no electricity or running water, and where a handful of residents forcefully resisted the move of the village to the plain below by mayor Antonio Sáez Sáez. In an effort to ensure that the village’s last and most important symbol of life, its church bells, were not removed to the new town of Chercos, two men would stay behind in the village each day while the remaining hold-outs went out into the mountains to work. Armed with rifles, they stood guard by the church, day after day. To make the situation even more explosive, Mayor Antonio imposed a tax on the landowners to help defray the costs of moving the village, a tax the landowners would not pay.

But Antonio Sáez Sáez was determined. People’s lives would be easier down on the plain, and the new town of Chercos would be far more accessible than it was on the isolated side of the mountain at the end of a rough dirt track. The landowners vehemently refused to pay what they saw as a unilaterally-imposed tax meant to carry out an objective they strongly disagreed with. In an effort to impose his authority, Mayor Antonio called in the Guardia Civil (civil guard paramilitary police) from the neighbouring town of Cóbdar. The landowners were summoned to a meeting in old Chercos. Despite the presence of the Civil Guard, Antonio was threatened by the landowners and was told that they would kill him if he persisted with his plans to tax them and move the church bells. But the mayor eventually got his way and transferred the village, if not the church bells, to the plain 3 kilometres down the mountain.

In the early 21st century, the village cobblestone streets were restored. Today, a number of homes in the former village of old Chercos are used by weekenders and summer vacationers, most with a family link to the village. As of 2020, two brothers were the last remaining permanent residents of old Chercos; new Chercos had a population of about 300 people.

== Demographics ==
Historical population
Year	Pop.	±%
1999	252	—
2000	227	−9.9%
2001	297	+30.8%
2002	222	−25.3%
2003	233	+5.0%
2004	286	+22.7%
2005	295	+3.1%
Source: INE (Spain)

== See also ==
- List of municipalities in Almería
