= Suflí =

- Municipality
- Flag Coat of arms
- Interactive map of Suflí
- Coordinates: 37°20′N 2°23′W
- Country: Spain
- Autonomous Community: Andalusia
- Municipality: Almería
- Comarca: Almanzora

Government
  - Mayor: Juan Cuevas Sáez (PSOE)

Area
  - Total: 10 km^{2} (3.9 sq mi)
- Elevation: 634 m (2,080 ft)

Population (2025-01-01)
  - Total: 224
  - Density: 22/km^{2} (58/sq mi)
- Time zone: UTC+1 (CET)
  - Summer (DST): UTC+2 (CEST)

Suflí is a municipality of Almería province, in the autonomous community of Andalusia, Spain. Suflí is known for a product of tomatoes and peppers that's roasted and bottled in a nearby factory called fritá.

== Demographics ==
Historical population
Year	Pop.	±%
1999	249	—
2000	256	+2.8%
2001	251	−2.0%
2002	255	+1.6%
2003	242	−5.1%
2004	234	−3.3%
2005	260	+11.1%
Source: INE (Spain)

== See also ==
- List of municipalities in Almería
