= Somontín =

- Municipality
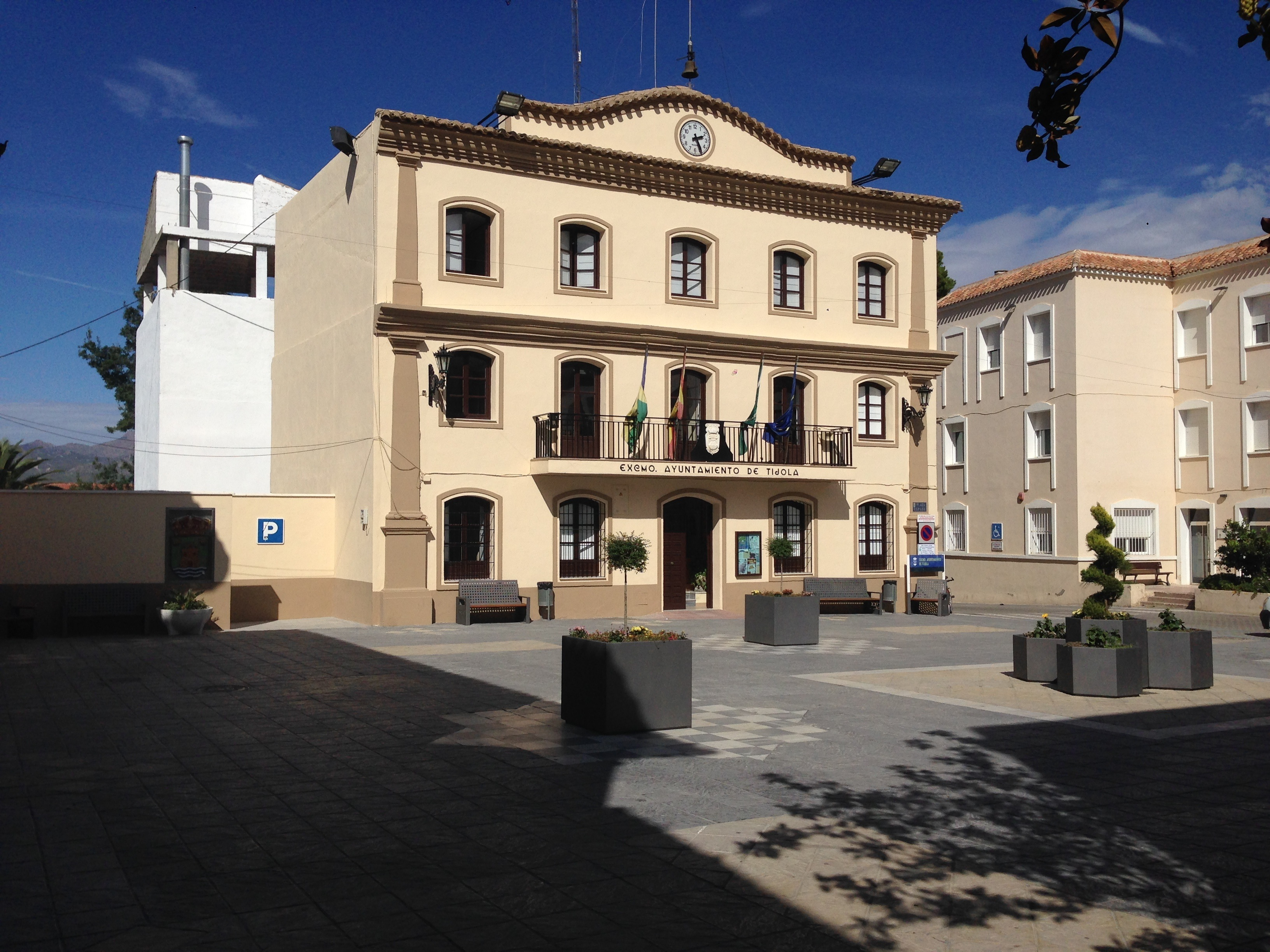
- Town hall

- Flag Coat of arms
- Interactive map of Somontín
- Coordinates: 37°23′N 2°23′W
- Country: Spain
- Autonomous Community: Andalusia
- Municipality: Almería
- Comarca: Almanzora

Government
  - Mayor: Ramón Rueda Sánchez (PP)

Area
  - Total: 19 km^{2} (7.3 sq mi)
- Elevation: 830 m (2,720 ft)

Population (2025-01-01)
  - Total: 497
  - Density: 26/km^{2} (68/sq mi)
- Time zone: UTC+1 (CET)
  - Summer (DST): UTC+2 (CEST)

Somontín is a municipality of Almería province, in the autonomous community of Andalusia, Spain.

== Demographics ==
Historical population
Year	Pop.	±%
1999	492	—
2000	509	+3.5%
2001	506	−0.6%
2002	508	+0.4%
2003	501	−1.4%
2004	530	+5.8%
2005	515	−2.8%
Source: INE (Spain)

== See also ==
- List of municipalities in Almería
