= Antonio Cano Gea =

Spanish photographer and journalist (1917–1987)

Antonio Cano Gea (1917–1987) was a Spanish naturalist, photographer and journalist. He was born in Serón (Almería province, Andalusia) in 1917 and died in Almería in 1987.

== Photography, expeditions and media ==
In 1948 Cano began to develop an interest in the photography of nature, devoting himself to taking pictures of landscapes and animals. In 1957 he joined the Spanish Ornithological Society. Along with José Antonio Valverde (chairman of the Ornithological society and partner on multiple future projects) Cano participated in expeditions around the Doñana National Park and the Sierra de Cazorla, where he discovered an endemic species of lizard, Latin name Algiroides marchi, and spotted species of ospreys. The pictures taken of the ospreys, their offspring and nests, earned him the gold medal of the Conseil International de la Chasse (CIC International Game Council), held at that time in Austria.

In 1961 he explored zoological documentary cinema, working with various media, including Spanish Television. Already occupying the post of correspondent, he collaborated between the state-owned channel and Félix Rodríguez de la Fuente for the creation of the famous program El hombre y la tierra (Man and the earth).

== Work in Almería ==
Antonio Cano Gea was also a devoted admirer and preserver of nature in his native Almeria. He was one of the first to warn of the problems faced by the biologically rich Albufera de Adra wetlands west of the Almeria coast, due to pressure from intensive farming. His calls for protection for the space, currently a Natural Park, was unsuccessful in his time. Similarly, he was one of the first to become interested in the Punta Entinas salt marshes, currently the Punta Entinas-Sabinar National Park. The study methods followed by Cano were the basis for further investigations by José Antonio Valverde in Doñana.

His work, however, reached its peak in 1971 onwards, when, in collaboration with Valverde, he created the La Hoya Nature Reserve, on a farm owned by the CSIC, located in the neighborhood of that name, towards the back of the citadel of the Almeria capital. Valverde and Cano, particularly sensitive about the little-studied situation of the North African gazelle species, such as the dorcas gazelle (Gazella dorcas neglecta) and the dama gazelle or springbok Mohor (Gazella dama), decided to undertake captive breeding, a successful pioneering act at the time. It was the Spanish Army who assisted in the capture of the species required in the Sahara Desert. In 1975 the Natural Reserve became the Saharan Wildlife Rescue Park, under the umbrella of the Ministry of Education and Science and the Arid Zone Experimental Station of Almeria. The Park performs an important task of breeding and reintroduction of species of North African gazelles, including the above plus other species such as Cuvier's gazelle (Gazella cuvieri) and aoudad Sahara (Ammotragus lervia sahariensis).

== Recognition ==
Cano's efforts have been recognized by organizations such as the National Geographic Society, of which was a member or the WWF / Adena.

== Bibliography ==
- Los Cien Almerienses del siglo XX, en La Voz de Almería (One Hundred Almeríans of the twentieth century, in Voice of Almería)
- Homenaje a Antonio Cano Gea. Almería : Instituto de Estudios Almerienses. Diputación Provincial, 1988 437 p. il. (Tribute to Antonio Cano Gea. Almerían Studies Institute. County Council)
- López Martos, José Manuel: Artículo sobre Antonio Cano Gea en Boletín del Instituto de Estudios Almerienses. Ciencias, ISSN 1133-1488, Nº. 9-10, 1990‑1991, pags. 173-199 (Article on Antonio Cano Gea in Bulletin of the Institute of Almerian studies)
- Grupo Ecologista Mediterráneo: Homenaje a Antonio Cano Gea, en el Boletín del Instituto de Estudios Almerienses. Ciencias, ISSN 1133-1488, Nº. Extra 6, 1988, pags. 411-412 (Mediterranean Ecological Group: A tribute to Antonio Cano Gea, in Bulletin of the Institute of Almerian studies)
