= Urrácal =

- Municipality
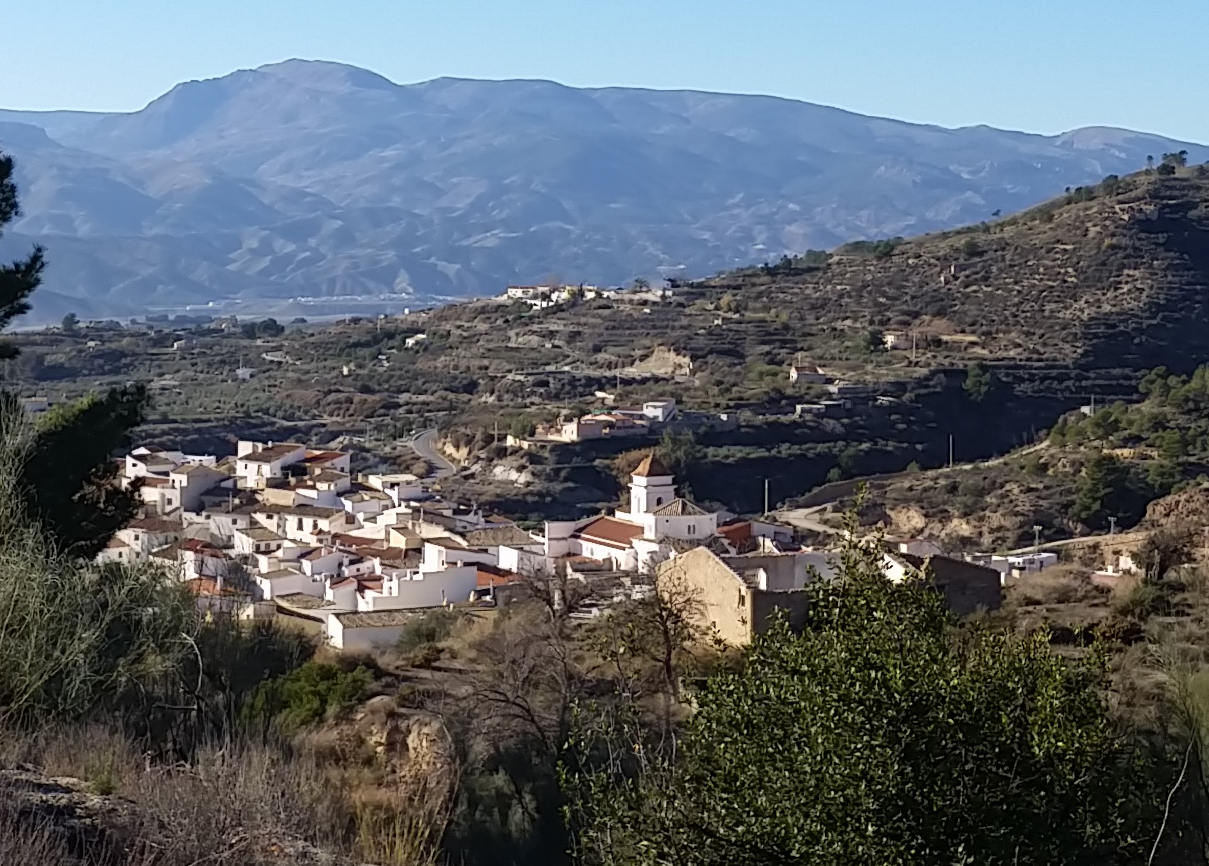
- Urrácal

- Flag Coat of arms
- Interactive map of Urrácal
- Coordinates: 37°24′N 2°22′W
- Country: Spain
- Autonomous Community: Andalusia
- Municipality: Almería
- Comarca: Almanzora

Government
  - Mayor: Juan Oliver Acosta (PdeAl)

Area
  - Total: 25 km^{2} (9.7 sq mi)
- Elevation: 744 m (2,441 ft)

Population (2025-01-01)
  - Total: 340
  - Density: 14/km^{2} (35/sq mi)
- Time zone: UTC+1 (CET)
  - Summer (DST): UTC+2 (CEST)

Urrácal is a municipality of Almería province, in the autonomous community of Andalusia, Spain.

== Demographics ==
Historical population
Year	Pop.	±%
1999	332	—
2000	349	+5.1%
2001	341	−2.3%
2002	338	−0.9%
2003	330	−2.4%
2004	350	+6.1%
2005	353	+0.9%
Source: INE (Spain)

== See also ==
- List of municipalities in Almería
