= Calar Alto Observatory =

Observatory in Almería, Spain

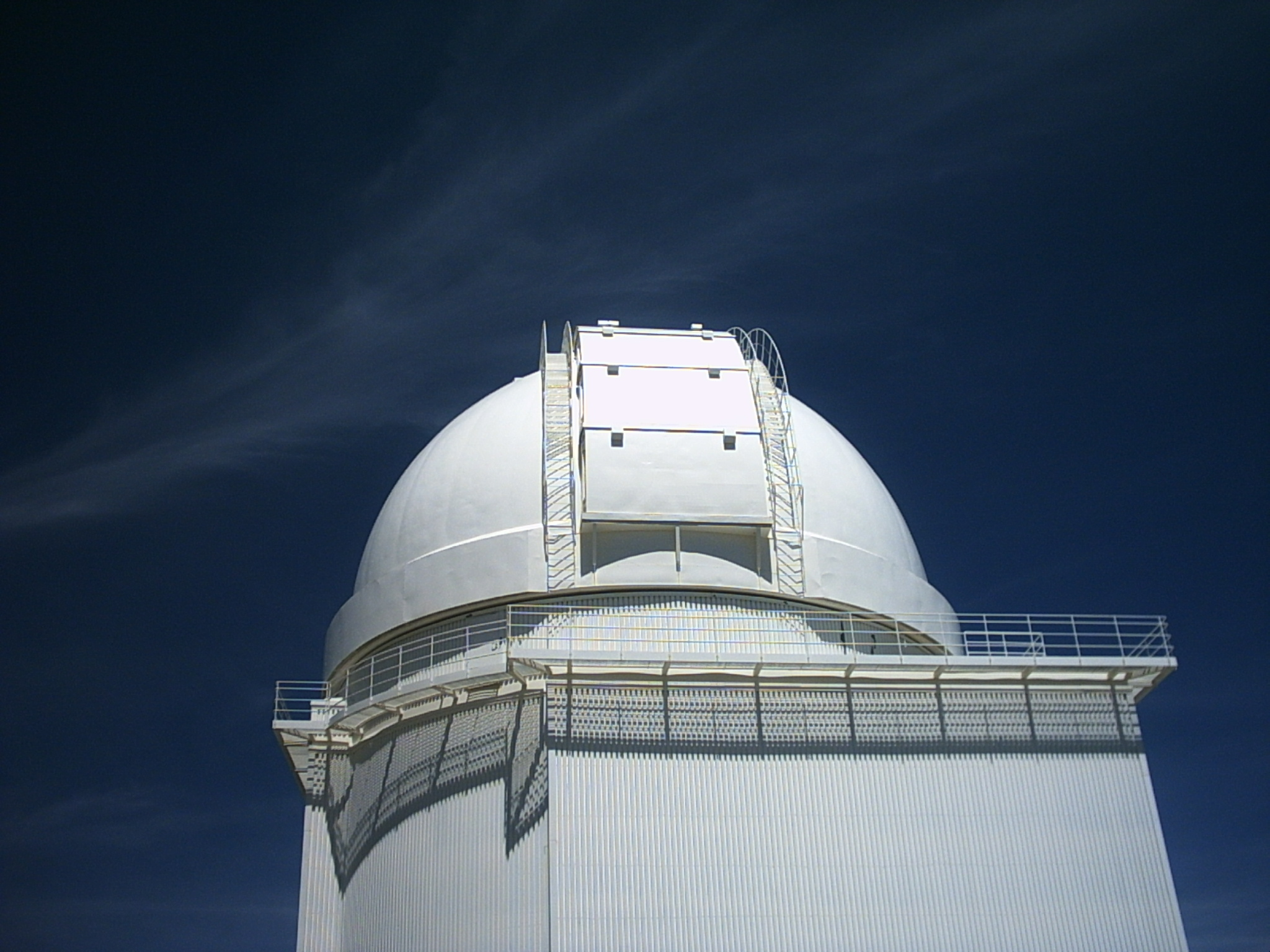
- Enclosure of the 2.2-meter telescope at Calar Alto Observatory
- Alternative names: Spanish Astronomical Centre in Andalusia
- Organization: Institute of Astrophysics of Andalusia; Regional Government of Andalusia
- Observatory code: 493
- Location: Almería, Spain
- Coordinates: 37°13′25″N 2°32′46″W
- Altitude: 2,168 m (7,113 ft)
- Website: www.caha.es

Telescopes
- Unnamed: 3.5 m reflector 37.220791°N 2.5468465°W
- Unnamed: 2.2 m reflector 37.2231427°N 2.5461943°W
- Unnamed: 1.5 m reflector 37.2249718°N 2.5484985°W
- Unnamed: 1.23 m reflector 37.223074°N 2.5476775°W
- Unnamed: 0.8 m Schmidt reflector 37.223927°N 2.5483678°W
- Related media on Commons

Minor planets discovered: 7
see § List of discovered minor planets

The Calar Alto Observatory (Centro Astronómico Hispano en Andalucía or "Spanish Astronomical Centre in Andalusia") is an astronomical observatory located in Almería province in Spain on Calar Alto, a 2,168-meter-high (7,113 ft) mountain in the Sierra de Los Filabres subrange of the Sierra Nevada.

Until 2018, Calar Alto was owned and operated jointly by the German Max Planck Institute for Astronomy in Heidelberg, and the Spanish Institute of Astrophysics of Andalusia (IAA-CSIC) in Granada. It was named the "German–Spanish Astronomical Centre" (in Spanish, Centro Astronómico Hispano-Alemán (CAHA); in German, Deutsch-Spanisches Astronomisches Zentrum). In 2019, the Council of Andalusia takes over the German partner, sharing the observatory with the Spanish National Research Council through its head institute, IAA-CSIC.

Calar Alto telescopes are used for a broad range of observations, from objects in the Solar System to cosmology, including the search for exoplanets.

The 3.5-meter telescope is the largest telescope in mainland Europe, though there are three larger telescopes on the Spanish island of La Palma at the Roque de los Muchachos Observatory. The minor planet 189202 Calar Alto, discovered by Felix Hormuth at Starkenburg Observatory in 2003, was named in honor of the observatory site.

== History ==
The observatory was proposed in 1970 and officially opened in July 1975 with the commissioning of its 1.23-metre (48 in) telescope. The facility developed through German–Spanish cooperation in astronomy, and over time four additional telescopes were brought into operation. The Schmidt telescope was moved to Calar Alto in 1976 from the Hamburg Observatory at Bergedorf, where it had been completed in 1954. The observatory hosted the finish of Stage 11 of the 2017 Vuelta a España cycling race (the stage was won by Miguel Ángel López), having previously hosted stage finishes in 2004 (won by eventual race champion Roberto Heras) and 2006 (won by Igor Antón). Calar Alto was climbed on Stage 9 of the Vuelta (AUG 2021).

== Geography ==
The Calar Alto Observatory is located in Almería province in Spain on Calar Alto, a 2,168-meter-high (7,113 ft) mountain in the Sierra de Los Filabres subrange of the Sierra Nevada.

=== Climate ===
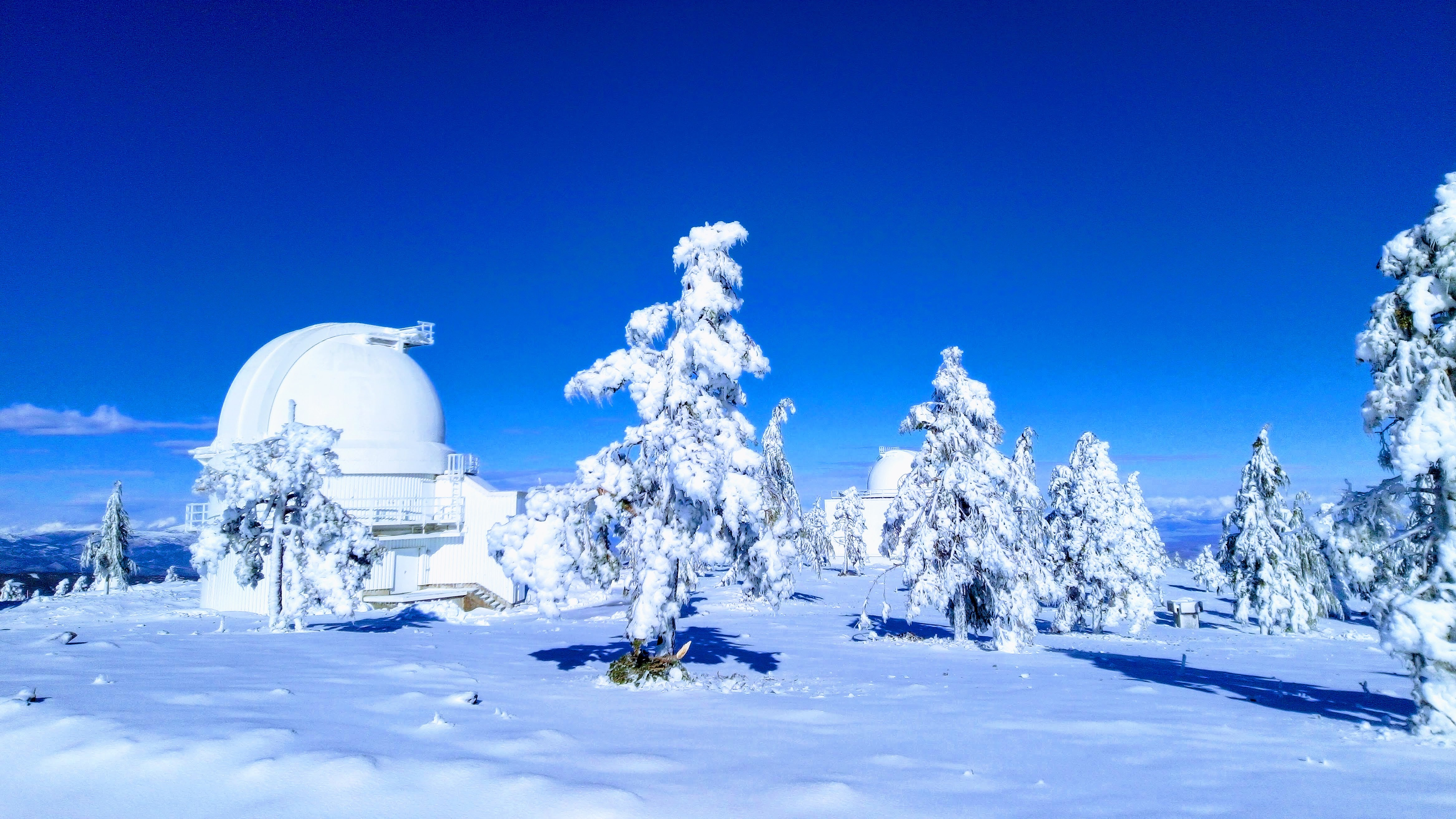
Calar Alto completely snowed after the Storm Filomena in January 2021.

According to the Köppen climate classification, the Calar Alto Observatory has a Mediterranean climate (Csa/Csb) with strong influences of a humid continental climate (Dsa/Dsb), with hot summers and cold winters. Calar Alto has one of the most continental climates in Spain: both the temperatures of 40 °C (104 °F), which is very close to the hottest temperature ever recorded in the province of Almería (after the Tabernas Desert), and −20 °C (−4 °F), which is the coldest temperature ever recorded in the province of Almería, both of which are recorded here. Precipitation is higher during winter, and lower during summer.

== Equipment ==
There are 4 main telescopes on site: a 3.5-meter (138-inch), 2.2 m (87 in), and a 1.23 m (48 in) telescope, and an 80 cm (31 in) Schmidt reflector. The 3.5-meter is the largest telescope on European soil with an equatorial mount. There is also a 1.52 m (60 in) telescope that is owned and operated by the Spanish National Observatory and a robotic telescope operated by the Spanish Astrobiology Center (CAB).

== Work ==
=== CALIFA survey ===
The CALIFA survey (Calar Alto Legacy Integral Field Area survey) is an astronomical project to map 600 galaxies with imaging spectroscopy (integral field spectroscopy (IFS)).

=== CARMENES survey ===
The CARMENES survey (Calar Alto high-Resolution search for M-dwarfs with Exoearths with Near-infrared and optical Échelle Spectrographs) is a project to examine approximately 300 M-dwarf stars for signs of exoplanets with the CARMENES instrument on Calar Alto's 3.5m telescope. Operating since 2016, it aims to find Earth-sized exoplanets around 2 M_{🜨} (Earth masses) using Doppler spectroscopy (also called the radial velocity method).

== List of discovered minor planets ==
Close to a hundred minor planets have been discovered at Calar Alto by astronomers Luboš Kohoutek, Kurt Birkle, Ulrich Hopp, Johann Baur, Krisztián Sárneczky, Gyula Szabó, Felix Hormuth and Hermann Boehnhardt. In addition, the Minor Planet Center, directly credits "Calar Alto" with the discovery of the following minor planets:

Object	Discovery Date	
(63429) 2001 MH_{5}	21 June 2001	list
(94223) 2001 BU_{53}	17 January 2001	list
(99258) 2001 MF_{5}	21 June 2001	list
124143 Joséluiscorral	21 June 2001	list
213269 Angelbarbero	20 June 2001	list
(247170) 2001 BY_{10}	16 January 2001	list
(250482) 2004 DF_{79}	18 February 2004	list

== See also ==
- List of largest optical reflecting telescopes
- List of largest optical telescopes in the 20th century
- Cerro Tololo Inter-American Observatory
- La Silla Observatory
- List of minor planet discoverers
- Llano de Chajnantor Observatory
- Paranal Observatory
- Very Large Telescope
