= Zurgena =

- Municipality
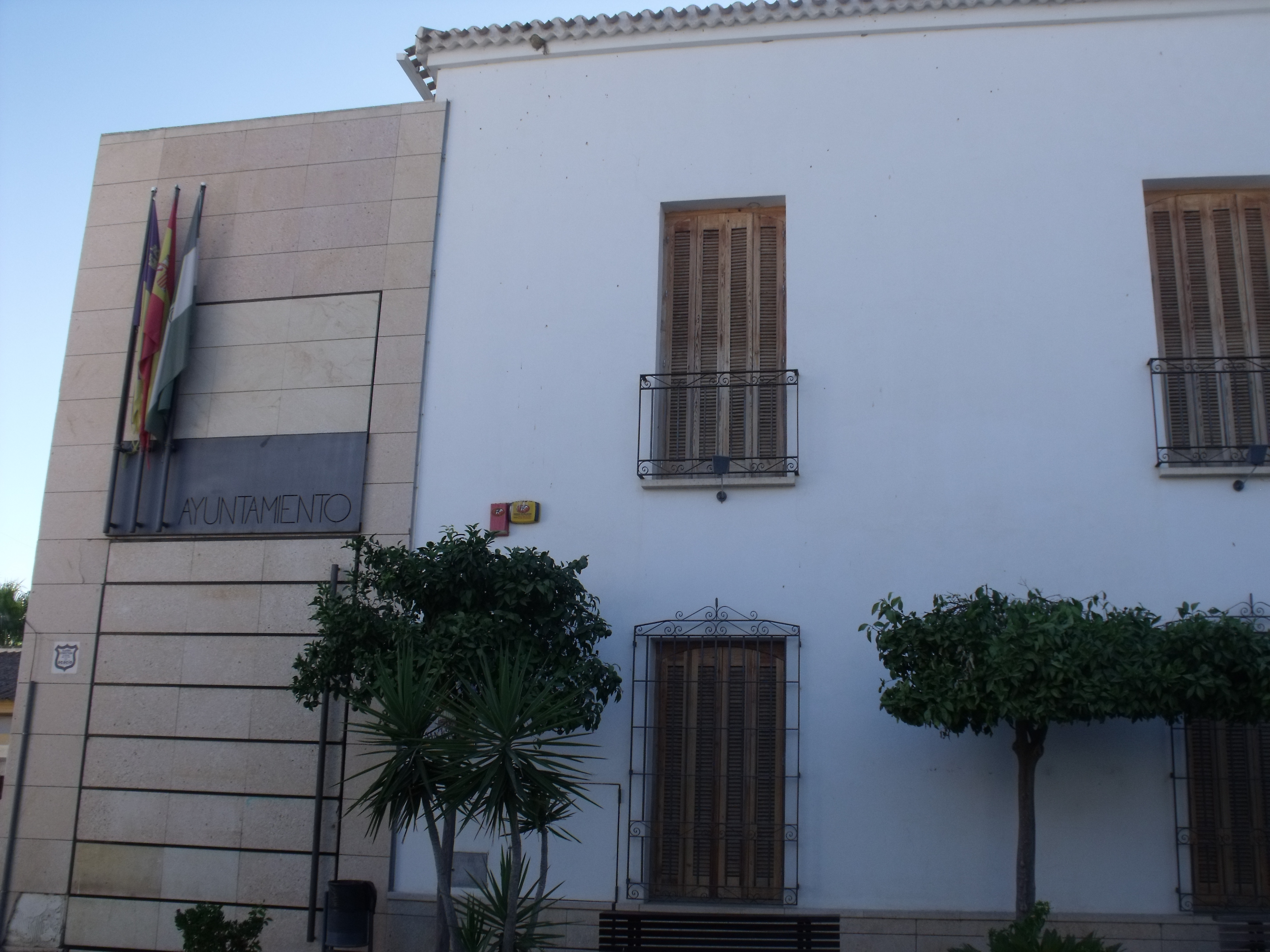
- Town hall

- Flag Coat of arms

- Location of Zurgena within the Province of Almería Location of Zurgena within Andalusia Location of Zurgena within Spain
- Coordinates: 37°20′N 2°02′W
- Country: Spain
- Community: Andalusia
- Province: Almería
- Comarca: Almanzora

Government
  - Alcalde (Mayor): Luis Díaz García (PSOE)

Area
  - Total: 72 km^{2} (28 sq mi)
- Elevation: 248 m (814 ft)

Population (2025-01-01)
  - Total: 3,059
  - Density: 42/km^{2} (110/sq mi)
- (INE)
- Demonym(s): Zurgenera, Zurgenero
- Time zone: UTC+1 (CET)
  - Summer (DST): UTC+2 (CEST)

Zurgena is a municipality of Almería province, in the autonomous community of Andalusia, Spain.

== Demographics ==
Historical population
Year	Pop.	±%
1999	2,079	—
2000	2,079	+0.0%
2001	2,099	+1.0%
2002	2,140	+2.0%
2003	2,184	+2.1%
2004	2,253	+3.2%
2005	2,288	+1.6%
2006	2,461	+7.6%
2007	2,713	+10.2%
2008	2,986	+10.1%
2009	3,066	+2.7%
2010	3,060	−0.2%
2011	3,133	+2.4%
2012	3,184	+1.6%
2013	3,201	+0.5%
2014	3,129	−2.2%
2015	3,030	−3.2%
2016	2,939	−3.0%
2017	2,877	−2.1%
Source: INE (Spain)

== See also ==
- List of municipalities in Almería
