= Armuña de Almanzora =

- Municipality
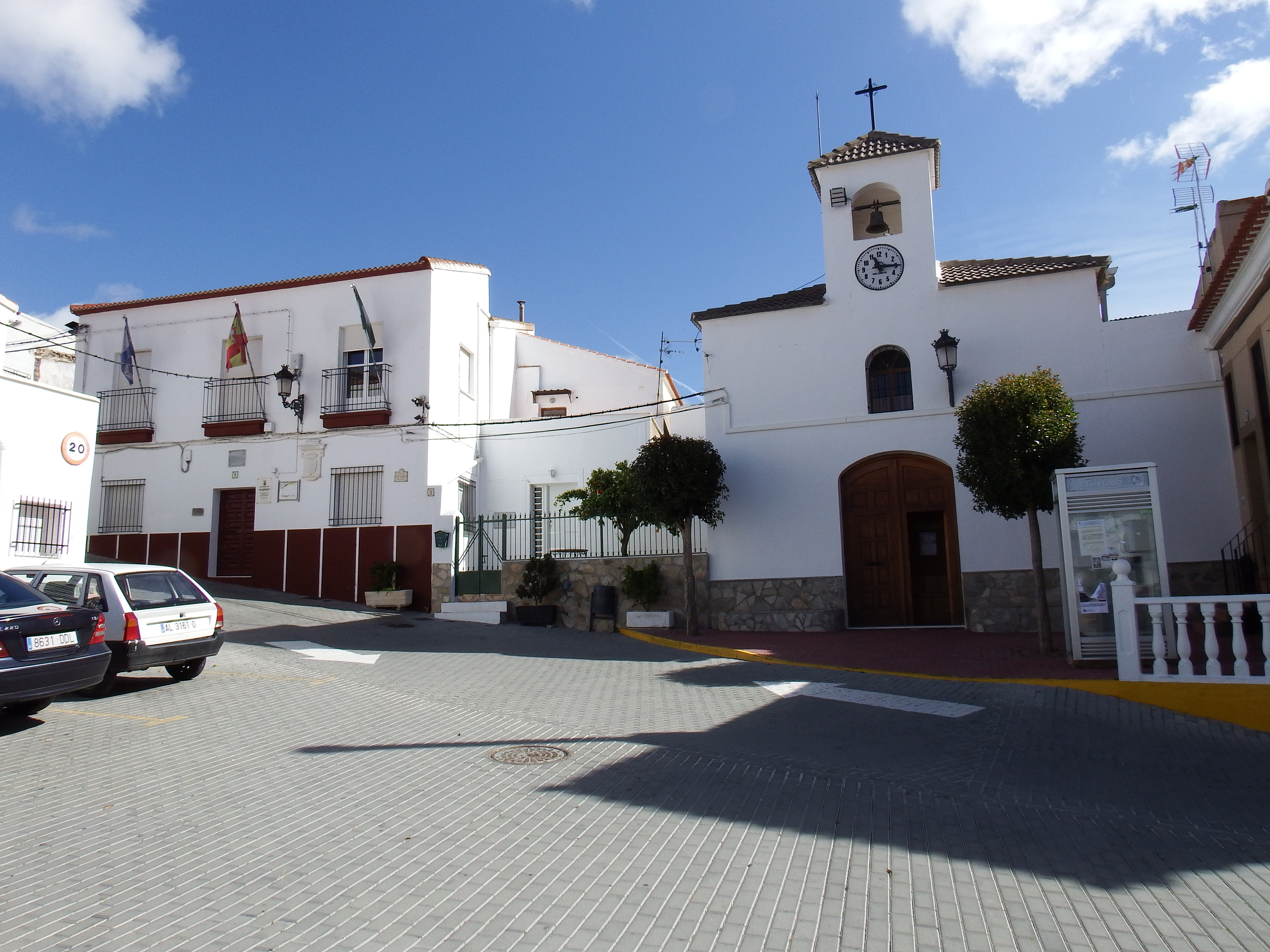

- Flag Coat of arms

- Location of Armuña de Almanzora within the Province of Almería Location of Armuña de Almanzora within Andalusia Location of Armuña de Almanzora within Spain
- Coordinates: 37°21′N 2°24′W
- Country: Spain
- Community: Andalusia
- Province: Almería
- Comarca: Almanzora

Government
  - Alcalde (Mayor): José Berruezo Padilla (PSOE)

Area
  - Total: 8 km^{2} (3.1 sq mi)
- Elevation: 624 m (2,047 ft)

Population (2025-01-01)
  - Total: 371
  - Density: 46/km^{2} (120/sq mi)
- (INE)
- Time zone: UTC+1 (CET)
  - Summer (DST): UTC+2 (CEST)

Armuña de Almanzora is a municipality of Almería province, in the autonomous community of Andalusia, Spain.

== Demographics ==
Historical population
Year	Pop.	±%
1999	324	—
2000	322	−0.6%
2001	327	+1.6%
2002	327	+0.0%
2003	303	−7.3%
2004	310	+2.3%
2005	322	+3.9%
Source: INE (Spain)

== See also ==
- List of municipalities in Almería
