= Sierro =

- Municipality
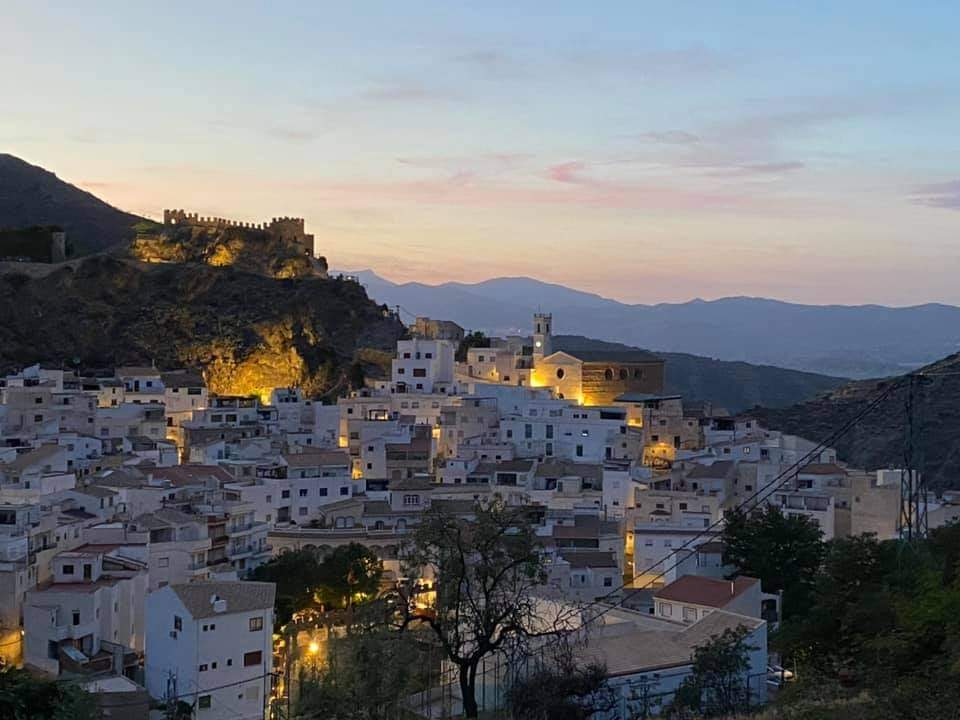
- Sierro

- Flag Coat of arms
- Interactive map of Sierro
- Coordinates: 37°19′N 2°24′W
- Country: Spain
- Autonomous Community: Andalusia
- Municipality: Almería
- Comarca: Almanzora

Government
  - Mayor: Ángel José Lozano Rubio

Area
  - Total: 28 km^{2} (11 sq mi)
- Elevation: 755 m (2,477 ft)

Population (2025-01-01)
  - Total: 364
  - Density: 13/km^{2} (34/sq mi)
- Time zone: UTC+1 (CET)
  - Summer (DST): UTC+2 (CEST)

Sierro is a municipality of Almería province, in the autonomous community of Andalusia, Spain, It is located in the valley of the River Sierro in the 'Comarca del Mármol', county of the marble. The name 'Sierro' seems to come from the Latin 'serra' meaning mountain range.

== Description ==
The village is now mainly populated by descendants of people from Murcia and Albacete, with a few from Castile and the rest from Andalusia. In the 15th century it was possible to distinguish between High and Low Sierro. The village is wedged into a narrow valley. The first road into Sierro was built by Francisco Jimenez Ontiveros, a prominent engineer of the 1930s and 1940s (head of Renfe) and native of Sierro. It was built on supports affixed to the side of the mountain. Francisco Jimenez Ontiveros, engineer and lawyer, belonged to Sierro's most prominent family, which included his brother, Federico Jimenez Ontiveros, a medical doctor, hospital director in Seville, and General in the Spanish Air Force. The then-family home dominates the fountain square in the village and has a plaque dedicated to Federico. Above this plaque is another dedicated to his father, Jose Jimenez Sanchez. The family owned seven cortijos (agricultural farms), a mill, and several plots of land that included olive trees, almond trees and orange trees. It also had a long history of municipal service with family members serving as mayors and town secretaries. Despite their influence in the village through the 19th century and first half of the 20th century, only one Jimenez Ontiveros descendant and his family remained in Sierro by the 21st century.

== Demographics ==
Historical population
Year	Pop.	±%
1999	484	—
2000	471	−2.7%
2001	472	+0.2%
2002	452	−4.2%
2003	452	+0.0%
2004	452	+0.0%
2005	457	+1.1%
Source: INE (Spain)

== See also ==
- List of municipalities in Almería
