= Cóbdar =

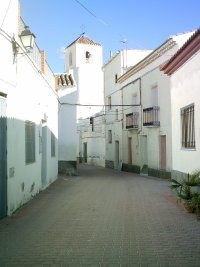

- Coat of arms

- Location of Cóbdar within the Province of Almería Location of Cóbdar within Andalusia Location of Cóbdar within Spain
- Coordinates: 37°15′N 2°12′W
- Country: Spain
- Community: Andalusia
- Province: Almería
- Comarca: Almanzora

Government
  - Mayor: José Fuentes Fernández (PSOE)

Area
  - Total: 32 km^{2} (12 sq mi)
- Elevation: 605 m (1,985 ft)

Population (2025-01-01)
  - Total: 169
  - Density: 5.3/km^{2} (14/sq mi)
- (INE)
- Demonym(s): Riblanco, Riblanca
- Time zone: UTC+1 (CET)
  - Summer (DST): UTC+2 (CEST)

Cóbdar (Spanish pronunciation: [ˈkoβðaɾ], local: [ˈkɔdːæ̞]) is a municipality of Almería province, in the autonomous community of Andalusia, Spain.

== Demographics ==
Historical population
| Year | Pop. | ±% |
|---|---|---|
| 1999 | 296 | — |
| 2000 | 300 | +1.4% |
| 2001 | 221 | −26.3% |
| 2002 | 292 | +32.1% |
| 2003 | 286 | −2.1% |
| 2004 | 242 | −15.4% |
| 2005 | 210 | −13.2% |
| 2018 | 143 | −31.9% |
Source: INE (Spain)

== See also ==
- List of municipalities in Almería
