= Taberno =

- Municipality
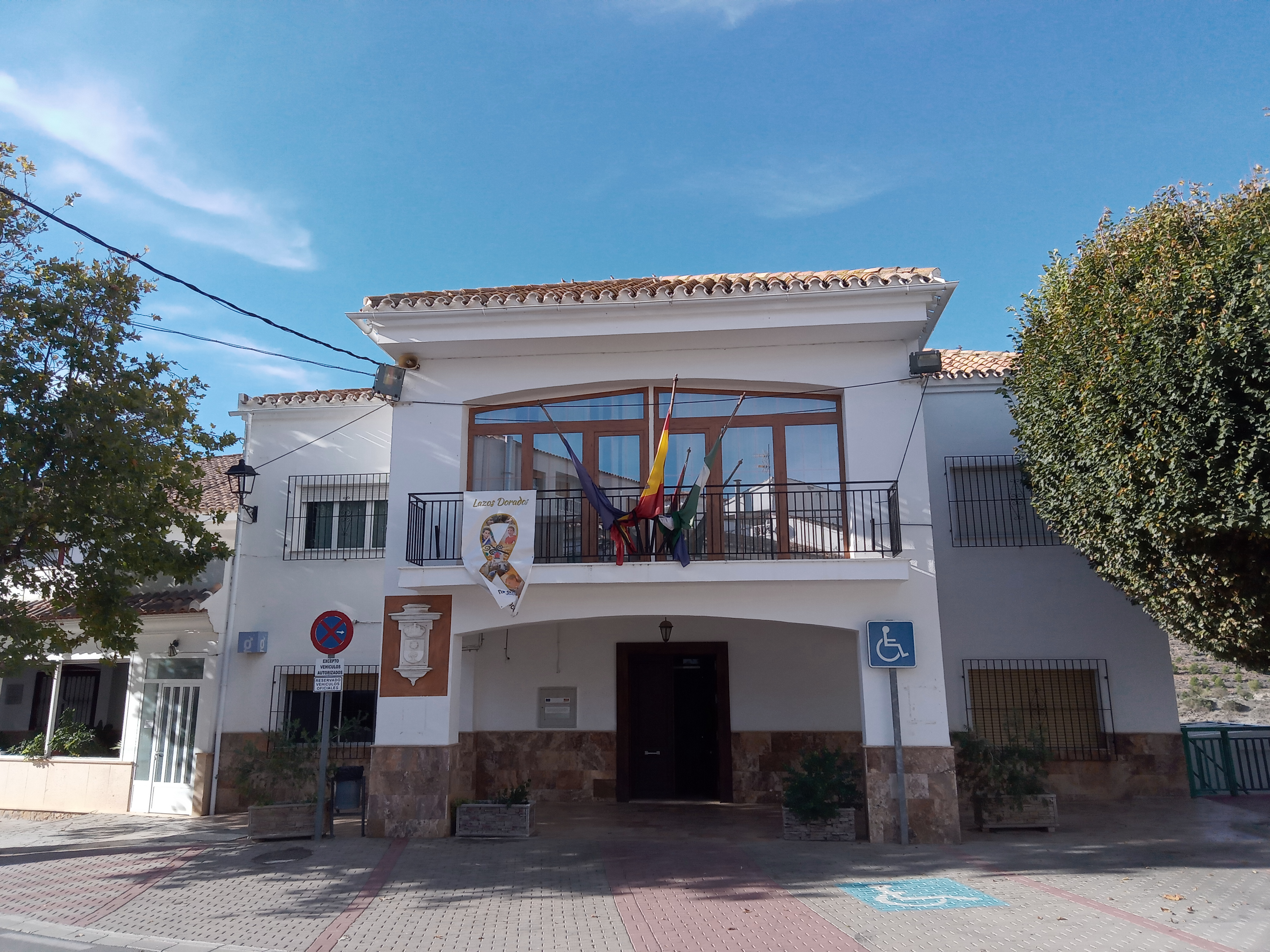
- Town hall

- Flag Coat of arms

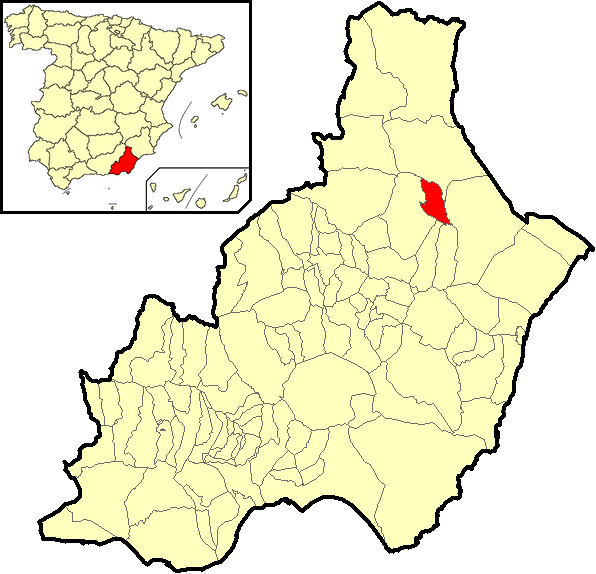
- Location in Almería
- Coordinates: 37°28′N 2°04′W
- Country: Spain
- Autonomous Community: Andalusia
- Municipality: Almería
- Comarca: Almanzora

Government
  - Alcalde (Mayor): Antonio Martos Sanchez (PP)

Area
  - Total: 44 km^{2} (17 sq mi)
- Elevation: 704 m (2,310 ft)

Population (2025-01-01)
  - Total: 955
  - Density: 22/km^{2} (56/sq mi)
- Time zone: UTC+1 (CET)
  - Summer (DST): UTC+2 (CEST)

Taberno is a municipality of Almería province, in the autonomous community of Andalusia, Spain.

== Demographics ==
Historical population
Year	Pop.	±%
1999	1,002	—
2000	974	−2.8%
2001	990	+1.6%
2002	1,012	+2.2%
2003	1,032	+2.0%
2004	1,081	+4.7%
2005	1,085	+0.4%
2018	963	−11.2%
Source: INE (Spain)

== See also ==
- List of municipalities in Almería
