= Arboleas =

- Municipality
- Flag Seal

- Location within Spain
- Coordinates: 37°21′01.4″N 2°04′37.9″W
- Country: Spain
- A. community: Andalucía
- Province: Almería

Government
  - Mayor: José Juan Ramos

Area
  - Total: 66.14 km^{2} (25.54 sq mi)

Population (January 1, 2025)
  - Total: 4,182
  - Density: 63.23/km^{2} (163.8/sq mi)
- Time zone: UTC+01:00
- Postal code: 04660
- MCN: 04017
- Website: Official website

Arboleas is a municipality of Almería province, in the autonomous community of Andalusia, Spain.

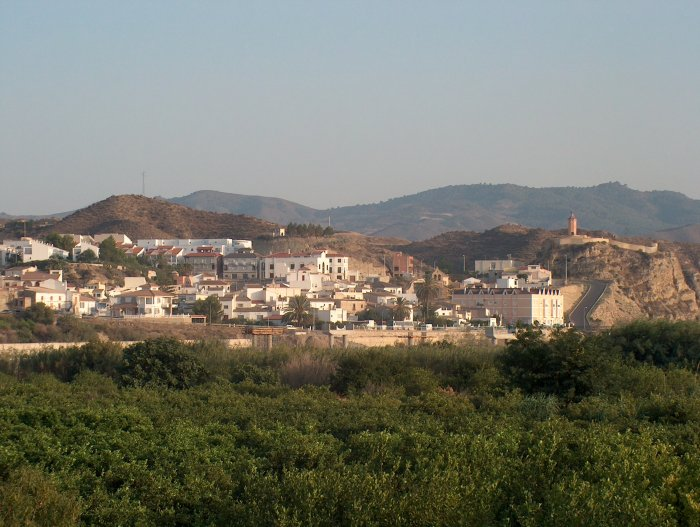
View of Arboleas

Found in the Almanzora valley, Arboleas is a small town on the bank of the now dryAlmanzora River, in the spurs of the Sierra de los Filabres.

It has a strong agricultural economy growing citrus, olive trees, almond trees and cereals such as wheat and barley.

Historical population
Year	Pop.	±%
1999	1,540	—
2000	1,540	+0.0%
2001	1,615	+4.9%
2002	1,782	+10.3%
2003	2,000	+12.2%
2004	2,310	+15.5%
2005	2,819	+22.0%
2017	4,463	+58.3%
Source: INE (Spain)

- Distance to the capital (km): 120
- Local Inhabitants: Arboleanos
- Number of Inhabitants: 1540
- Postal Code: 04660

The village of Arboleas is situated on the riverbank in the Almanzora valley, one of many small settlements along the course of the (now dry) Almanzora river, which once watered the fertile plain. It has a strong agricultural economy, producing citrus fruit, olives, almonds and cereals. Its history can be traced back to prehistoric times, through to the Romans, Moors and Christians, though the origins of the present village are medieval.

== Places of interest ==
- Church of Santiago, late 19th century
- Torre de Arboleas, possibly a 15th-century watchtower, now a clock
- The bridge over the river

== Festivals ==
- Santa Ana, 26 July
- San Roque, 15 August
- Virgen del Pilar, 12 October
- Patron Saint festivities, last Sunday in October

== See also ==
- List of municipalities in Almería
