= Cantoria =

Cantoria, Spain
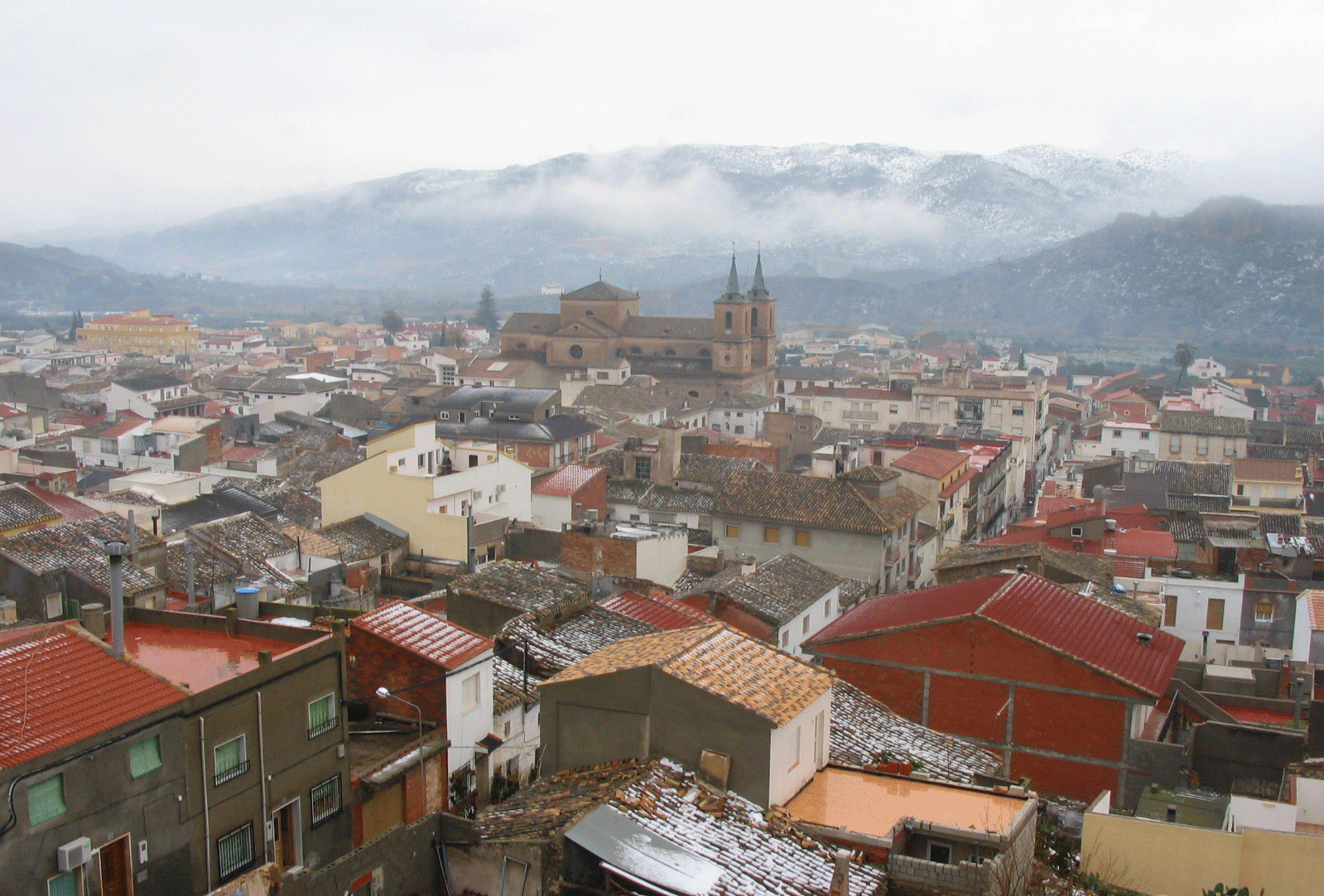
- View of Cantoria

- Coat of arms
- Interactive map of Cantoria, Spain
- Coordinates: 37°21′N 2°11′W
- Country: Spain
- Province: Almería

Government
  - Mayor: Puri Sanchez (PSOE)

Area
  - Total: 79 km^{2} (31 sq mi)
- Elevation: 382 m (1,253 ft)

Population (2025-01-01)
  - Total: 3,592
  - Density: 45/km^{2} (120/sq mi)
- Time zone: UTC+1 (CET)
  - Summer (DST): UTC+2 (CEST)

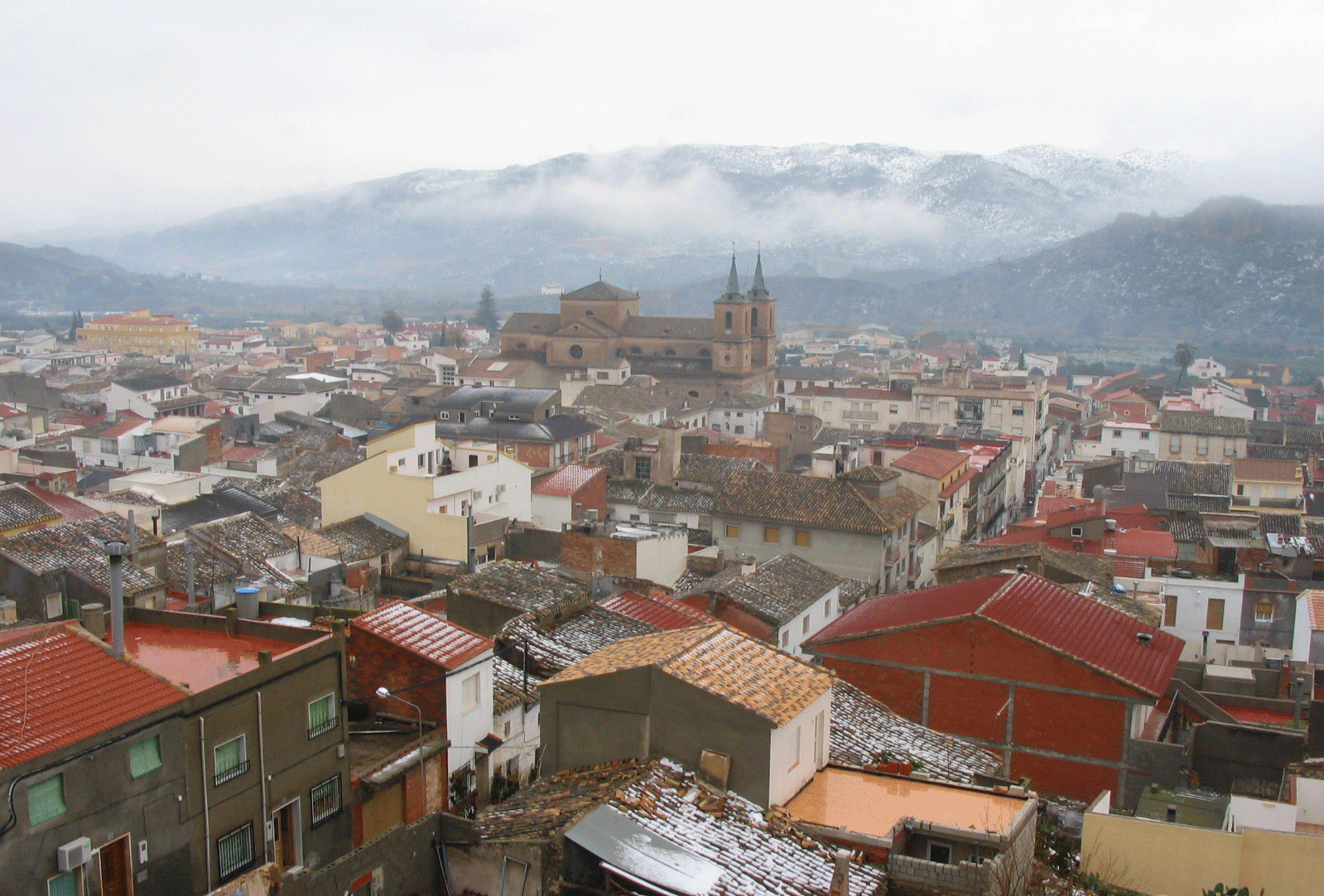
Cantoria, view from the single spire church over the rooftops

Cantoria is a municipality of Almería province, in the autonomous community of Andalusia, Spain.

== Demographics ==
Historical population
Year	Pop.	±%
1999	3,206	—
2000	3,147	−1.8%
2001	3,147	+0.0%
2002	3,223	+2.4%
2003	3,230	+0.2%
2004	3,382	+4.7%
2005	3,565	+5.4%
2017	3,251	−8.8%
Source: INE (Spain)

== See also ==
- List of municipalities in Almería
