= Bayarque =

- Municipality
- Flag Seal

- Location within Spain Location within Andalusia Location within Province of Almería
- Coordinates: 37°19′48.1″N 2°26′19.1″W
- Country: Spain
- A. community: Andalucía
- Province: Almería

Government
  - Mayor: Antonio Pordoy

Area
  - Total: 26.70 km^{2} (10.31 sq mi)

Population (January 1, 2021)
  - Total: 218
  - Density: 8.165/km^{2} (21.15/sq mi)
- Time zone: UTC+01:00
- Postal code: 04888
- MCN: 04021
- Website: Official website

Bayarque is a municipality of Almería province, in the autonomous community of Andalusia, Spain.

== Demographics ==
Historical population

Year	Pop.	±%
1999	234	—
2000	238	+1.7%
2001	241	+1.3%
2002	235	−2.5%
2003	233	−0.9%
2004	246	+5.6%
2005	250	+1.6%
2006	237	−5.2%
2007	244	+3.0%

Year	Pop.	±%
2008	244	+0.0%
2009	230	−5.7%
2010	233	+1.3%
2011	229	−1.7%
2012	224	−2.2%
2013	216	−3.6%
2014	216	+0.0%
2015	216	+0.0%
2016	220	+1.9%

Year	Pop.	±%
2017	215	−2.3%
2018	206	−4.2%
2019	215	+4.4%
2020	216	+0.5%
2021	219	+1.4%
2022	226	+3.2%
2023	221	−2.2%
2024	224	+1.4%

Source: Instituto Nacional de Estadística

== See also ==
- List of municipalities in Almería
