= Sierra de Los Filabres =

Mountain range in Almería Province, Andalusia, Spain

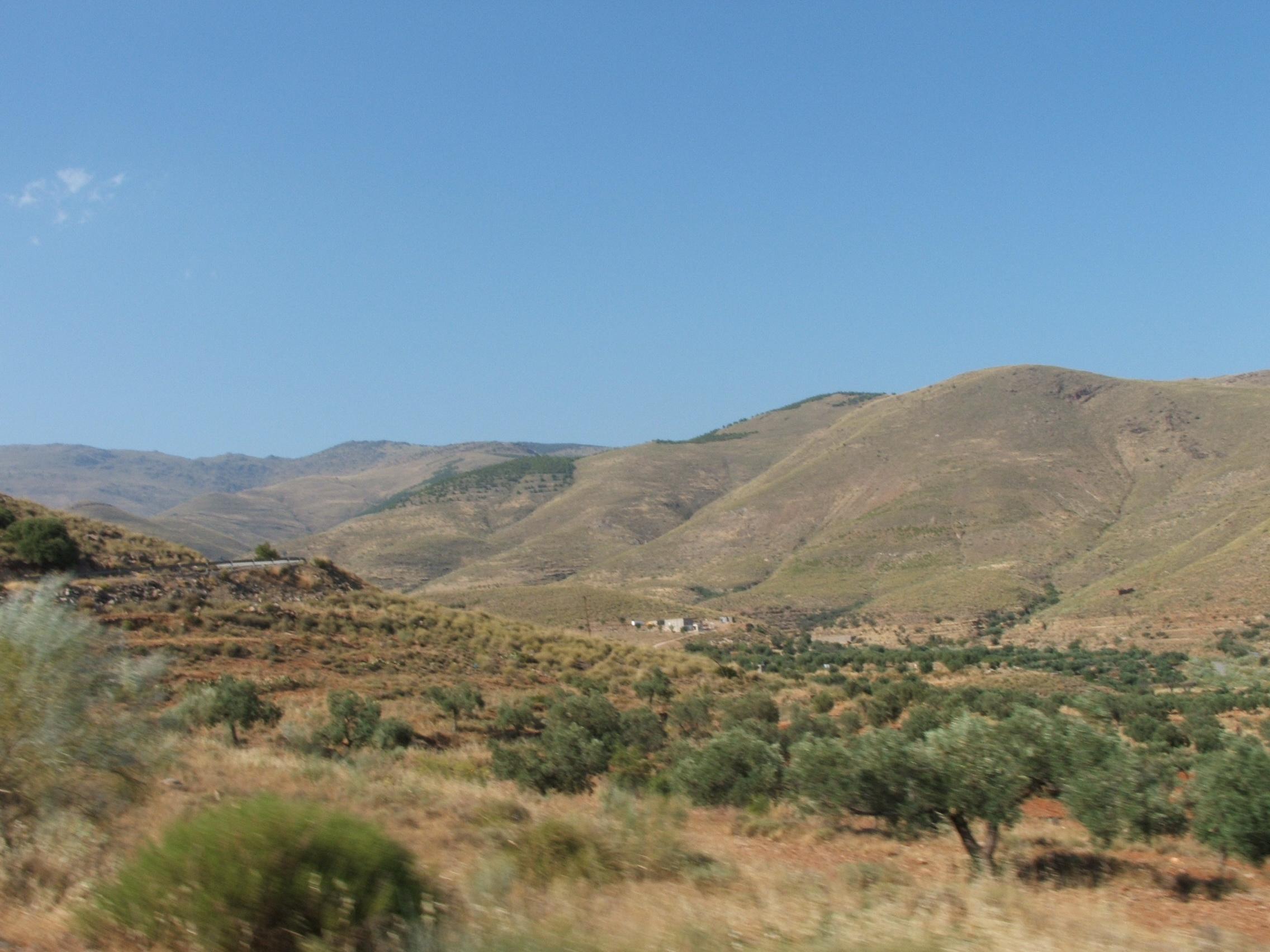
- View of Sierra de Los Filabres

Highest point
- Peak: Calar Alto
- Elevation: 2,168 m (7,113 ft)
- Coordinates: 37°13′25″N 02°32′46″W

Geography
- Location within Spain
- Location: Almería Province, Andalusia
- Country: Spain
- Parent range: Penibaetic System

Geology
- Mountain type(s): Schist and Quartzite

Sierra de Los Filabres is the largest mountain range in Almería Province, Andalusia, Spain, measuring 50 km (31 mi) in length.

Its highest point, Calar Alto, also hosts an important astronomical observatory.

== Geography ==
The Sierra de Los Filabres belongs to the Penibaetic System and forms the southern limit of the Almanzora Valley. Besides its highest point, the 2,168 m high Calar Alto, other important peaks are the Tetica de Bacares or "La Tetica" (2,086 m), a breast-shaped hill, and the Calar Gallinero (2,049 m).

The Sierra de Los Filabres is an eastern prolongation of the Sierra de Baza mountain range in the same system. There are picturesque towns in this range, like Olula de Castro, Chercos Viejo and Sierro, to name but a few. The easiest route to reach the range starts from Gérgal.

== See also ==
- Baetic System
- Calar Alto Observatory
- Sierras de las Estancias y los Filabres DO
