= Lúcar =

Lúcar, Spain
- Flag Seal
- Interactive map of Lúcar, Spain
- Coordinates: 37°24′N 2°25′W
- Country: Spain
- Community: Andalusia
- Municipality: Almería

Government
  - Mayor: José Antonio González Sáez (PSOE)

Area
  - Total: 95 km^{2} (37 sq mi)
- Elevation: 895 m (2,936 ft)

Population (2025-01-01)
  - Total: 829
  - Density: 8.7/km^{2} (23/sq mi)
- Time zone: UTC+1 (CET)
  - Summer (DST): UTC+2 (CEST)

Lúcar is a municipality of Almería province, in the autonomous community of Andalusia, Spain.

== Demographics ==
Historical population
Year	Pop.	±%
1999	792	—
2000	767	−3.2%
2001	787	+2.6%
2002	786	−0.1%
2003	791	+0.6%
2004	798	+0.9%
2005	822	+3.0%
Source: INE (Spain)

== See also ==
- List of municipalities in Almería
