= Partaloa =

Partaloa, Spain
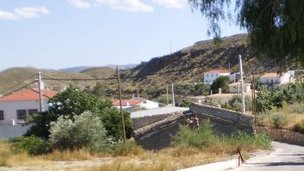

- Flag Coat of arms
- Interactive map of Partaloa, Spain
- Coordinates: 37°24′N 2°13′W
- Country: Spain
- Community: Andalusia
- Municipality: Almería

Government
  - Mayor: Federico Molina Mora (PSOE)

Area
  - Total: 53 km^{2} (20 sq mi)
- Elevation: 544 m (1,785 ft)

Population (2025-01-01)
  - Total: 836
  - Density: 16/km^{2} (41/sq mi)
- Time zone: UTC+1 (CET)
  - Summer (DST): UTC+2 (CEST)

Partaloa is a municipality of Almería province, in the autonomous community of Andalusia, Spain.

== Demographics ==
Historical population
Year	Pop.	±%
1999	377	—
2000	384	+1.9%
2001	377	−1.8%
2002	391	+3.7%
2003	469	+19.9%
2004	529	+12.8%
2005	611	+15.5%
Source: INE (Spain)

== See also ==
- List of municipalities in Almería
