= Seron (surname) =

Seron is a surname. Notable people with the surname include:

- Carroll Seron, American sociologist
- Devon Seron (born 1993), Filipina actress and television personality
- Guillaume Séron, Belgian water polo player
- Pierre Seron (1942–2017), Belgian comic book artist
