= Serón =

- Municipality
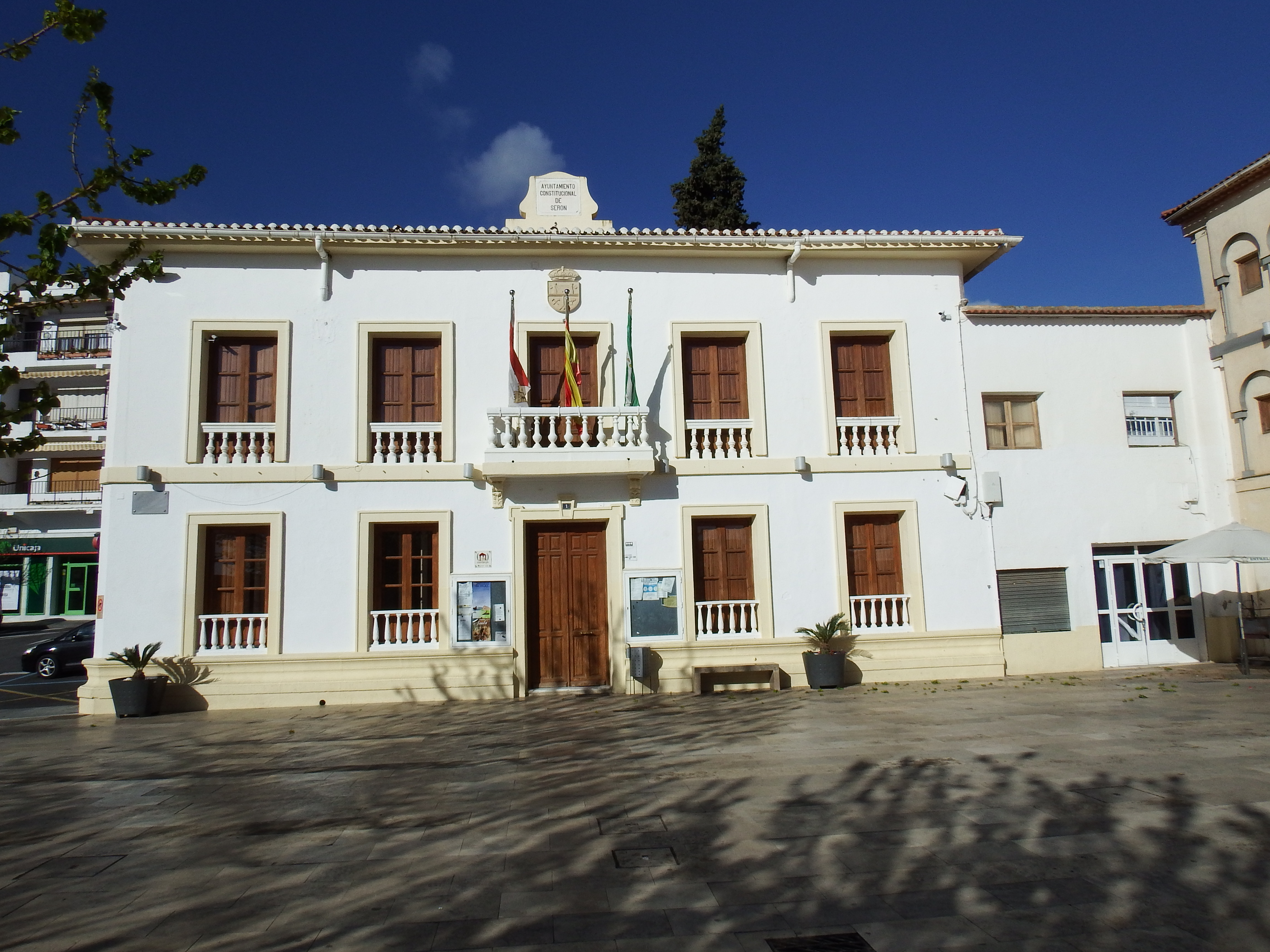
- Town hall

- Flag Coat of arms
- Interactive map of Serón
- Coordinates: 37°20′N 2°30′W
- Country: Spain
- Autonomous Community: Andalusia
- Municipality: Almería
- Comarca: Almanzora

Government
  - Mayor: Juan Antonio Lorenzo Cazorla (PSOE)

Area
  - Total: 167 km^{2} (64 sq mi)
- Elevation: 822 m (2,697 ft)

Population (2025-01-01)
  - Total: 2,151
  - Density: 12.9/km^{2} (33.4/sq mi)
- Time zone: UTC+1 (CET)
  - Summer (DST): UTC+2 (CEST)

Serón is a municipality of Almería province, in the autonomous community of Andalusia, Spain.

== Demographics ==
Historical population
| Year | Pop. | ±% |
|---|---|---|
| 1999 | 2,673 | — |
| 2000 | 2,555 | −4.4% |
| 2001 | 2,495 | −2.3% |
| 2002 | 2,488 | −0.3% |
| 2003 | 2,414 | −3.0% |
| 2004 | 2,427 | +0.5% |
| 2005 | 2,429 | +0.1% |
Source: INE (Spain)

== See also ==
- List of municipalities in Almería
