= Seron =

According to Moses Chorenensis, Seron was a town related by tradition to have been "The Place of Dispersion," on account of the dispersion of Noah's sons after the Flood. The name occurs in a footnote appended to The Complete Works of Josephus, translated by William Whiston. The town is named alongside a reference to another place in Armenia called The Place of Descent, thought by the natives of the country to be the place where the ark of Noah alighted.
