= Macael =

Macael, Spain
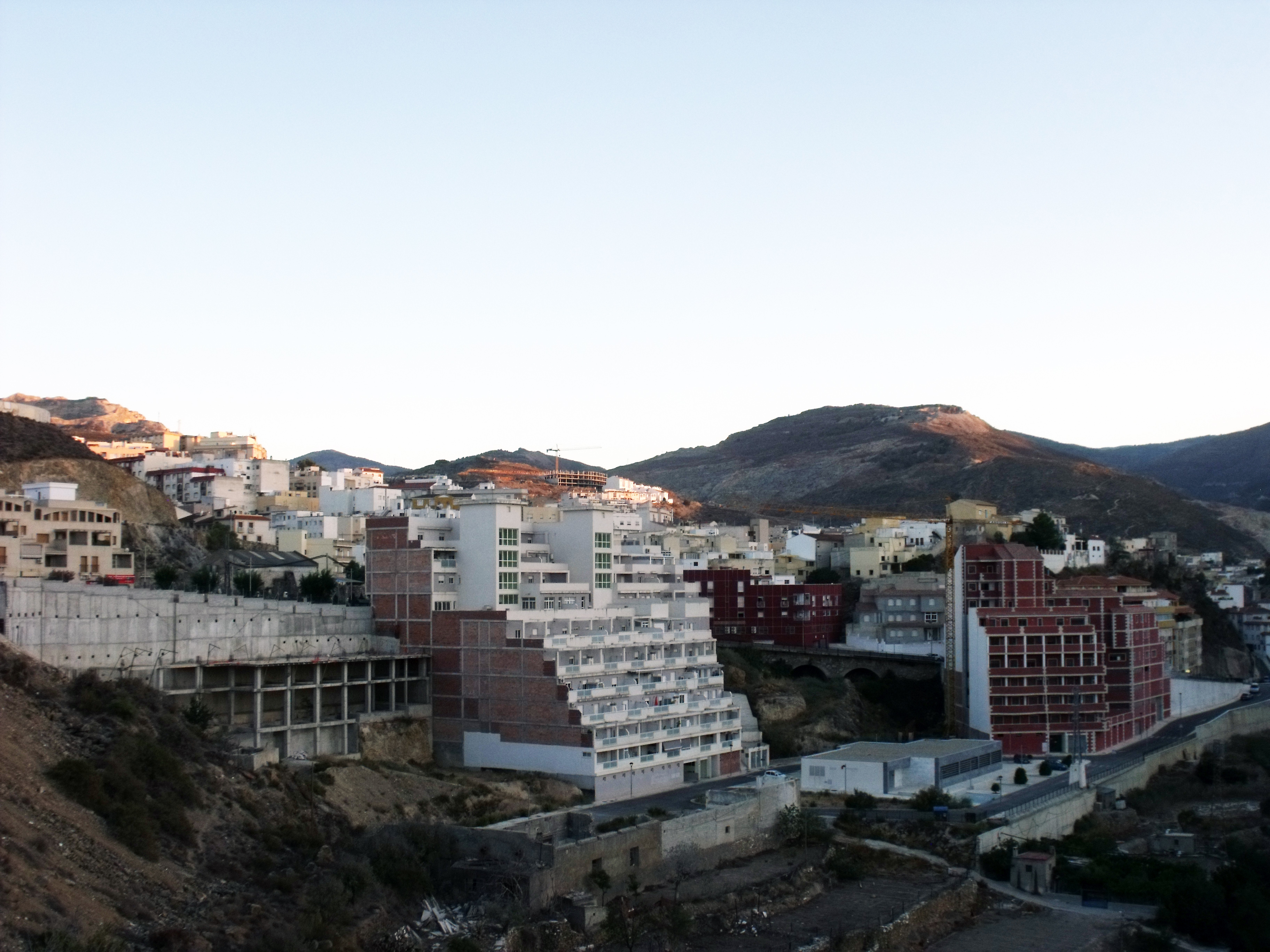
- View of Macael

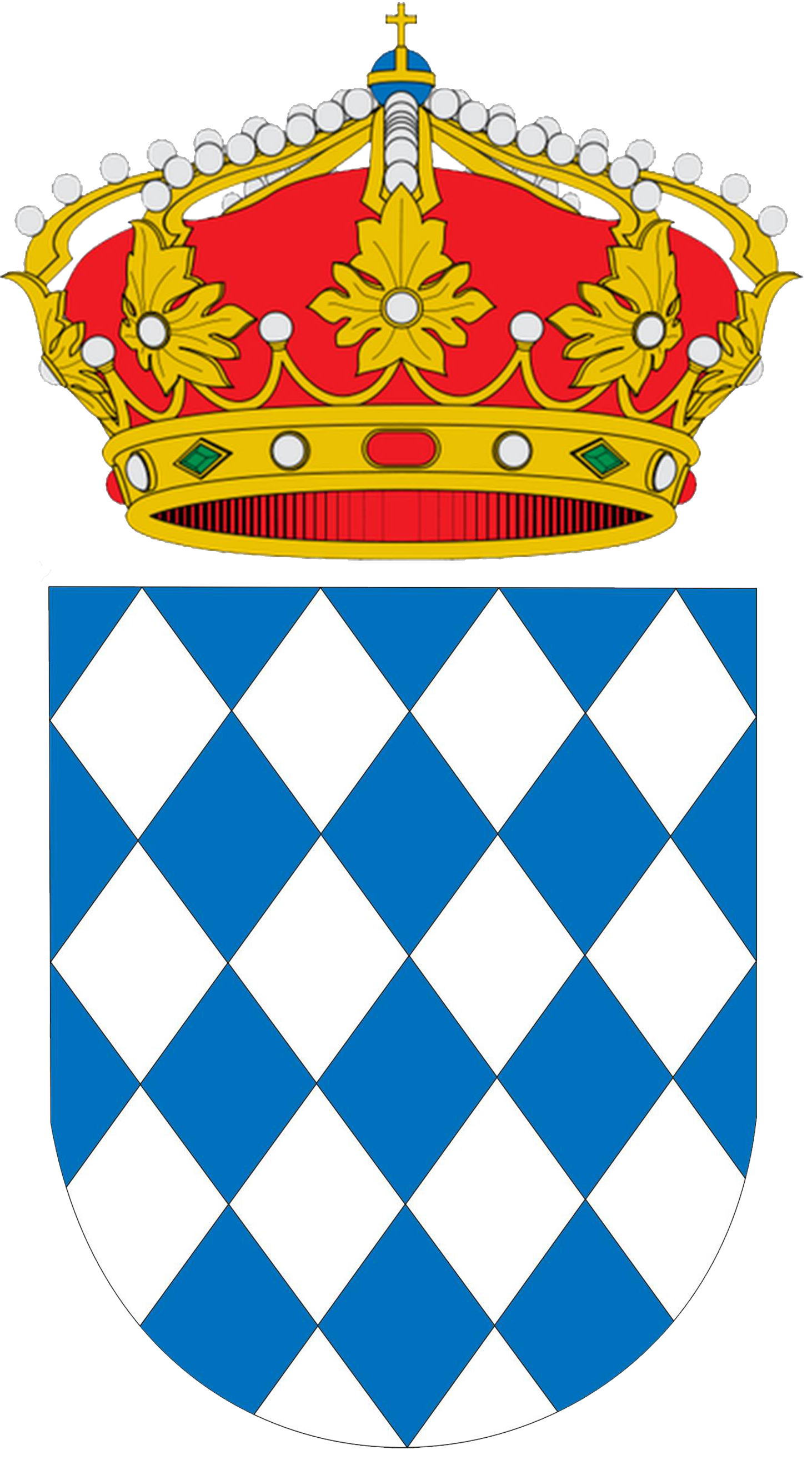
- Flag Seal

- Location within Province of Almería Location within Andalusia Location within Spain
- Coordinates: 37°20′N 2°18′W
- Country: Spain
- Community: Andalusia
- Municipality: Almería

Government
  - Mayor: Juan Pastor Molina (PSOE)

Area
  - Total: 44 km^{2} (17 sq mi)
- Elevation: 554 m (1,818 ft)

Population (2025-01-01)
  - Total: 5,436
  - Density: 120/km^{2} (320/sq mi)
- Time zone: UTC+1 (CET)
  - Summer (DST): UTC+2 (CEST)

Macael is a municipality of Almería province, in the autonomous community of Andalusia, Spain. Macael is famous for the production of marble.

== Demographics ==
Historical population
Year	Pop.	±%
1999	5,861	—
2000	5,767	−1.6%
2001	5,786	+0.3%
2002	5,857	+1.2%
2003	5,893	+0.6%
2004	6,002	+1.8%
2005	6,091	+1.5%
Source: INE (Spain)

== Twin towns ==
Macael is twinned with:

- Esplugues de Llobregat, Spain
- Jarrie, France

== See also ==
- List of municipalities in Almería
