= Province of Almería =

Province of Spain

Province of Almería Provincia de Almería
- Province
- Flag Coat of arms

- Location of the Province of Almería in Spain
- Coordinates: 37°01′07″N 2°26′41″W
- Country: Spain
- Autonomous community: Andalusia
- Capital: Almería
- Municipalities: 103 (list)

Government
  - Type: Diputación
  - Body: Provincial Deputation of Almería
  - President: José Antonio García Alcaina (PP)

Area
  - Total: 8,773.06 km^{2} (3,387.30 sq mi)
  - Rank: 27th in Spain

Population (2025)
  - Total: 770,554
  - Rank: 21st in Spain
  - Density: 87.8318/km^{2} (227.483/sq mi)
- Demonyms: Almeriense, urcitano
- ISO 3166 code: ES-AL
- Website: dipalme.org

The Province of Almería (/ˌælməˈriːə/, also US: /ˌɑːl-/; Spanish: [almeˈɾi.a]) is a province of the autonomous community of Andalusia in Spain. It is bordered by the province of Granada, the region of Murcia, and the Mediterranean Sea. Its capital is the homonymous city of Almería.

The province has a population of 770,554 and an area of 8,773.06 km^{2} (3,387.30 sq mi) across its 103 municipalities.

== History ==
=== Prehistoric ===
The Paleolithic Age of Almería was characterized by small nomadic and hunter-gatherer groups. The oldest Paleolithic site is Zájara Cave I (Cueva de Zájara I) in the Caves of the Almanzora (Cuevas del Almanzora).

The first villages and spaces dedicated exclusively to burials appear by the Neolithic Age, and even before the Upper Paleolithic Age. The cave paintings of the Cave of the Signs (Cueva de los Letreros) and twenty other caves and shelters of Los Vélez are dated to this era, and were designated a World Heritage site by Unesco in 1989.

In one of the shelters of the first settlers of the peninsula, the Coat of the Beehives (Abrigo de las Colmenas), there remains a human figure with arms outstretched holding an arc above its head. According to legend, this picture represents a covenant made by prehistoric man with the gods to prevent future floods. It is the earliest depiction of the Almerían Indalo, which was named in memory of Saint Indaletius, and means Indal Eccius ("messenger of the gods") in the Iberian language.

Over the years, the Indalo has become the best known symbol of Almería. Some see this figure as a man holding a rainbow, but it might also be an archer pointing a bow towards the sky. The Indalo lent its name to the artistic and intellectual movement of the Indalianos led by Jesús de Perceval and Eugenio d'Ors which was a movement of nostalgic attraction by the people of Mojácar. The people of Mojácar painted Indalos with chalk on the walls of their houses to guard against storms and the Evil Eye.

It was Luis Siret y Cels, an eminent Belgian archaeologist, who described the rich prehistoric wealth of Almería, particularly that of the Metal Age. Siret said that Almería was like "an open-air museum". Indeed, Almería is home to two of the most important cultures of the Metal Age in the peninsula: Los Millares and El Argar.

The earliest known city, Los Millares, dates to the Copper Age and is strategically located on a spur of rock between the Andarax River and the Huéchar Ravine (rambla de Huéchar), in the southern part of the province. It was a town of more than a thousand inhabitants, protected by three lines of walls and towers, and had an economy based on copper metallurgy, agriculture, animal husbandry, and hunting on a moderate scale. Furthermore, they constructed a large necropolis and exported metal figures and pottery to a large part of the peninsula.

The equally influential culture of El Argar appeared later, during the Bronze Age. They developed a characteristic form of pottery, the vaso campaniforme ("beaker") that spread throughout all of Northern Spain. Their cemeteries were more advanced with respect to the culture of Los Millares and they had diverse agricultural production and animal husbandry.

=== Ancient ===
The rich local customs and fiestas retain links deep into the past, back to the eras of the Umayyads, Romans, Greeks, and Phoenicians.

=== Middle Ages ===
It became part of the Umayyad Caliphate in 711. During the taifa era, it was ruled by the Arab Muslim Banu al-Amiri tribe from 1012 to 1038, briefly annexed by Valencia (1038–1041), then given by Zaragoza to the Banu Sumadih dynasty until its conquest by the Almoravids in 1091. Some centuries later, it became part of the kingdom of Granada.

== Geography ==
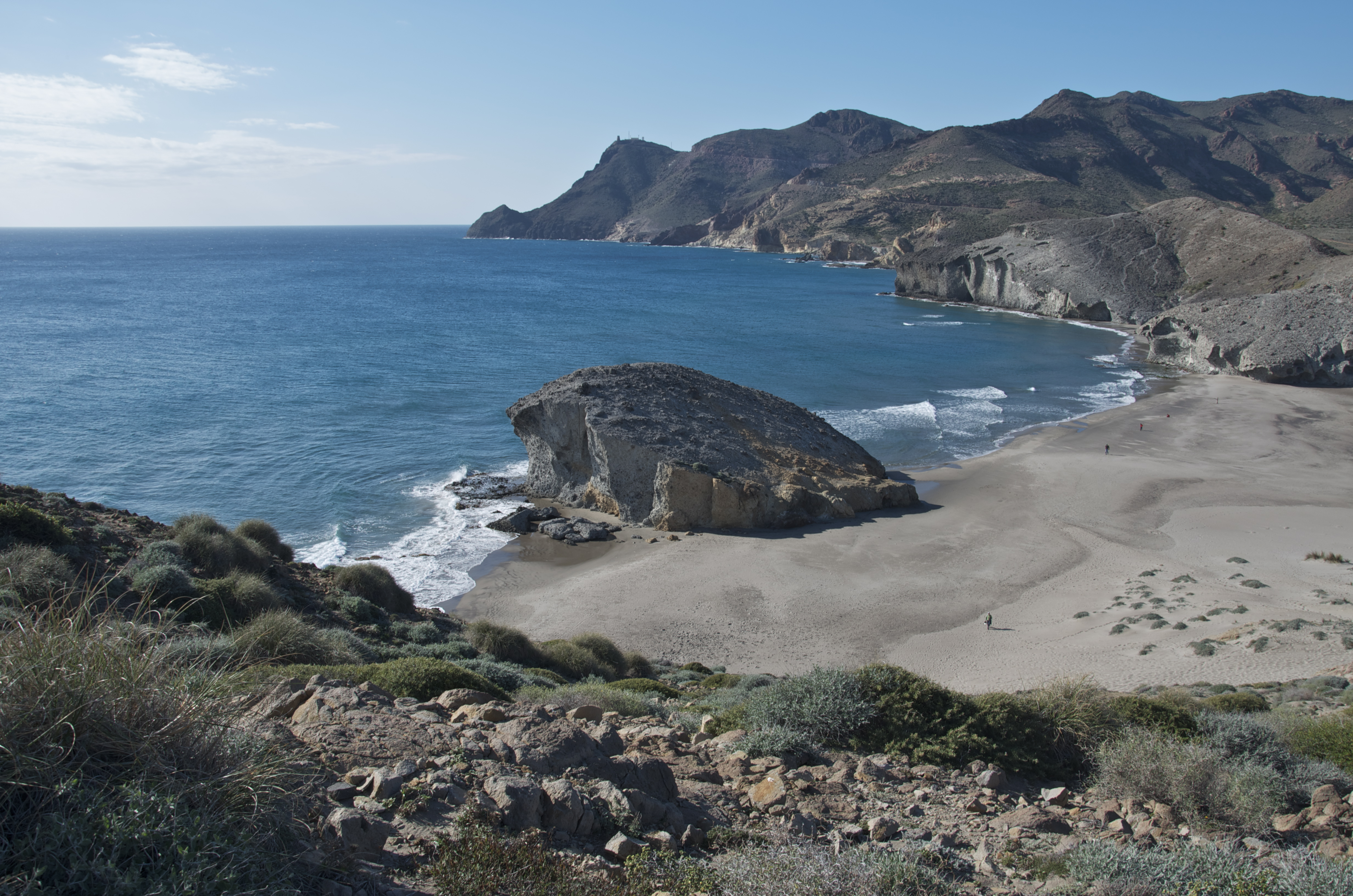
Cabo de Gata-Níjar Natural Park

The highest mountain range in the Province of Almería is the 50 km (31 mi) long Sierra de Los Filabres, a subrange of the Sierra Nevada.

Europe's driest area is found in Almería and is part of the Cabo de Gata-Níjar Natural Park. The arid landscape and climate of the province have made it an ideal setting for Western films, especially during the 1960s. Because of the demand for these locations, quite a number of Western towns were built near the Tabernas Desert. Films such as A Fistful of Dollars, For a Few Dollars More, and The Good, the Bad and the Ugly were shot here. Years later, the film of 800 Bullets was filmed in the same place. Large sections of Conan the Barbarian (1982), Indiana Jones and the Last Crusade, Lawrence of Arabia and Patton were shot there as well.

The main rivers are the Andarax River and Almanzora River, which are located near Granada in the Alpujarras. The Benínar Reservoir, located near Darrical, provides part of the water needed in the production in greenhouses.

=== Fauna ===
Almería has very diverse and rich fauna. Animals found in Cabo de Gata and Níjar include the red fox, the Algerian hedgehog and reptiles such as the ocellated lizard, Timon nevadensis, and the ladder snake. Birds characteristic of the Sierra de María-los Vélez include the crested lark, the calandria, and the common pipit, as well as birds of prey like Bonelli's eagle. Snakes and butterflies are common. The Parnassius butterfly stands out due to its endemic status. In the Sierra Nevada and the Sierra de los Filabres there are also many birds of prey and protected mammals such as the mountain goat, the European wildcat and the wild boar.

== Demographics ==
Historical population
Year	Pop.	±%
1842	252,952	—
1857	315,664	+24.8%
1877	358,205	+13.5%
1887	345,929	−3.4%
1900	366,170	+5.9%
1910	398,221	+8.8%
1920	383,692	−3.6%
1930	360,180	−6.1%
1940	373,702	+3.8%
1950	361,769	−3.2%
1960	369,447	+2.1%
1970	377,639	+2.2%
1981	410,831	+8.8%
1991	455,496	+10.9%
2001	536,731	+17.8%
2011	688,736	+28.3%
2021	730,430	+6.1%
Source: INE

As of 2025, the population is 770,554, of which 51.0% are male, and 49.0% are female. Minors make up 19.2% of the population, and seniors make up 16.3%.

=== Immigration ===
As of 2025, immigrants make up 25.2% of the population. The 5 largest foreign countries of birth are Morocco, Romania, the United Kingdom, Colombia, and Senegal.

== Economy ==
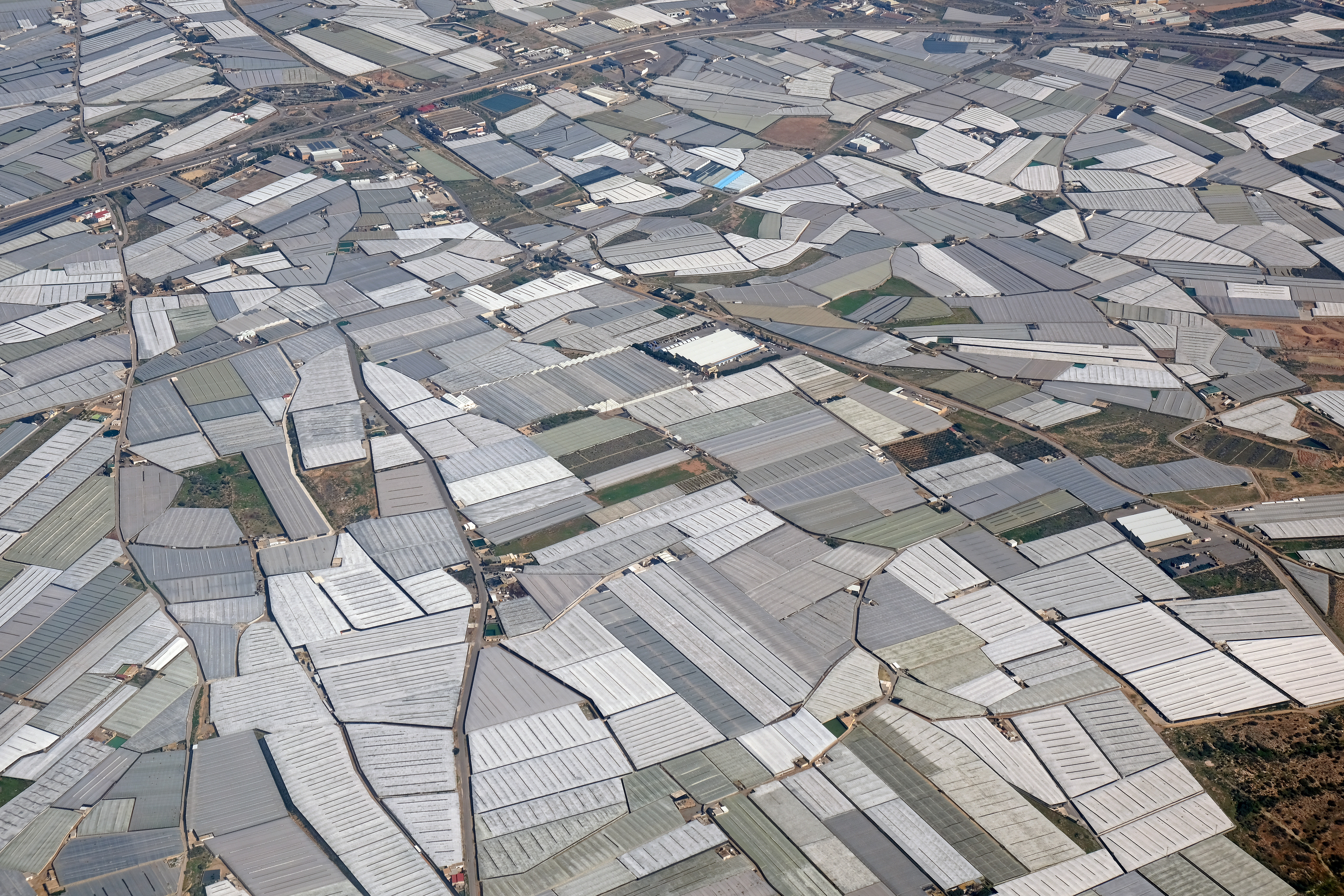
Greenhouses near El Ejido

Historically, Almería was an important exporter of minerals (especially iron, lead, and fine marble) and grapes. The most important economic activity is now greenhouse farming. Millions of tons of vegetables are exported to other European countries and other parts of the world each year.

Tourism is also a key sector of the economy, due to the sunny weather and attractive areas such as Roquetas de Mar, Aguadulce, El Ejido, Mojacar, Vera or Cabo de Gata.

=== Industry ===
The principal industrial activity is in the Macael (Comarca del Marmol) canteras marble quarrying area in the Sierra de los Filabres region from Macael Viejo to Chercos, Lijar and Cobdar which produce in excess of 1.3 million tons. The Cantoria, Fines, Olula del Rio and Purchena area of the Alto Almanzora valley is fast becoming the regional megalopolis through high imports and exports and employment in local, national and international marble processing. Tourism and construction along the Spanish coast have driven sustained demand and contributed to significant modernisation in the province. Small pueblos of agriculturalists have given rise to computerised machining factories.

=== Transport ===
Air travel for the province is served by Almería Airport which is the fourth largest airport in the Andalusia region. The airport provides air services to other parts of Spain and other European destinations.

=== Research facilities ===
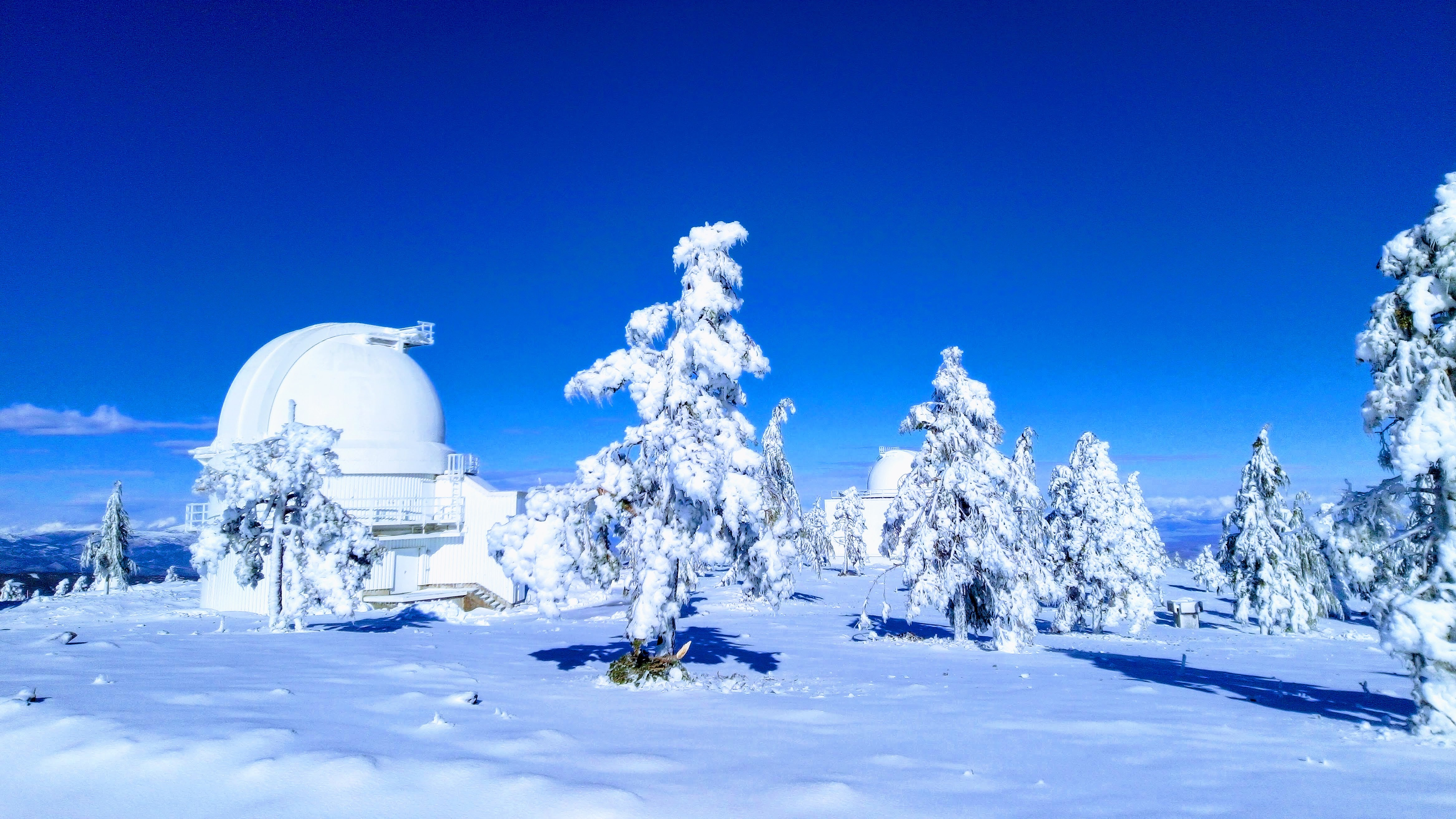
Calar Alto Observatory

The German-Spanish Calar Alto Observatory is one of the most important observatories in Spain.

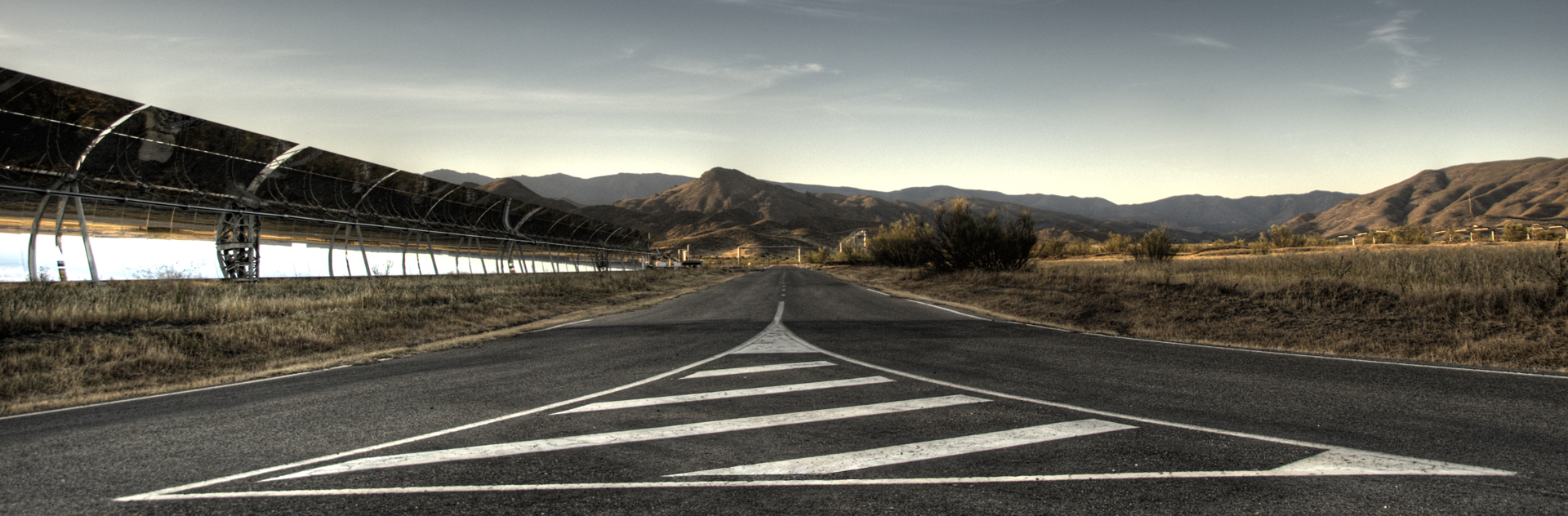
Plataforma Solar de Almería

In Tabernas there is a solar energy research centre, the Plataforma Solar de Almería (PSA).

France's Michelin operates an industrial research centre in Cabo de Gata.

=== Issues ===
An estimated 7,000-10,000 immigrant fruit pickers live in toxic conditions in shanty towns next to fruit farms in the region, and are exploited by employers who pay them less than minimum wage and offer no PPE as mandated by law.

== See also ==
- 1966 Palomares accident
