= Levante Almeriense =

- Comarca
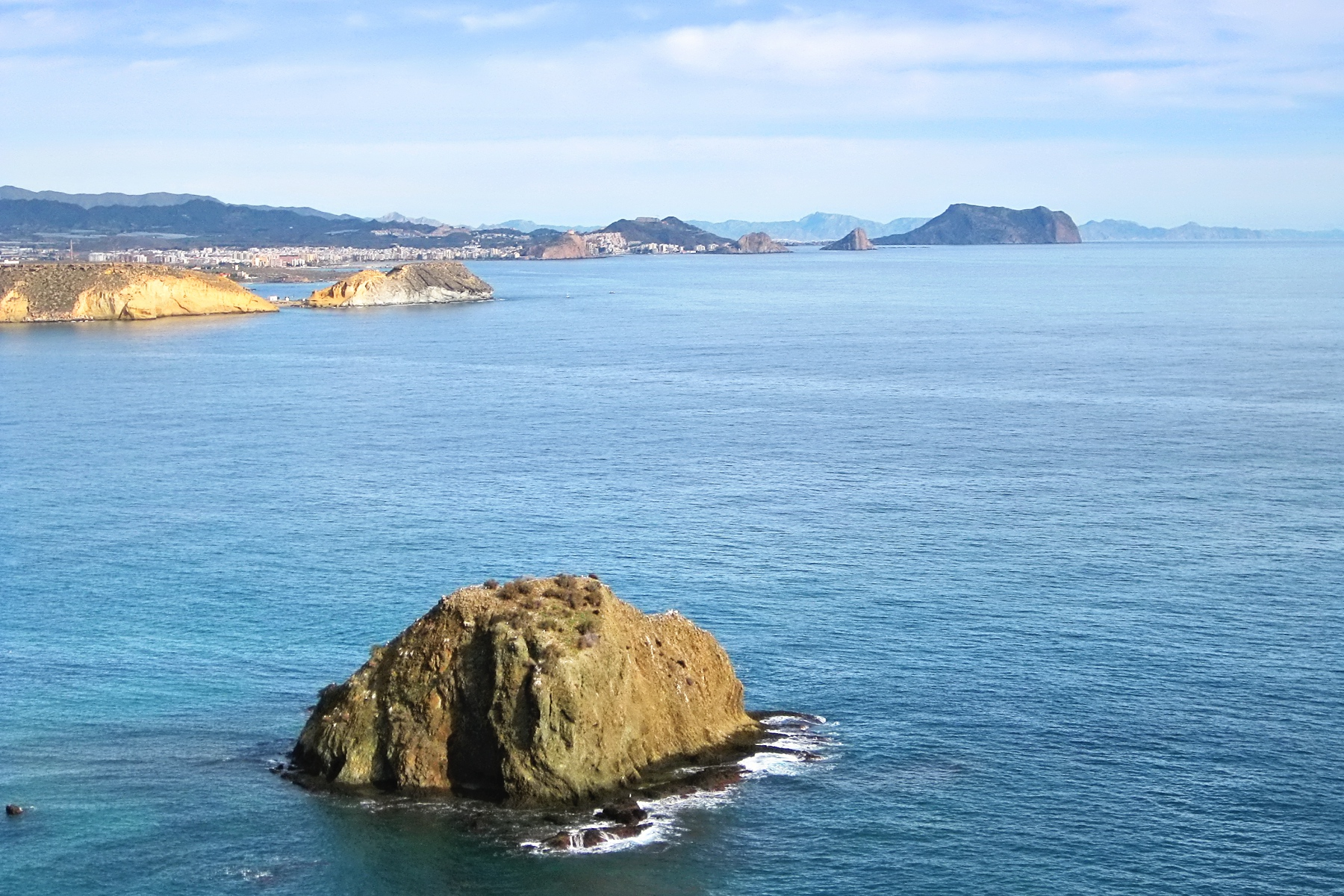
- Terreros and Negra islands, in Pulpí

- Location of Levante Almeriense in Andalusia, Spain

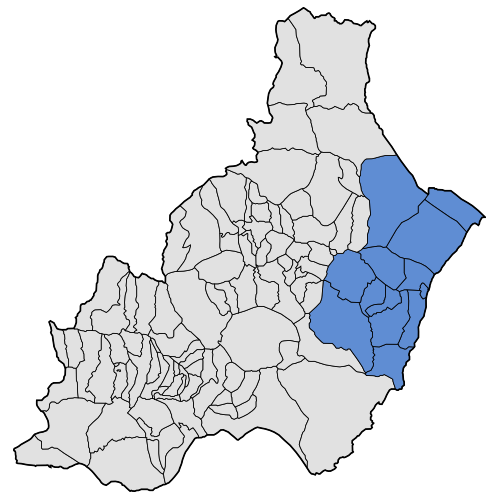
- Location of Levante Almeriense in the province of Almería
- Country: Spain
- Autonomous community: Andalusia
- Province: Almería

Area
  - Total: 1,585.35 km^{2} (612.11 sq mi)

Population (2024) (Note: Census at 1 January 2024: National Statistics Institute (Spain))
  - Total: 109,469
  - Density: 69.0504/km^{2} (178.840/sq mi)

Levante Almeriense is one of the seven comarcas in the province of Almeria, Andalusia, Spain. This comarca was established in 2003 by the Government of Andalusia. It is located in the oriental side and it was occupied since the Bronze Age, with several archeological sites like El Argar, marqués de los Vélez castle, karst en yesos de Sorbas, etc.

The economy grew since the last quarter of the 20th century, thanks to agriculture and transport. Other prominent economic activities are the cement factory and (growing) rural tourism.

== Municipalities ==
The Levante Almeriense comarca has thirteen municipalities:

Arms	Municipality	Area (km^{2})	Population (2024) (Note: Census at 1 January 2024: National Statistics Institute (Spain))	Density (/km^{2})
	Antas	99.01	3,450	34.84
	Bédar	46.69	976	20.90
	Carboneras	95.46	8,441	88.42
	Cuevas del Almanzora	263.93	15,246	57.77
	Los Gallardos	34.91	3,071	87.97
	Garrucha	7.68	10,603	1,380.60
	Huércal-Overa	318.22	20,609	64.76
	Lubrín	138.13	1,428	10.34
	Mojácar	71.54	7,517	105.07
	Pulpí	94.55	11,906	125.92
	Sorbas	249.16	2,525	10.13
	Turre	107.96	4,209	38.99
	Vera	58.11	19,488	335.36
	Total	1,585.35	109,469	69.05
