= Méndez de Sotomayor =

Spanish noble house

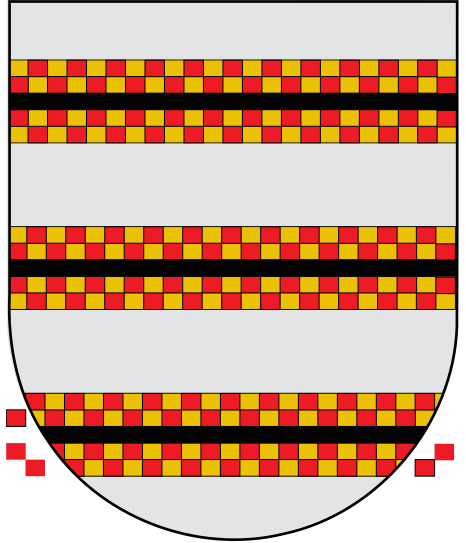
Coat of Arms of the House of Méndez de Sotomayor.

The House of Méndez de Sotomayor is a branch of the House of Sotomayor that rose to prominence during King Ferdinand III of Castile's reign and went on to found the Señorio del Castillo de Carpio. The house was known for its service to both the Kingdom of Castile and the Kingdom of Spain.

== History ==
The House of Méndez de Sotomayor was the branch of the House of Sotomayor or Soutomaior that held title over the Señorio del Castillo de Carpio and the later Marquesado. The family was originally landed with title over Soutomaior, Province of Pontevedra, Galicia. Indeed, this original branch of the family would reach levels of significant prominence in the early 18th century with the creation of the Ducado de Sotomayor under Fernando Yáñez de Sotomayor Lima y Brito in 1703. The Méndez de Sotomayor branch of the family made it into the service of the Kingdom of Castile and participated in the Reconquista campaigns in Cordoba.

The house was founded by Don Men Paez Sorred, a Ricohombre of Alfonso VII of Castile.

By the mid 13th century, Ferdinand III of Castile was involved in a series of Reconquista campaigns against the Caliphate of Córdoba and other minor Christian and Moorish territories in the area around El Carpio, Andalucía, Province of Córdoba as a part of his campaign for Alcocer (Al-Qusayr). After victory in this campaign in 1240, Ferdinand III divvied the land up between the Castilian crown and the nobles who took part in the campaign as Señorios and other titles tied to the Castilian crown. Heavily involved in the fighting, the House of Sotomayor was awarded much of the land principally in the area around El Carpio. By 1325, the Sotomayor lands, passed down by various family members, were collected and amassed by Garcí Méndez II de Sotomayor who was responsible for the founding of the Señorio del Castillo de Carpio. The foundation of the Señorio is generally placed at 1325, the year that the tower at El Carpio was completed. The tower and its surrounding fortifications would serve as the center of administration for the Señorio and the Marquesado of Carpio until the title became associated with the Dukes of Alba.

Eventually, parts of this branch of the House of Sotomayor would merge through marriage with the House of Haro and the titles over El Carpio would be elevated in 1559 to a Marquesado with Grandesa de España under Diego López de Haro y Sotomayor.

== Head of House ==
Head of House	Period	Title
--
?		
Don Men Paez Sorred	?–?	Ricohombre of King Alfonso VII of Castile
Pedro Méndez I de Sotomayor	?–1096	Bishop of Orense
Garci Méndez I de Sotomayor	?–?	
Alfonso García de Sotomayor	?–?	
Garci Méndez II de Sotomayor	?–?	I Señor del Castillo de Carpio
Garci Méndez III de Sotomayor	?-?	II Señor del Castillo de Carpio
Gomez Garcia de Sotomayor	?–?	III Señor del Castillo de Carpio
Garci Méndez IV de Sotomayor	?-?	IV Señor del Castillo de Carpio
Don Luis Méndez I de Sotomayor	?–?	V Señor del Castillo de Carpio
Garci Méndez V de Sotomayor	?–?	VI Señor del Castillo de Carpio
Luis Méndez II de Sotomayor	?–?	VII Señor del Castillo de Carpio
Beatriz Méndez de Sotomayor	?–1559	VIII Señora del Castillo de Carpio
Diego Lopez de Haro y Sotomayor	1559-1582	IX or X Señor del Castillo de Carpio and I Marques del Carpio

== See also ==
- Señorio del Castillo de Carpio
- Marquesado del Carpio
- House of Haro
