= 2026 Almería wildfire =

Wildfire in Spain

- Part of the 2026 wildfire season (2026 Spain wildfires)
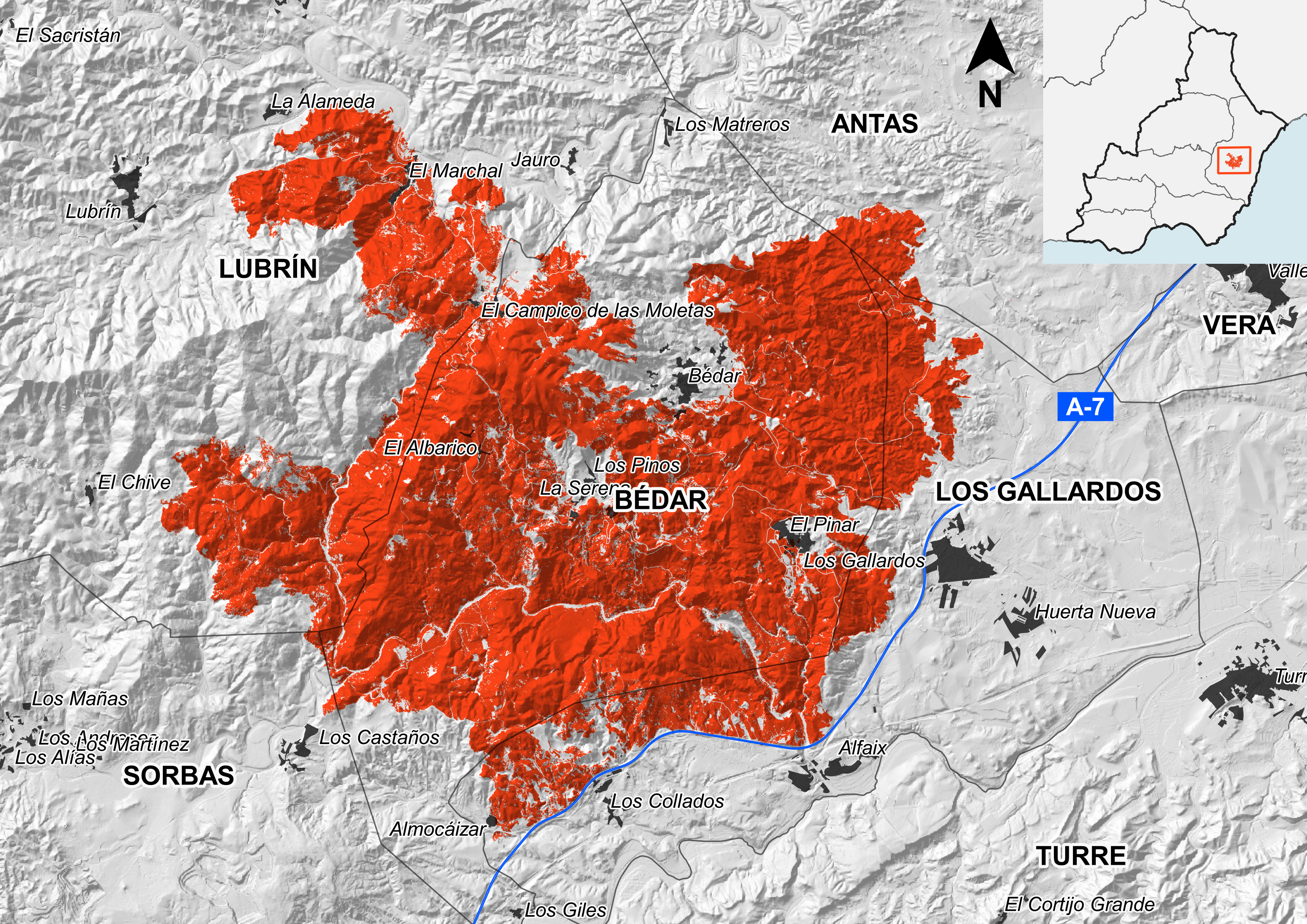
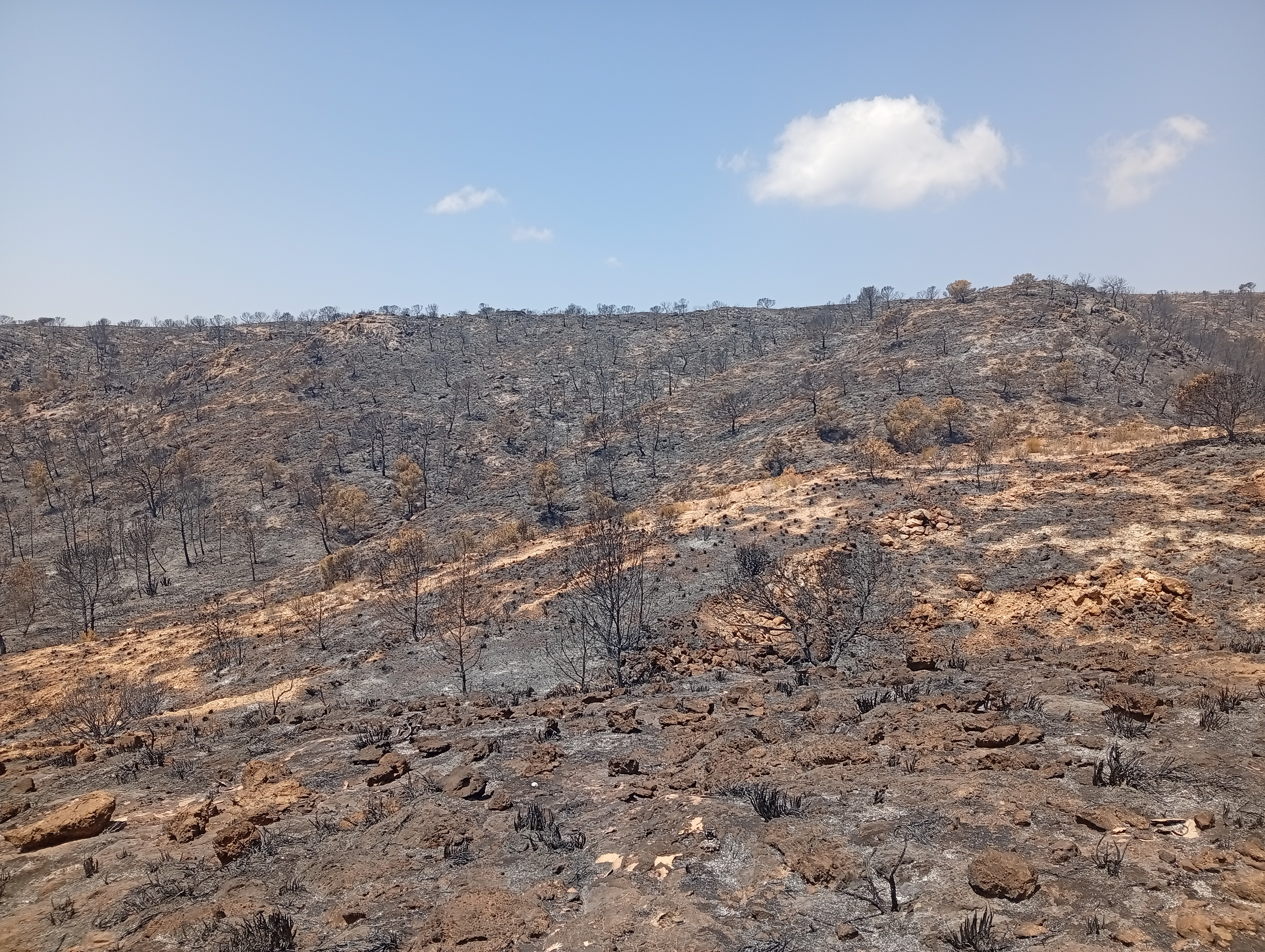
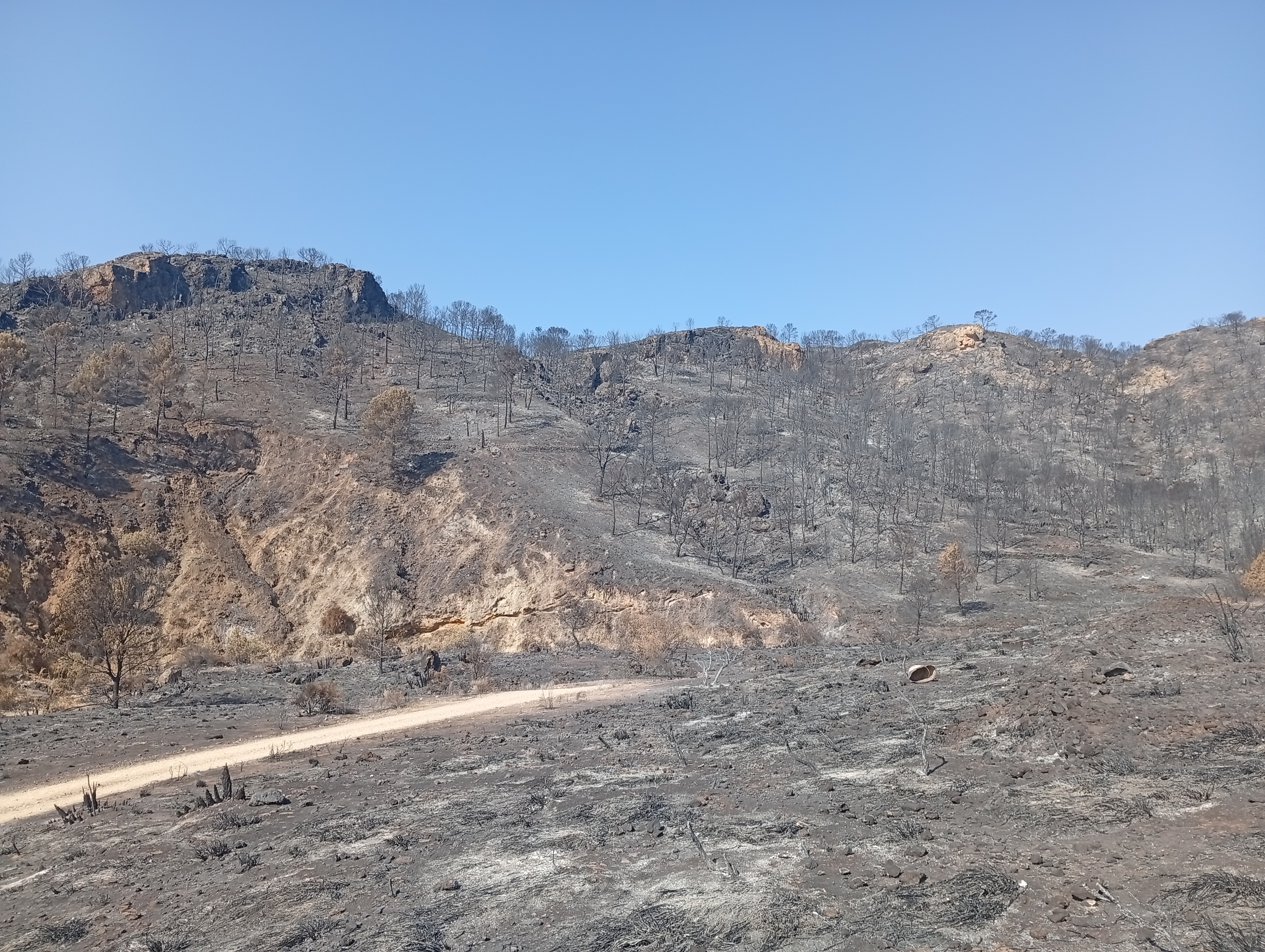
- Top: Extent over the area's topography based on estimates from the Copernicus Emergency Management System using satellite imagery (July 12, 2026). Bottom: Aftermath of the fire in the town of Bédar
- Date: 9 July 2026 – 14 July 2026
- Location: Los Gallardos, Almería Province, Andalusia, Spain
- Coordinates: 37°08′09″N 2°00′42″W

Statistics
- Status: Extinguished
- Burned area: 7,000 ha (17,000 acres)

Impacts
- Deaths: 14
- Injuries: 17
- Missing people: 10
- Evacuated: 1,600+
- Structures destroyed: Multiple

Ignition
- Cause: Under investigation

On 9 July 2026, a deadly wildfire broke out near Los Gallardos, Almería Province, Andalusia, Spain, burning dry esparto grass, pastures, and low scrub. It has destroyed numerous vehicles and homes, resulting in 16 deaths, at least 17 injuries, 10 people missing and the evacuation of more than 1,600 residents. The wildfire is the deadliest in Andalusian history and the third deadliest in Spanish history.

The fire occurred amidst deadly heatwaves circulating through Europe that contributed to its severity. It has affected the towns of Los Gallardos, Bédar, Antas and Lubrín in Almería. The country recorded 1,028 heat-related fatalities in 2026.

== Fire ==
=== 9 July ===
Although authorities have not confirmed the cause, witnesses reported that a downed power line sparked a problem that quickly spread to a nearby wooded area. Electricity provider Endesa denied the claims, saying that power line was inactive and did not belong to them. Authorities dispatched 150 firefighters, 124 vehicles, 12 fire engines, two water tankers, 30 aircraft, fire suppression technicians, and medical units. Strong winds and extreme heat fueled the wildfire, causing it to spread rapidly and hampering suppression efforts.

=== 10 July ===
In the early hours of the morning, authorities confirmed the discovery of 12 dead and several injured, and reported that 23 people remained missing. At 5:30 a.m., the Military Emergencies Unit (UME) joined the firefighting operation with 220 personnel from the Second Emergency Intervention Battalion (BIEM II), who carried out tasks such as sealing the perimeter, extinguishing the fire, digging trenches and operating heavy machinery. INFOCA Plan personnel carried out two controlled burns, one in the northern area, between the towns of Los Raimundos and La Fuente Abad, and another near the Los Gallardos campsite, with the aim of slowing the fire's advance.

At 11 a.m., people staying in a tourist resort on the outskirts of the town of Alfaix were evacuated as a precaution.

Throughout the day, authorities reported that the fire had burned over 5,000 ha (12,000 acres) and remained active, with a large firefighting operation deployed on the ground.

=== 11 July ===
The Andalusian Minister of Emergencies, Antonio Sanz, said that the weak winds and 50% relative humidity opened a "window of opportunity" for firefighters to transition from containment efforts to a direct attack on the flames. Officials said the fire showed signs of easing. The fire grew to at least 6,600 ha (16,000 acres).

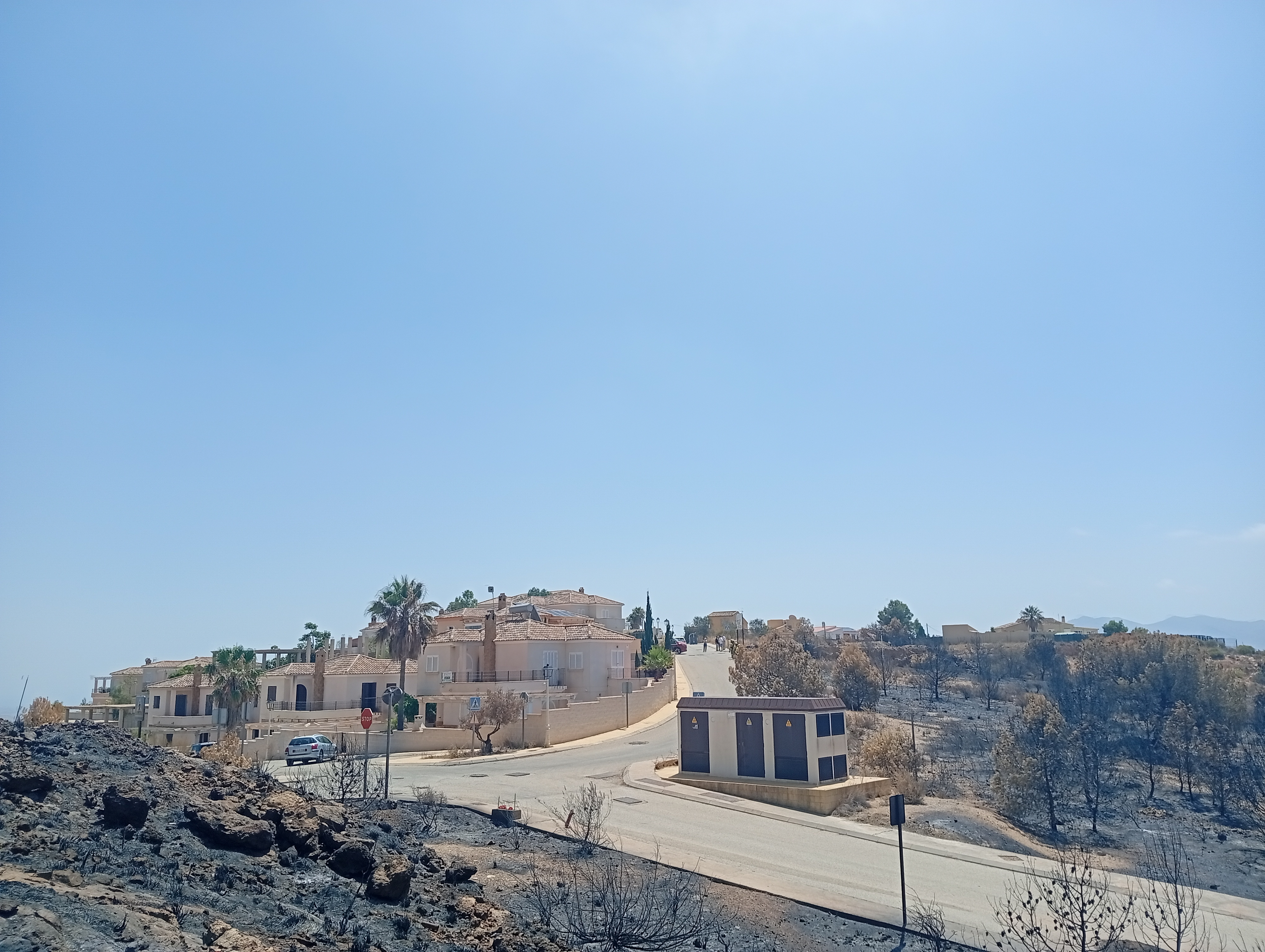
Los Pinos was nearly burned.

=== 12 July ===
Firefighting efforts continued overnight to take advantage of improved weather conditions, characterized by light winds. During the day, several flare-ups were extinguished and the perimeter was secured using drones. That same day, the Andalusian Regional Government declared the fire stabilized, although firefighting and monitoring continued to prevent further flare-ups. The fire still remained active however, with it burning around 7,000 ha (17,000 acres) by the end of the day.

=== 13 July ===
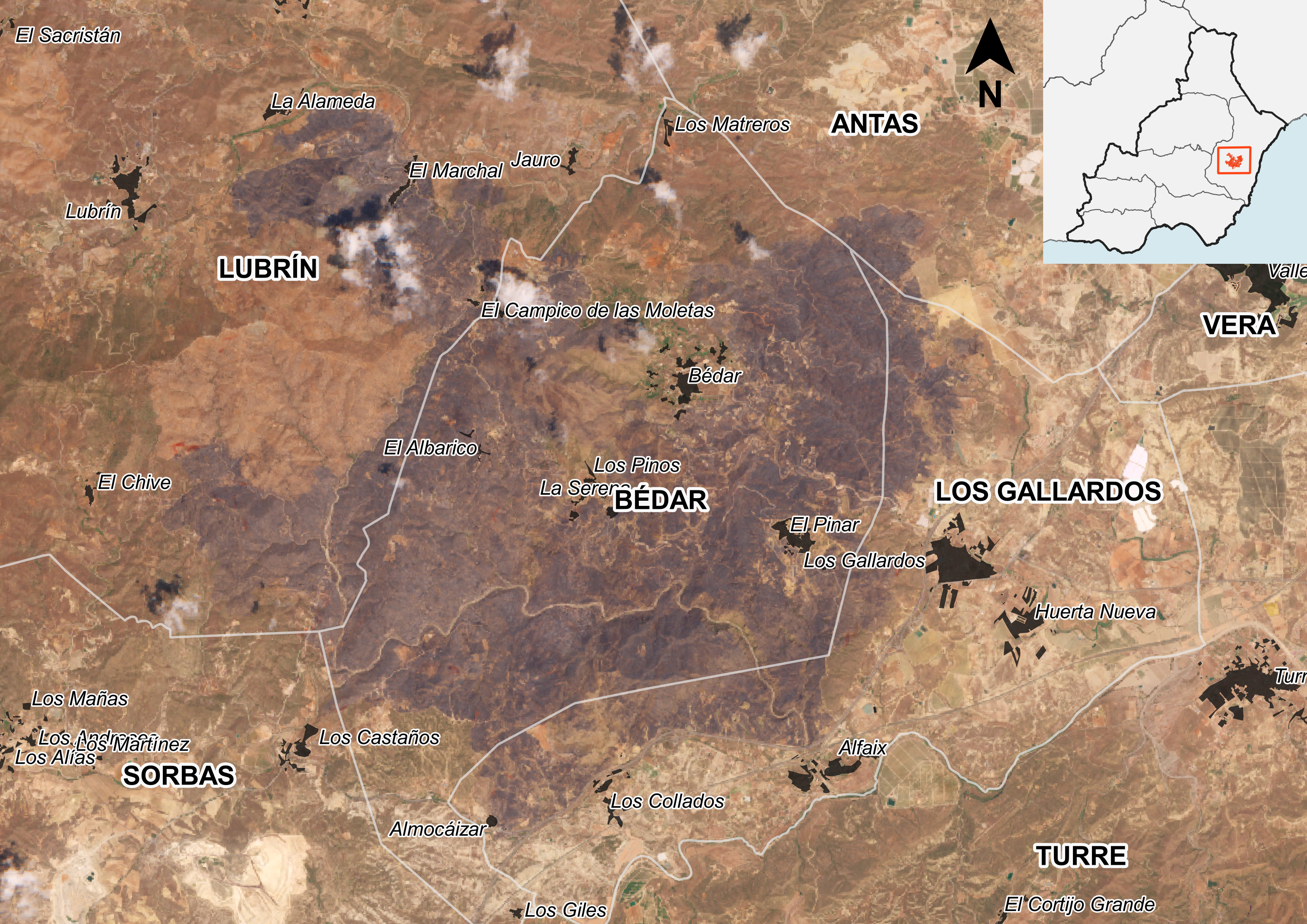
Area burned as seen from imagery by the Copernicus Sentinel-2 L1C satellite (July 13, 2026).

The fire remained stabilized and its perimeter did not expand overnight. Operational efforts focused on surveillance, perimeter consolidation and extinguishing hotspots to prevent flare-ups.

During the morning, Prime Minister Pedro Sánchez and Third Deputy Prime Minister and Minister for Ecological Transition Sara Aagesen visited areas affected by the fire. At the Advanced Command Post, Sánchez held meetings with those in charge of the operation and with representatives of the administrations involved.

=== 14 July ===
A total of 46 firefighters and three fire engines worked to extinguish the blaze. A team of nearly fifty specialists from INFOCA Plan monitored the fire. No significant activity in the fire was detected, although work continues to completely extinguish it. Authorities lifted evacuation orders and allowed residents to return to their homes after the wildfire was stabilised and the alert level was downgraded to the pre-emergency phase.

== Impact ==
The fire led to road closures and the evacuation of more than 1,600 residents. Two people were arrested by the Civil Guard on 11 July for refusing to leave the area evacuated due to the fire. On 12 July, around 600 people that evacuated from the fire zone returned home, with the remaining 1,000 evacuees being able to return in stages as the fire stabilised.

=== Victims ===
Deaths by citizenship
Citizenship	Deaths
United Kingdom	7
Belgium	3
France	1
Spain	1
United States	1
Total	13

The Andalusian regional government initially said six people were killed, but later increased the number to 12. Four people died in a car while eight others died on foot. All but one of the victims were foreign nationals. 18 people were injured when the fire spread to Bédar. Four seriously injured people were airlifted to the Virgen del Rocío Hospital in Seville, while four people were treated at the scene for minor injuries. Regional authorities said on 12 July that a 93-year-old British woman injured in the fire had succumbed to her injuries in hospital, bringing the death toll to 13. Two firefighters were injured on 12 July after their truck suffered an accident in Bédar.

As of July 14, 10 people were reported missing. Many scattered houses could not be reached due to the out-of-control fire, and Civil Guard officers checked affected houses for more victims.

== Reactions ==
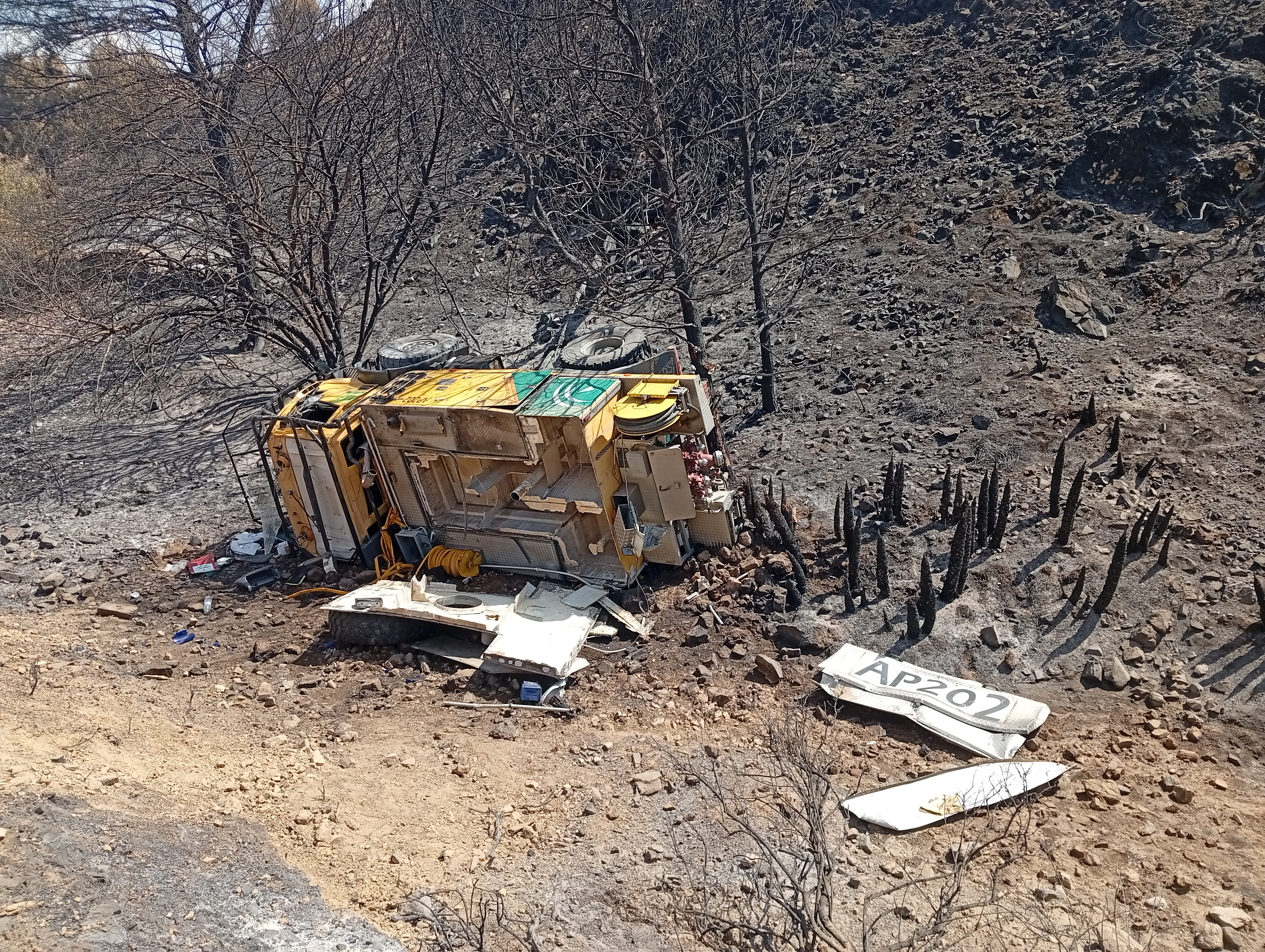
Condition of a rural fire service truck.

The Andalusian Regional Government decreed three days of official mourning for the victims of the fire, with flags being flown at half-mast. A moment of silence was held on 10 July at the main entrance of the Almería Provincial Council building. The U.S. Embassy in Madrid and U.S. Consulate General in Barcelona confirmed they are monitoring the wildfire and urged American citizens to be cautious in threatened areas. Regional emergency chief Antonio Sanz called the deaths "an unprecedented tragedy" and said the pain was "immense". German chancellor Friedrich Merz offered condolences to the victims of the fire. The President of the Regional Government of Andalusia, Juanma Moreno, thanked the firefighting teams. Spanish trade union General Confederation of Labour (CGT) expressed condolences to the families of the victims and wished a speedy recovery for the injured. At the 2026 FIFA World Cup, a minute of silence was observed before the match between Spain and Belgium in the quarterfinals.
