= Garcí Méndez II de Sotomayor =

Castilian noble

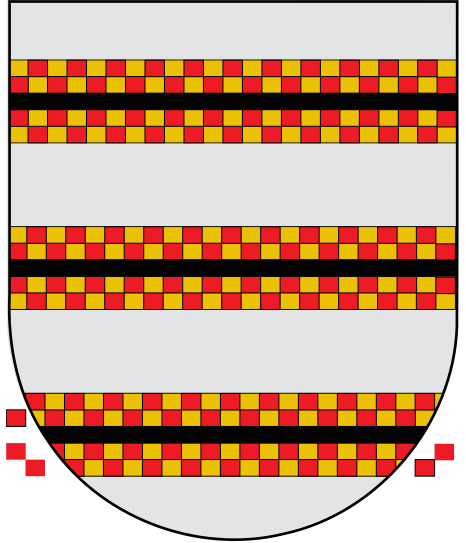
Coat of Arms of the House of Méndez de Sotomayor

García Méndez de Sotomayor or Garcí Méndez II de Sotomayor, the second of his name (1280 – ?) was a Castilian noble and head of the Méndez branch of the House of Sotomayor who founded the Lordship del Castillo de Carpio.

== Family origins ==
The House of Méndez de Sotomayor held title over the Señorio del Castillo de Carpio and the later Marquesado. The family was originally landed with title over Soutomaior, Province of Pontevedra, Galicia founded by Mendo Páez de Sorred, the Ricohombre of King Alfonso VII of León and Castile.

García Méndez was one of the sons of Alfonso García de Sotomayor, III Señor de Sotomayor and his wife Urraca Pires Barroso though it appears that García Méndez did not inherit his father's title over Sotomayor. His paternal grandfather was Garcí Méndez I de Sotomayor, Conquistador de Córdoba.

== Biography ==
In the mid 1200s, Ferdinand III of Castile was involved in a series of Reconquista campaigns against the Caliphate of Córdoba and other minor Christian and Moorish territories in the area around El Carpio, Andalucía, Province of Córdoba as a part of his campaign for Alcocer (Al-Qusayr). After victory in this campaign in 1240, Ferdinand III divvied the land up between the Castilian crown and the nobles who took part in the campaign as Señorios and other titles tied to the Castilian crown. Heavily involved in the fighting, the House of Sotomayor was awarded much of the land principally in the area around El Carpio. By 1325, the Sotomayor lands, passed down by various family members, were collected and amassed by García Méndez de Sotomayor who was responsible for the founding of the Lordship del Castillo de Carpio. The foundation of the Señorio is generally placed at 1325, the year that the tower at El Carpio was completed. The tower and its surrounding fortifications would serve as the center of administration for the Señorio and the Marquesado of Carpio until the title became associated with the Dukes of Alba.

== Marriage and descendants ==
García Méndez married Juana Rodríguez de Jodar and the couple had 5 children:

- Garci Méndez de Sotomayor, II Señor del Castillo de Carpio (b. 1310) - who went on to become the II Señor del Castillo de Carpio.
- Alfonso García de Sotomayor - birthdate unknown, possibly older than brother Garci Méndez
- Sancho García de Sotomayor
- Ruy Méndez de Sotomayor
- María Méndez de Sotomayor

Preceded by Title Created	I Señor del Carpio; 1325–?	Succeeded by Garci Méndez de Sotomayor

== See also ==
- Lordship del Castillo de Carpio
