= Mendo Páez de Sorred =

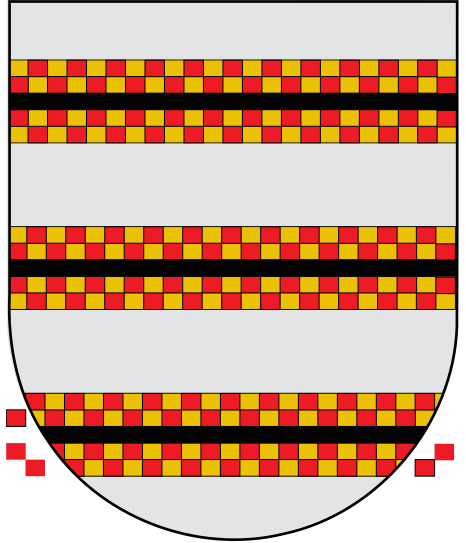
Coat of Arms of the House of Sotomayor.

Mendo Páez de Sorrez or Mendo Páez de Sorred or Men Páez Sorred or Mem Páez Sorred (b. c. 1070 or 1180 - d. c. 1230) was a Spanish noble in the service of the Kingdom of Galicia and by default, also the Kingdom of Castile. He was the head of the House of Sorrez and is best known for founding the House of Sotomayor by initiating the population of the Valle de Soto.

== Day of Birth and Death ==
There is some confusion about his birth and death dates. Some sources record Mendo Páez as having been born in 1070. This is somewhat early as a birthdate, as he would have been 88 when he began serving Alfonso VIII. There are records of his service both to Alfonso VII (Reigning from 1126 to 1157) and Alfonso VIII (Reigning from 31 August 1158 – 5 October 1214). Other sources put his birthdate at 1180 which is an impossibility given the prior records of service. His death day which is recorded by some sources as taking place in 1230 is also extremely unlikely.

== Family Origins ==
Mendo Páez Sorrez was born into the House of Sorrez of House of Sorred, a family from Galicia. He was the son of Payo Méndez de Sorrez and his Portuguese wife, Elvira Godins de Lanhoso. His paternal grandfather was Garci Méndez Sorrez and his paternal grandmother was Urraca de Ron. His maternal grandfather was Godinho Fafes de Lanhoso, Senhor de Lanhoso and his maternal grandmother was Dórdia Viegas, Senhora da Quinta de Sequeiros.

The House of Sotomayor, founded by Mendo Páez would go on to produce some of the greatest leaders throughout Spanish history. The cadet branch of the family, the House of Méndez de Sotomayor would also rise to power in the 1400s before merging with the House of Haro.

== Biography ==
Mendo Páez de Sorrez was recorded as being a Ricohombre in the service of King Alfonso VII of León and Castile el emperador. An award awarded to Mendo after his participation in Alonso VII's Conquest of Almería from the Moors. Mendo Páez also went on to serve King Alfonso VIII of Castile. At some point, Mendo Páez was given the mandate to populate the area of the Valle de Soto in Galicia. With this landed establishment of lordship over the Señorio de Sotomayor, Mendo Páez took the land's name as his own surname as was tradition to become Mendo Páez Sorrez de Sotomayor.

== Marriage and descendants ==
Mendo Páez married Inés Pérez de Ambía, the daughter of Pedro Pais de Ambia, Senhor de Lobios and head of the Portuguese House of Ambia in Galicia and his wife, Maria Ferandes Fernandes de Lima. The couple had three children:

- Teresa Méndez Sorrez de Sotomayor (b. 1310) - Married Fernán Arias de Saavedra, Head of house and X Señor de Saavedra.
- Payo Gómez Sorrez de Sotomayor - Almirante de Castilla, I Señor de Rianxo, II Señor de Sotomayor, married María de Mendoza.
- Pedro Méndez de Sotomayor - Bishop of Orense.

Preceded by Title Created	I Señor de Sotomayor ?–1230	Succeeded by Payo Gómez Sorrez de Sotomayor

== See also ==
- House of Méndez de Sotomayor
- House of Sotomayor
- Señorio del Castillo de Carpio
- Marquesado del Carpio
