= Marquess of Carpio =

Hereditary title in the Peerage of Spain

Marquessate of Carpio
- Creation date: 20 January 1559
- Created by: Philip II
- Peerage: Peerage of Spain
- First holder: Diego López de Haro y Sotomayor, 1st Marquess of Carpio
- Present holder: Carlos Fitz-James Stuart y Martínez de Irujo, 17th Marquess of Carpio

Marquess of Carpio (Spanish: Marqués del Carpio) is a hereditary title in the Peerage of Spain accompanied by the dignity of Grandee, granted in 1559 by Philip II to Diego López de Haro, Lord of Carpio, veintiquatro and first chief of the Royal Stables of Córdoba.

The title holds dominion and lordship over what is roughly the area of El Carpio in the area of Andalucía, Province of Córdoba, and was at times also tied to the Señorios of Lobrín and Sorbes. The title lends its name to the House of Carpio.

== History ==
The Marquessate of Carpio has its origins in the Señorio del Castillo de Carpio which was founded in 1325 by García Méndez de Sotomayor.

The Marquesado del Carpio was originally tied to the title of a Grande de España granted by King Philip II of Spain in 1559. The title was bestowed upon Diego Lopez de Haro y Sotomayor on 20 January 1559 in recognition of his services to the crown, however the Grandeeship may have been revoked or not inherited at some point along the line as another Grandeeship was conferred onto the Marquesado by King Philip IV of Spain in 1640 which was granted to Diego de Haro y Haro, 5th Marquess of Carpio and Count of Morente.

It is further unclear whether the first Marquess of Carpio was in fact Diego López de Haro y Sotomayor. Some sources record Diego López as the I Marques and others record Diego López' father Luis Méndez de Haro y Sotomayor as the I Marques. What does appear clear is that Luis Méndez was indeed the 9th Señor del Carpio inheriting the title from his parents and that his son Diego López was also the Marques. Whether the title was conferred upon the 9th or 10th Señor del Carpio appears to be the main question. Luis Méndez inherited the Señorio del Carpio from his mother Beatriz Portocarrero Cárdenas in 1528 according to Margarita Cabrera Sánchez. If the date of the upgrade to a Marquesado is accurately put at 1559, it would seem that the first Marques of Carpio was indeed Diego López de Haro y Sotomayor which is backed by the Real Academia de la Historia.

== Marquesses of Carpio (1559) ==
- Diego López de Haro y Sotomayor, 1st Marquess of Carpio
- María de Haro y Sotomayor, 2nd Marchioness of Carpio
- Diego López de Haro Sotomayor y Córdoba, 3rd Marquess of Carpio
- Beatriz de Haro y Sotomayor, 4th Marchioness of Carpio
- Diego López de Haro y Sotomayor, 5th Marquess of Carpio
- Luis Méndez de Haro y Guzmán, 6th Marquess of Carpio
- Gaspar Méndez de Haro y Guzmán, 7th Marquess of Carpio

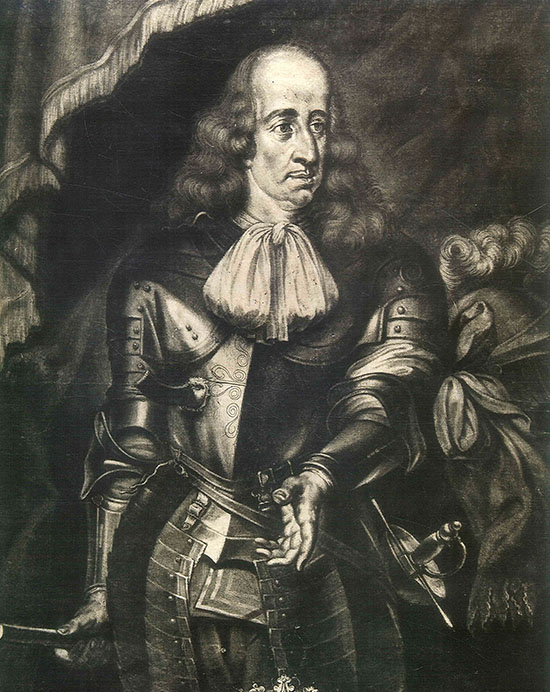
Engraving of the 7th Marquess of Carpio, 1666

- Catalina de Haro y Guzmán, 8th Marchioness of Carpio
- María Teresa Álvarez de Toledo y Haro, 9th Marchioness of Carpio
- Fernando de Silva y Álvarez de Toledo, 10th Marquess of Carpio
- María Cayetana de Silva y Álvarez de Toledo, 11th Marchioness of Carpio
- Carlos Miguel Fitz-James Stuart y Silva, 12th Marquess of Carpio
- Jacobo Fitz-James Stuart y Ventimiglia, 13th Marquess of Carpio
- Carlos María Fitz-James Stuart y Portocarrero, 14th Marquess of Carpio
- Jacobo Fitz-James Stuart y Falcó, 15th Marquess of Carpio
- Cayetana Fitz-James Stuart y Silva, 16th Marchioness of Carpio
- Carlos Fitz-James Stuart y Martínez de Irujo, 17th Marquess of Carpio

== See also ==
- Señorio del Castillo de Carpio
- List of current grandees of Spain
