= Royal Stables =

Royal Stables may refer to:

- Royal Mews, United Kingdom
- Royal Stables (Denmark)
- Royal Stables (France)
- Royal Stables (Netherlands)
- Royal Stables (Sweden)
- Royal Stables of Córdoba, Spain
