= Bédar to Garrucha Railway =

Former mining railway in Spain

The Bédar to Garrucha Railway was a mining railway in the Almeria province of Spain.

The mining areas in the late 19th century around Bédar were initially served by a series of aerial cableways which transported ore to ships at Garrucha. As the mines expanded, this mode of transport limited the ability to export ore, and therefore the Bédar to Garrucha Railway was proposed to provide greater capacity. The railway was authorised by a law of 4 March 1887 which declared it a public utility for the transport of minerals.

Construction of the railway was a condition of an 1894 mining lease to Víctor Chávarri, who enlisted the support of the English vice consul of Almería in Garrucha, George Clifton Pecket. Together with Auguste Lecoq, a company “Chávarri, Lecoq y Cía” was set up to build the railway.

The railway was completed in 1896 and continued in operation until 1923 when mining production was suspended.

== Route ==
The railway was about 17.5 km long from Garrucha to Bédar and ascended 234m from its sea level terminus at Garrucha to Bédar. It had two branch lines totalling more than 4 km which converged on the “Tres Amigos” ore loading station: the Mulata (1.6 km) and Santa Catalina (2.5 km) lines. There were also four inclined planes, each connecting a different mining area.

== Infrastructure ==
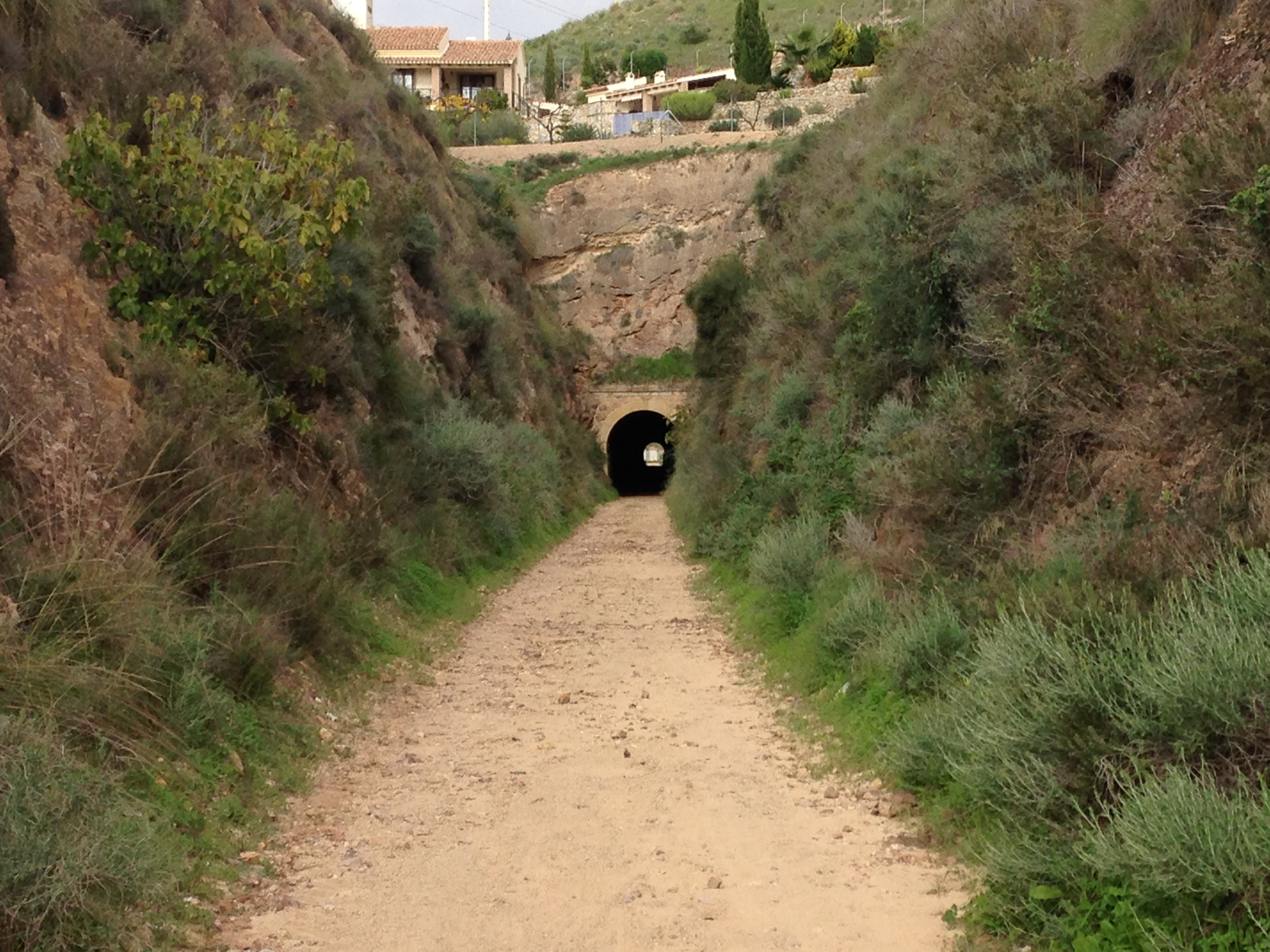
Servalico Tunnel on the Santa Catalina branch

The railway was part of a large complex of mineral mining infrastructure, including mines, cableways and railways. The principal infrastructure works of the railway were:

- The 43m Boliche tunnel
- The 200m Servalico tunnel on the Santa Catalina branch
- Bridges and embankments, particularly crossing ravines, including a 17m high buttressed stone wall at La Tejera
- Lineside ‘guard houses’
- A locomotive shed at Garrucha and another on the Santa Catalina branch
- The Tres Amigos loading dock or hopper where ore from various mines was consolidated from the mines and loaded for transport to the coast
- The Garrucha unloading dock or hopper where ore was unloaded for trans-shipment from railway to ships.

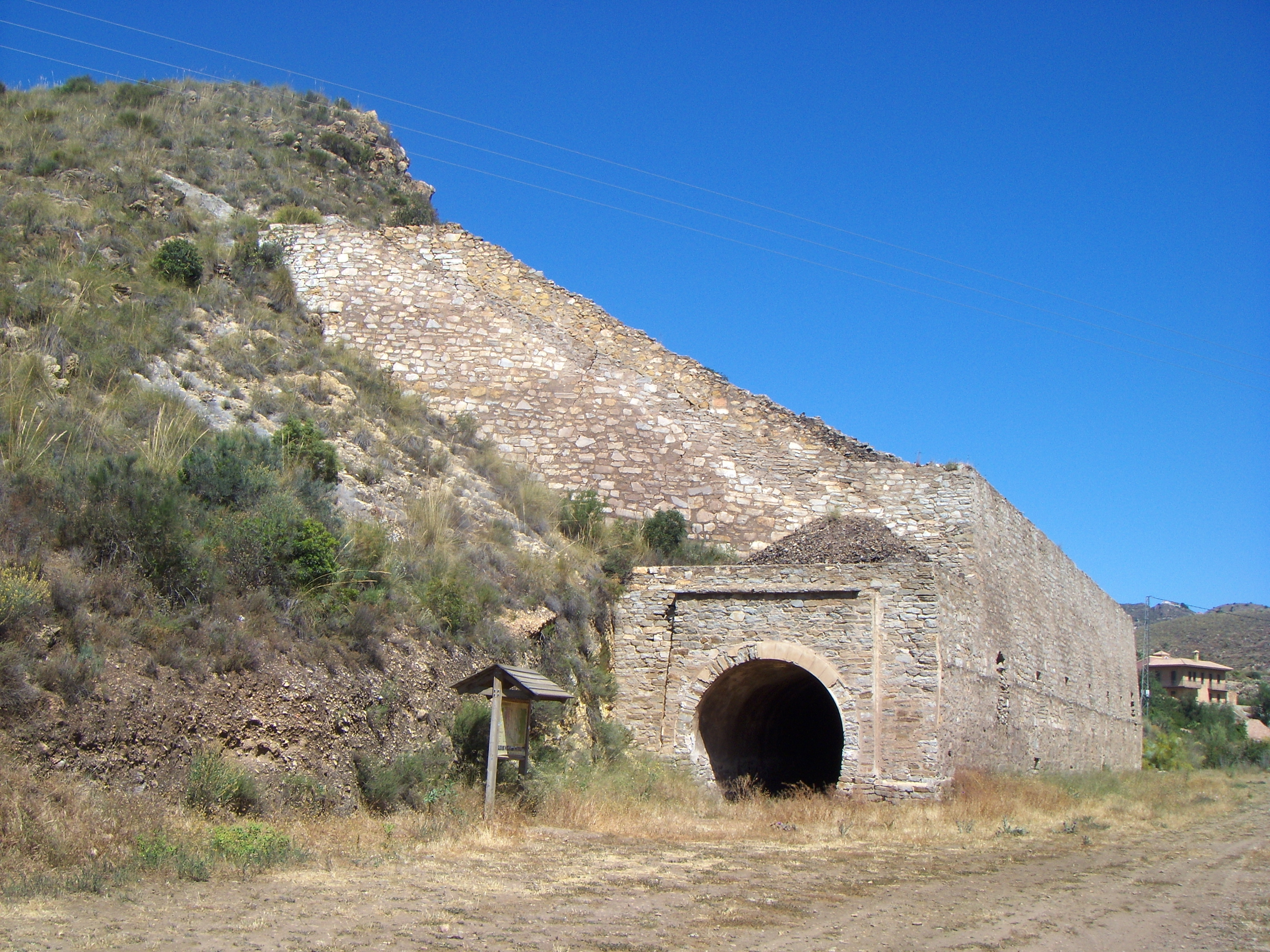
The ore loading dock at Tres Amigos, Bedar

The main line track was 3 foot 3 inch (or 1 metre) gauge and laid with 60 lb (30 kg) rail, whereas the sidings used 15 kg rail. On the Mulata and Santa Catalina branches, 30 kg rail was also used, again with 15 kg rail in the sidings.

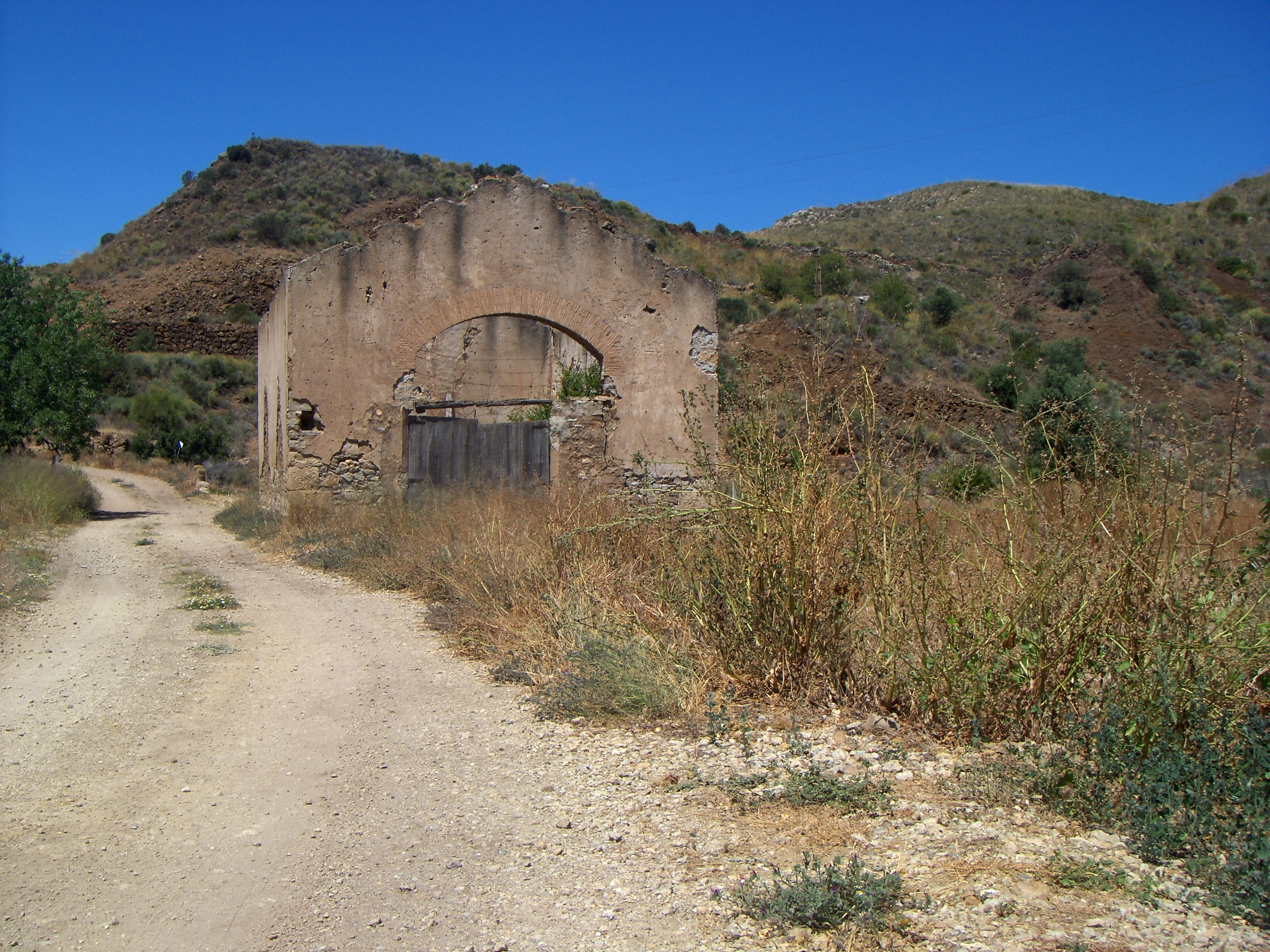
Locomotive shed on the Santa Catalina branch

== Rolling Stock ==
The principal motive power on the main line was provided by three 0-6-0T, 30 ton locomotives from the company Saint-Léonard of Liege, Belgium, designated model 7AC, with works numbers 993-995, delivered in 1895 as numbers 1, 2 and 3 and named Garruchera, Mojaquera and Bedarena. No.993 was later moved to Carbones de Berga SA, who operated mines in the Figols area, Barcelona and No.995 to Minas y Ferrocarrils de Utrillas a Zaragoza.

For the branch lines, Saint-Léonard supplied two 0-4-0T, 10 ton locomotives, designated 9CE, works numbers 989 (1894) named Mulata and 992 (1895) named Santa Catalina.

A 1922 Deutz series C XIV F 10 hp diesel locomotive, works number 4224, named Ximpún is also recorded as working on the railway.

The main route of the railway had a fleet of fifty 8 ton hopper wagons, supplemented by fifty 3.5 ton hopper wagons on the branch lines. A ten-seater passenger vehicle, attached to trains as required, provided transport for workers.

== External links and bibliography ==
- https://www.faydon.com/Bedar/Bedar.html
- https://farodebedar.com/
- Gómez Martínez, José Antonio & Coves Navarro, José Vicente: Trenes, cables y minas de Almería. Spain: Instituto de Estudios Almerienses, 1994
