= Diego López de Haro y Sotomayor =

Spanish noble

Arms of the House of Haro.

Diego López de Haro y Sotomayor (1515–1578) was a Spanish noble holding the titles of Señor Lubrín y Sorbas, Almería and 10th Señor del Carpio, a title which was elevated to 1st Marques del Carpio in 1559 by Philip II of Spain.

== Family ==
As a member of the House of Haro, Diego López was the son of Luis Méndez de Haro y Sotomayor, 9th Señor del Carpio and Señor de Sorbas and Lubrín and his second wife, Beatriz Portocarrero. His paternal grandfather was Diego López de Haro 8th Señor del Carpio, and Señor of Busto, Revilla, Sorbas and Lubrín and governor of Galicia, from whom his father inherited the title of Señorio del Carpio and the Señorios of Lubrín and Sorbas, and his paternal grandmother was Beatriz de Sotomayor, daughter of Luis Méndez de Sotomayor, 7th Señor del Carpio.

Diego López was the title holder of the Señorio del Carpio, being the 10th Señor when King Philip II of Spain elevated the Señorio to a Marquesado on 20 January 1559 a title which was also granted Grandeeship of Spain. Later in 1559, King Philip II of Spain granted Diego López the Villa de Carboneras.

== Marriage and descendants ==
Diego López married María Angela de Velasco de la Cueva, daughter of Cristóbal de la Cueva y Velasco, Señor de Roa and the couple had 2 children:

- María López de Haro - II Marquesa del Carpio, Señora de Las Villas de Adamuz, Morente y Pedro Abad, and Málaga, who married Francisco Fernández de Córdoba
- Beatriz López de Haro Sotomayor - who married her paternal uncle, Luis Méndez de Haro Portocarrero

== See also ==
- House of Haro
- House of Méndez de Sotomayor

Preceded by Luis Méndez de Haro y Sotomayor	X Señor del Carpio ? – 20 January 1559	Succeeded by Title upgraded to Marquesado

Preceded by Title Created	I Marquess of Carpio; 20 January 1559 – 1582	Succeeded by María de Haro y Haro
