= Caldron (heraldry) =

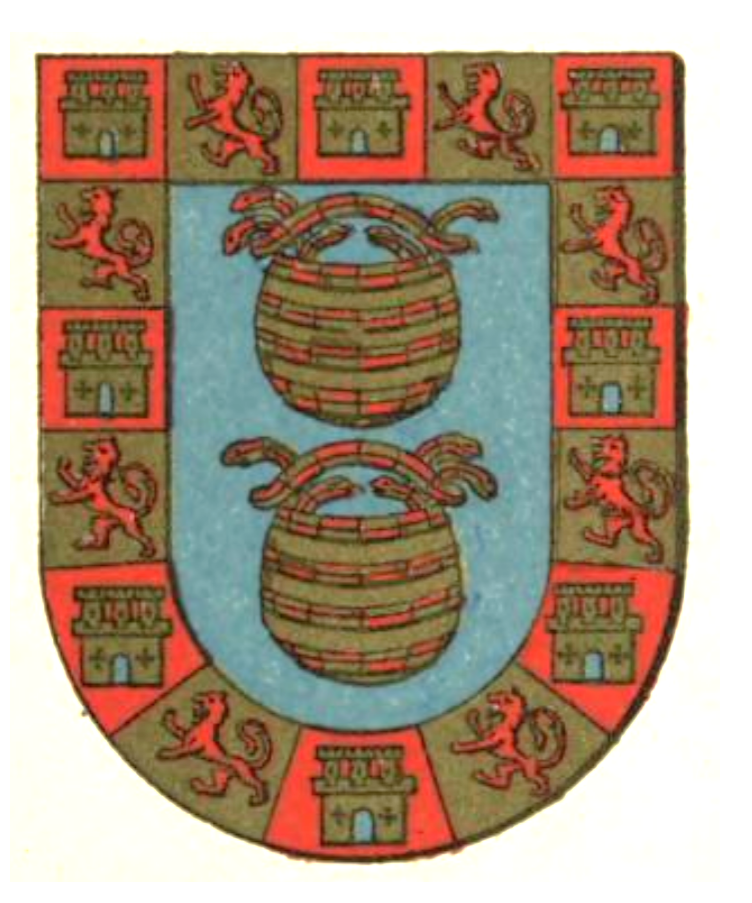
Coat of arms with caldrons (House of Guzmán)

In heraldry, a caldron (also known as cooking-pot) charge can be frequently found in the coats of arms of prominent Spanish nobility. This is related to a tradition of king granting a pennon and caldron (Spanish: peñon y caldera) upon admittance to the upper crust of nobility, the ricohombres. Woodward & Burnett suggest to count the caldron among the military charges, as pennon was related to the ability of a noble to raise and lead troops, and caldron represented the ability to feed them.

Caldron frequently issues multiple serpents (also can be interpreted as eels), forming the so-called Spanish: caldera gringolada.

== Sources ==
- Woodward, John; Burnett, George (1892). A treatise on heraldry British and foreign : with English and French glossaries. Vol. 1. Edinburgh: W. & A.K. Johnston. OCLC 1158009054.
- Rines, G.E. (1909). The United Editors Perpetual Encyclopedia: A Library of Universal Knowledge Combined with an Unabridged Dictionary of the English Language. Vol. 26. United editors association.
- Dillon, J.T. (1788). The History of the Reign of Peter the Cruel, King of Castile and Leon. Vol. 1. W. Richardson.
