= Gaspar Méndez de Haro, 7th Marquess of Carpio =

Spanish political figure and art collector

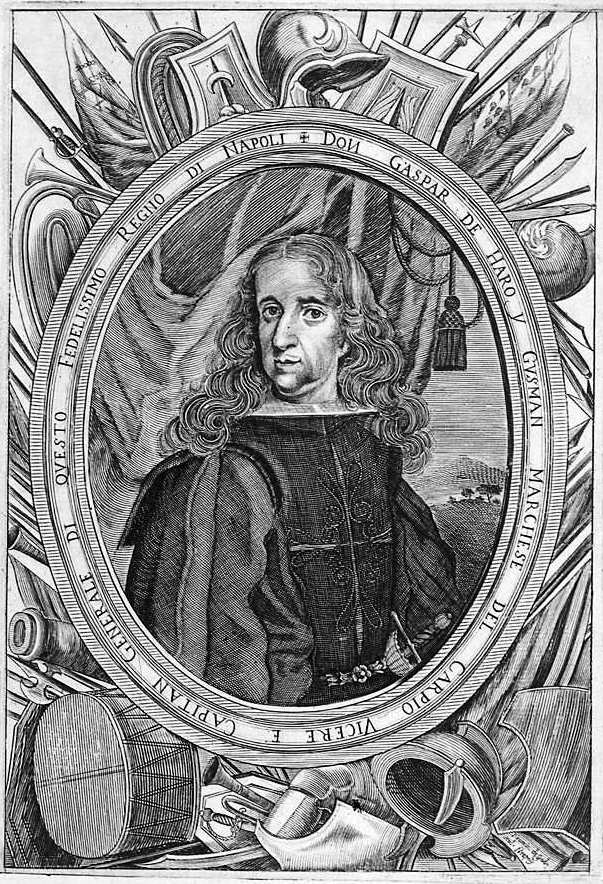
Gaspar Méndez de Haro

Gaspar Méndez de Haro y Fernández de Córdoba, or Gaspar de Haro y Guzmán(1 June 1629 – 16 November 1687), 7th Marquess of Carpio GE, was a Spanish political figure and art collector.

== Family ==
Coat of Arms of the Marquesses of Carpio

He was the first son of Luis Méndez de Haro and Catalina Fernández de Córdoba y Aragón, the youngest daughter of Enrique Fernández de Córdoba Cardona y Aragón and Catalina Fernández de Córdoba-Figueroa y Enríquez de Ribera.

== Political career ==
His father Luis Mendez de Haro had succeeded his uncle, Gaspar de Guzmán, Count-Duke of Olivares as Valido of Spain.

Gaspar had the ambition to follow in his father's footsteps, but was frustrated in his ambitions. He was then suspected to be behind a plan to kill the King by blowing up the Buen Retiro Palace. As a punishment, he was sent to Portugal to fight the insurgents, where he was made prisoner after the defeat at Montes Claros. In 1677, he was rehabilitated and sent to Rome as ambassador, until July 1682. He then became Viceroy of Naples, then a Spanish possession, until his death in 1687.

Gaspar de Haro is buried in the pantheon of the Count-Dukes of San Lúcar and Olivares at Loeches near Madrid.

== Art collection ==
Gaspar Mendez de Haro was a renowned art collector. During his stay in Rome his agent, Antonio Saurer negotiated in Venice the acquisition of important works of art. When he died in 1687, he had a collection of an estimated 3000 paintings, 1200 in Spain and the rest in Naples.

His collection included:

- the Rokeby Venus by Diego Velázquez
- the Magdalene by Titian
- several paintings by Tintoretto
- Christ Crowned with Thorns by Antonello da Messina (now in the Metropolitan Museum of Art)

He also engaged Bernini to make a copy of the Fontana dei Quattro Fiumi on the Piazza Navona in Rome, to be placed in Naples.

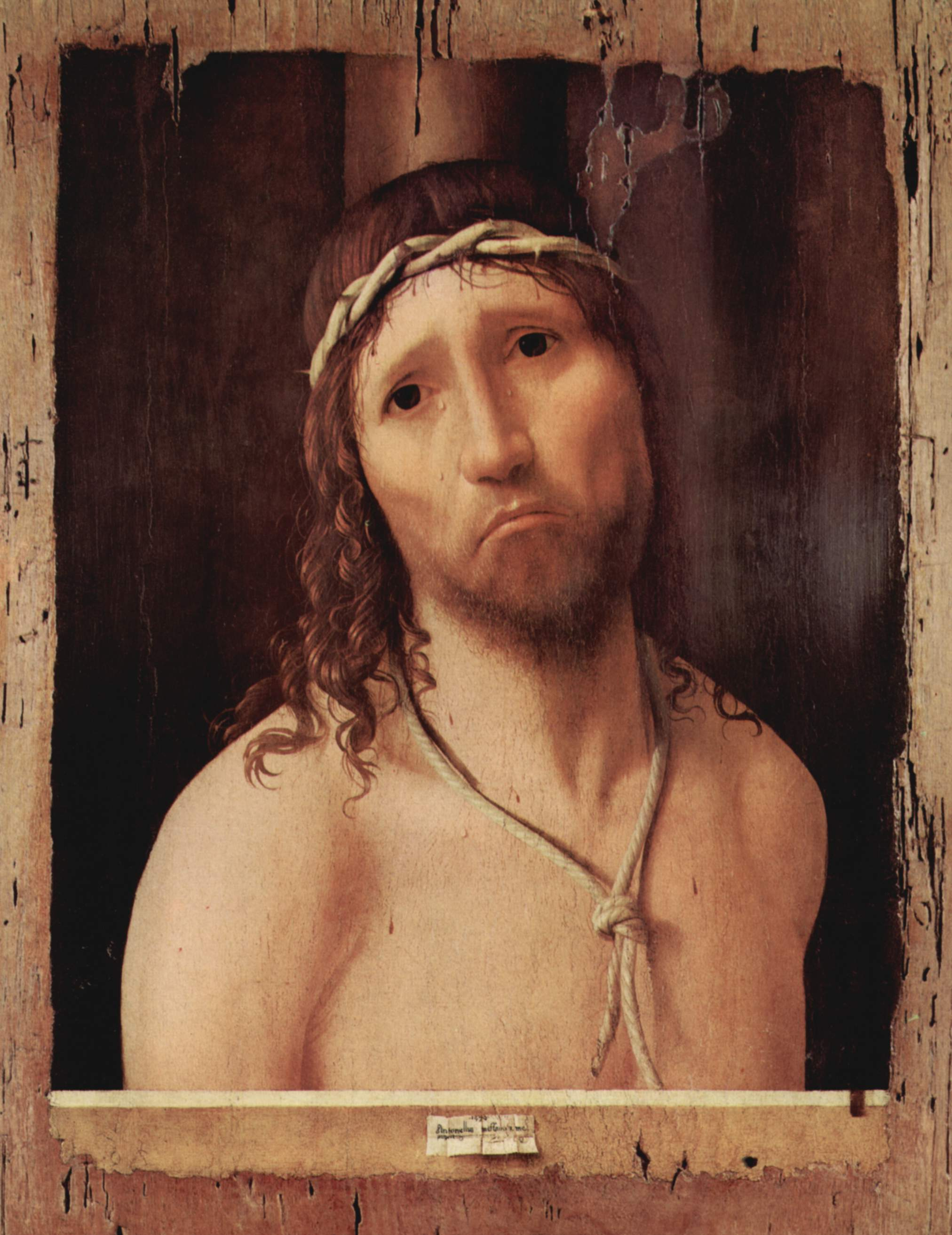
Ecce Homo by Antonello da Messina (1475)

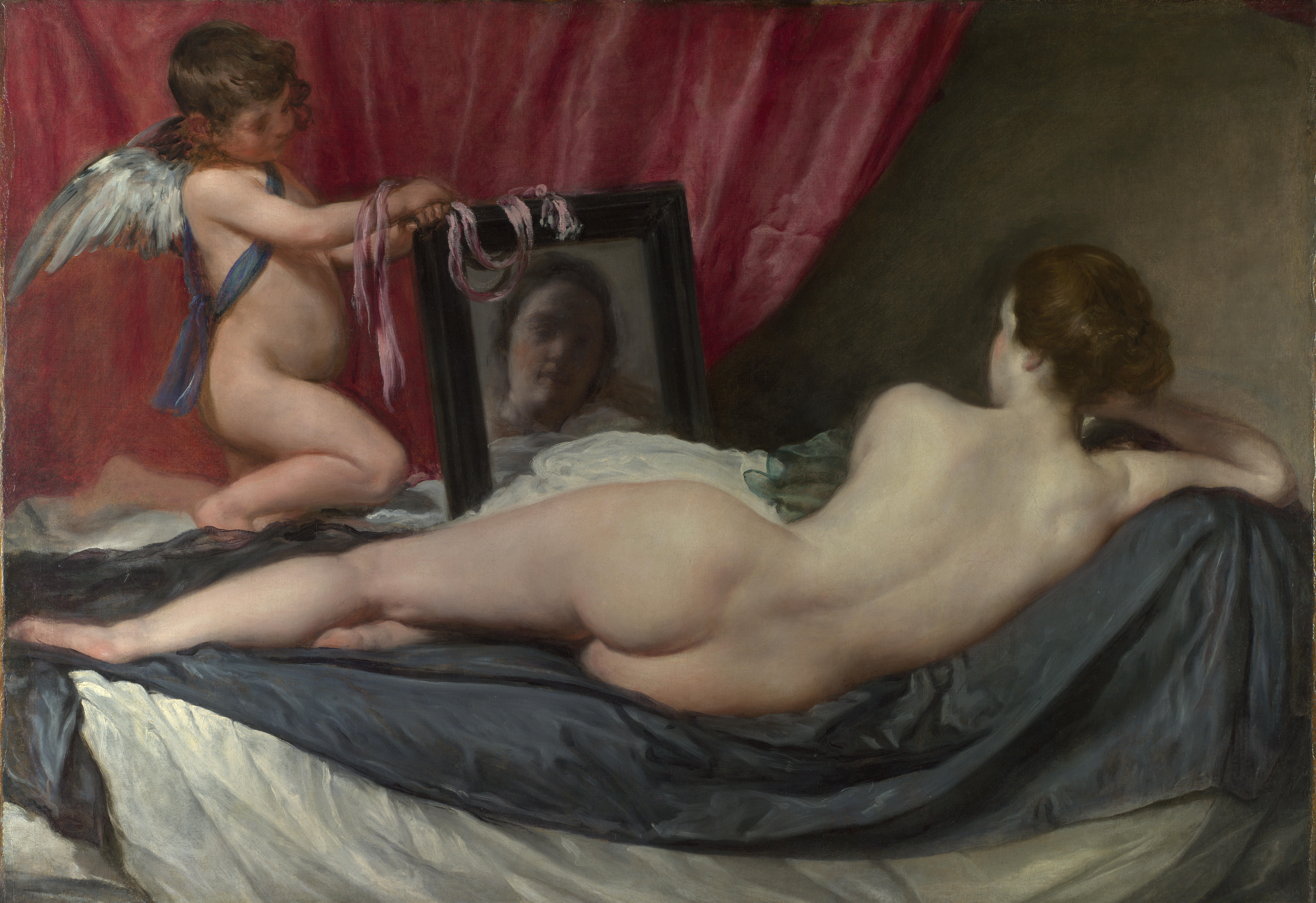
Rokeby Venus by Diego Velázquez (1647)

== Marriages and Issues ==
He first married Antonia de la Cerda Enríquez de Ribera y Portocarrero, daughter of Antonio de la Cerda, 7th Duke of Medinaceli, deceased in January 1670.

On 11 June 1671, he married Teresa Enriquez de Cabrera, daughter of Juan Gaspar Enríquez de Cabrera y Sandoval, 6th Duke of Medina de Rioseco. They had one daughter :

- Catalina de Haro (1672-1733), who later married Francisco Álvarez de Toledo, 10th Duke of Alba, taking much of his art collection into the Alba collection. They also had one daughter, María Teresa Álvarez de Toledo (1691–1755).

His wife, Teresa Enríquez de Cabrera y Alvarez de Toledo, a widow since 1687, married again on 20 June 1688 Joaquín Ponce de León Lencastre, 7th Duke of Arcos, but there was no issue from this marriage. She died in 1716.

== Titles and honors ==
- Don
- 7th Marquess of Carpio
- 6th Count and 4th Duke of Olivares
- 4th Marquess of Eliche
- Gran Commander of the Order of Alcántara
- 2nd Duke of Montoro

== Sources ==
- Hobbs, Nicolas (2007). "Grandes de España" (in Spanish). Archived from the original on 2006-11-29.
- Instituto de Salazar y Castro. Elenco de Grandezas y Titulos Nobiliarios Españoles (in Spanish). periodic publication.
- El Marqués del Carpio
- Beatrice Cacciotti, 'La collezione del VII marchese del Carpio tra Roma e Madrid', in: Boletino d'Arte 86-87 (1994), pp. 133–196. (On Haro y Guzman's art collection)

Government offices
Preceded by Fernando Fajardo y Álvarez de Toledo	Viceroy of Naples; 1683–1687	Succeeded by Francisco de Benavides
Spanish nobility
Preceded by Luis Méndez de Haro	VII Marquess of Carpio; 1661–1687	Succeeded by Catalina de Haro
