= El Carpio =

- Municipality
- Flag Seal

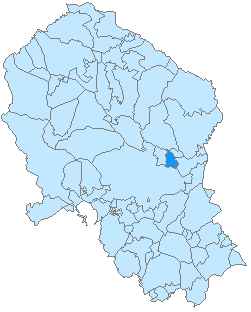
- Coordinates: 37°56′N 4°30′W
- Country: Spain
- Province: Córdoba
- Municipality: El Carpio

Area
  - Total: 47 km^{2} (18 sq mi)
- Elevation: 138 m (453 ft)

Population (2025-01-01)
  - Total: 4,327
  - Density: 92/km^{2} (240/sq mi)
- Time zone: UTC+1 (CET)
  - Summer (DST): UTC+2 (CEST)
- Website: www.ayunelcarpio.es

El Carpio is a municipality located in the province of Córdoba, Spain. According to the 2006 census (INE), the city has a population of 4,477 inhabitants.

== History ==
El Carpio was tied to the Kingdom of Castile as early as the 1300s when the Señorio del Castillo de Carpio was founded in 1325 by Garcí Méndez II de Sotomayor.

The Señorio del Castillo de Carpio was elevated to the level of the Marquesado del Carpio granted by King Philip II of Spain in 1559. The title was bestowed upon Diego Lopez de Haro y Sotomayor on 20 January 1559 in recognition of his services to the crown. Grandeeship was conferred onto the Marquesado by King Philip IV of Spain in 1640 which was granted to Diego de Haro y Haro, V Marques del Carpio and Conde de Morente.

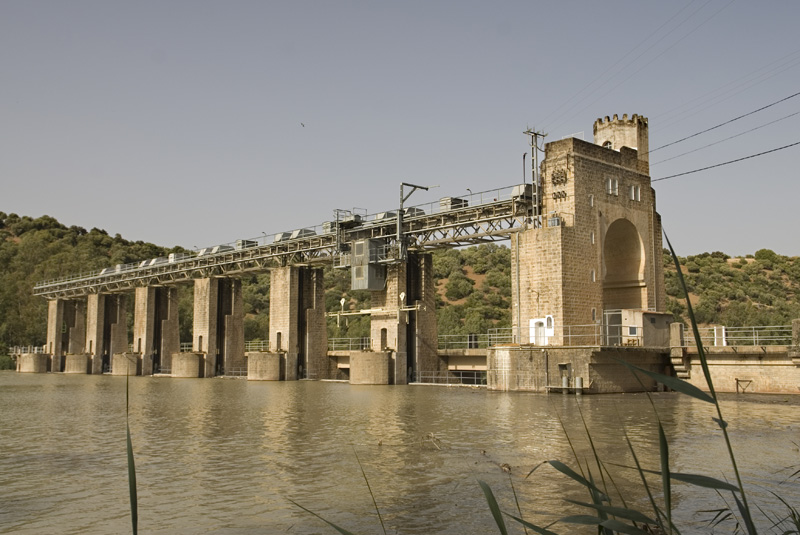
Dam and hydroelectric power plant El Salto, in El Carpio.

== See also ==
- Señorio del Castillo de Carpio
- Marquesado del Carpio
- List of municipalities in Córdoba
