= Antas, Spain =

Antas
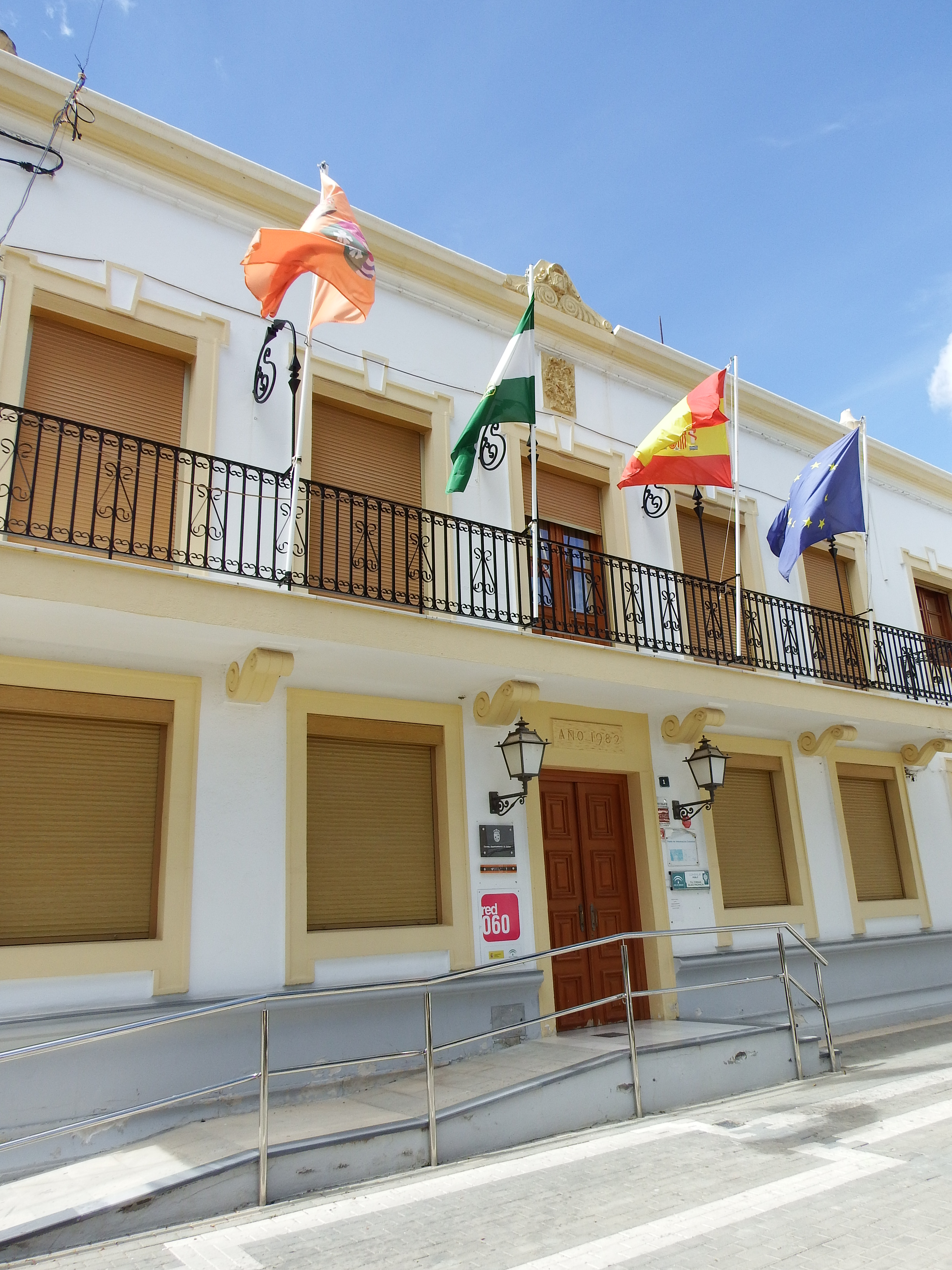

- Flag Coat of arms

- Location in Spain.
- Coordinates: 37°14′N 1°55′W
- Country: Spain
- Community: Andalusia
- province: Almería
- Comarca: Levante Almeriense

Government
  - Mayor: Pedro Ridao Zamora

Area
  - Total: 100 km^{2} (39 sq mi)
- Elevation: 108 m (354 ft)

Population (2025-01-01)
  - Total: 3,472
  - Density: 35/km^{2} (90/sq mi)
- Demonym: Antenses
- Time zone: UTC+1 (CET)
  - Summer (DST): UTC+2 (CEST)
- Website: Official website

Antas is a municipality in the province of Almería, in the autonomous community of Andalusia, Spain.

The mountains of the Filabres roll down in undulating slopes at their north eastern end and here, on a fertile plain, lies Antas. The river, now usually dry, has carved a ravine through the soft sandstone, where birds nest in the holes in the cliffs. All around Antas there are numerous large orange and lemon groves, and other fruits and vegetables are grown on this highly cultivated area. The local market is known in the area for the quality of its produce.

During the 1960s, the male population in Antas far exceeded the female one. Spinsters and widows were brought in from the province of Murcia and duly integrated into the society.

== Main sights ==
Antas was the centre of the El Argar prehistoric culture. The remains of Neolithic and Bronze Age man can be seen in various protected sites around the town. Roman and Medieval remains have also been found here, such as the remains of an aqueduct that lie beside the road on the outskirts of the town.

The Hermitage of the “Virgin of the Cabeza” is dedicated to the Patron Saint of Antas and lies outside the town on the top of a hill. It dates probably from the 16th century and was built in the shape of a vaulted Latin cross.

== Culture ==
The main celebration of the locality is the fiesta of the Virgin of the same name and on 8 September every year her image is taken from the church to the Hermitage where she is offered floral tributes after the pilgrimage. In the middle of Lent, the people of Antas also celebrate spring with the pagan ritual of “killing the old women”, they gather on the nearby hillside called the Ridge of María and animated by the town band, proceed to throw sweets at the local grandmothers.

Another event in the calendar of Antas are the fiestas held around 15 August.

== See also ==
- List of municipalities in Almería
