= Royal Stables of Córdoba =

16th century stables in Córdoba, Spain

Coordinates: 37.8767°N 4.7827°W

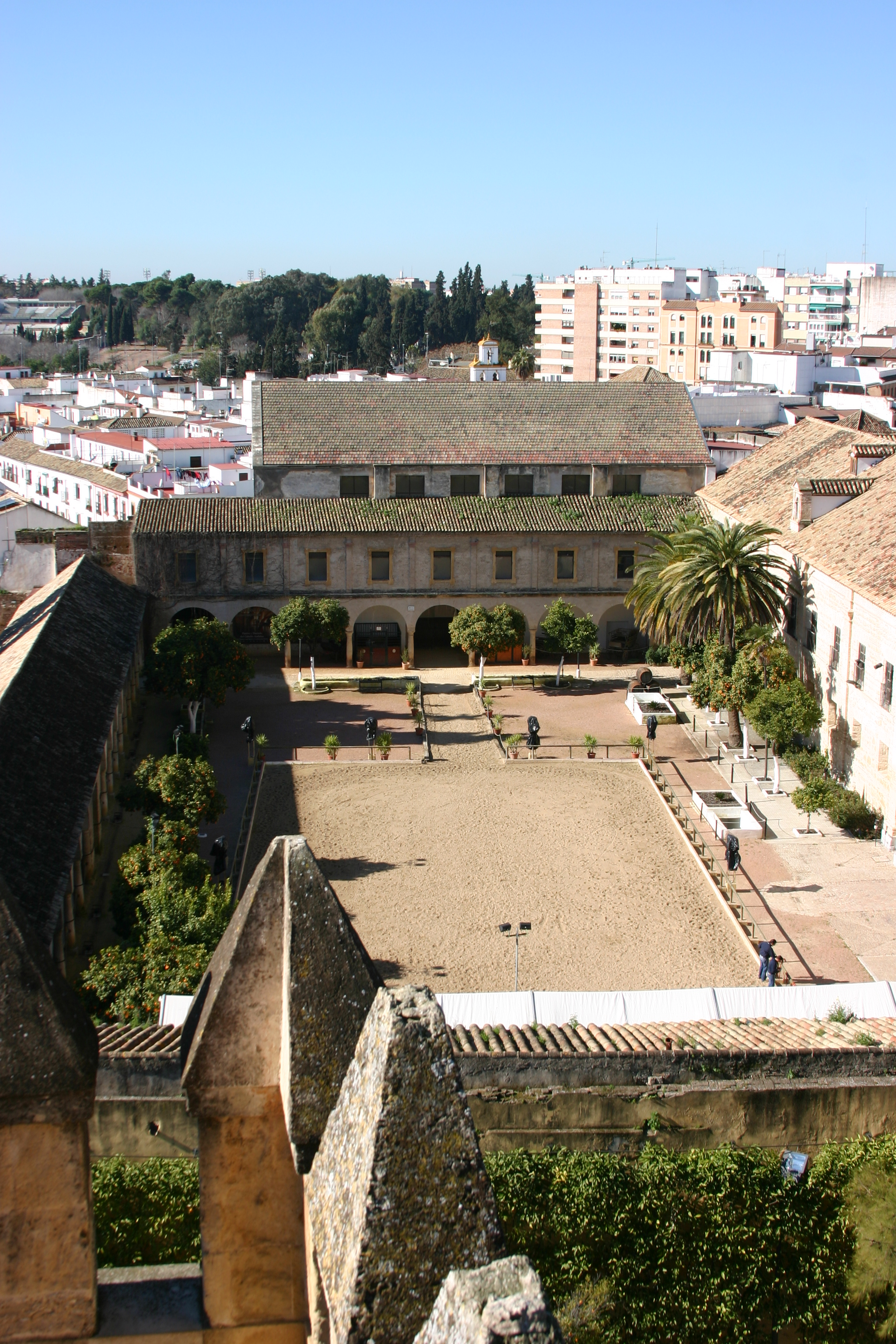
Royal Stables

Royal Stables ((in Spanish) Caballerizas Reales) are a set of stables in Córdoba, Spain. The building is situated in the historic centre and borders the Guadalquivir. The stables housed the best stallions and mares of the royal stud breed Andalusian horse.

== History ==
By royal decree of Felipe II on November 28, 1567, the Spanish Horse breed with formalized standards was created, and a royal stable was established in Córdoba. The king commissioned Diego López de Haro y Sotomayor, 1st Marquis of El Carpio to build the stables on part of the site of the Alcázar fortress. The brand contained an "R" for Real ("royal") inside a C for Córdoba with a corona (crown) on top of the C; the royal stamp was placed on horses produced in the Royal Stables, being the "first brand used on the first horses of the now organized breed".

== Architecture and fittings ==
The building design is characterized by a distinct military style in keeping with its location by the Alcázar fortress. The main area features a cross-vaulted roof which is supported on sandstone columns and is divided into small stables. The building features a permanent equestrian display.
