= Garrucha =

Garrucha, Spain
- municipality
- Flag Coat of arms
- Motto: Ex Mari Orta (Born of The sea)
- Location within Province of Almería Location within Andalusia Location within Spain
- Coordinates: 37°11′03″N 1°49′17″W
- Country: Spain
- Community: Andalusia
- Municipality: Almería

Government
  - Mayor: [María Antonia López Cervantes] (PSOE)

Area
  - Total: 8 km^{2} (3.1 sq mi)
- Elevation: 24 m (79 ft)

Population (2025-01-01)
  - Total: 10,845
  - Density: 1,400/km^{2} (3,500/sq mi)
- Time zone: UTC+1 (CET)
  - Summer (DST): UTC+2 (CEST)
- Climate: BWh

Garrucha is a municipality of Almería province, in the autonomous community of Andalusia, Spain. Garrucha is a seaport of south-eastern Spain on the Mediterranean Sea and the right bank of the river Antas. In 1998 the town had a population of 5000. The harbor of Garrucha, which is defended by an eighteenth-century castle, affords shelter to large ships, and is the natural outlet for the commerce of a once thriving agricultural and mining district. Garrucha had, at the beginning of the twentieth century a considerable trade in lead, silver, copper, iron, esparto grass and fruit, but now the only export from its harbour is gypsum mined in Sorbas, with a million metric tonnes being exported annually. Besides cargo ships, the port is home to a small fishing fleet and has approximately 300 moorings for leisure boats.

== Demographics ==
Historical population
Year	Pop.	±%
1999	5,156	—
2000	5,292	+2.6%
2001	5,465	+3.3%
2002	5,828	+6.6%
2003	6,123	+5.1%
2004	6,525	+6.6%
2005	7,037	+7.8%
2006	7,398	+5.1%
2007	7,920	+7.1%
2008	8,491	+7.2%
2009	8,626	+1.6%
2010	8,441	−2.1%
2011	8,626	+2.2%
2012	8,748	+1.4%
2013	8,663	−1.0%
2014	8,632	−0.4%
2015	8,577	−0.6%
2016	8,655	+0.9%
2017	8,666	+0.1%
2018	8,838	+2.0%
2020	9,520	+7.7%
Source: INE (Spain)

== Climate ==
Garrucha has a hot desert climate (Köppen: BWh) with mild winters, hot summers and very low annual precipitation. Temperatures rarely drop below 5 °C (41 °F) or exceed 35 °C (95 °F) due to the strong mediterranean influences that makes temperatures more pleasant throughout the year. Garrucha never recorded any temperature below freezing (below 0 °C (32 °F)) since records began. It is one of the driest regions in Europe.

Climate data for Garrucha Port (2010–2025), extremes (2009-present)
Month	Jan	Feb	Mar	Apr	May	Jun	Jul	Aug	Sep	Oct	Nov	Dec	Year
Record high °C (°F)	25.3 (77.5)	26.8 (80.2)	27.7 (81.9)	30.9 (87.6)	33.4 (92.1)	41.1 (106.0)	42.6 (108.7)	42.4 (108.3)	35.2 (95.4)	31.5 (88.7)	28.6 (83.5)	26.3 (79.3)	42.6 (108.7)
Mean daily maximum °C (°F)	16.7 (62.1)	17.2 (63.0)	18.3 (64.9)	20.3 (68.5)	23.2 (73.8)	26.7 (80.1)	29.3 (84.7)	29.9 (85.8)	27.6 (81.7)	24.8 (76.6)	20.2 (68.4)	17.7 (63.9)	22.7 (72.8)
Daily mean °C (°F)	12.8 (55.0)	13.4 (56.1)	14.7 (58.5)	16.9 (62.4)	19.6 (67.3)	23.2 (73.8)	26.2 (79.2)	26.7 (80.1)	24.3 (75.7)	21.0 (69.8)	16.4 (61.5)	13.7 (56.7)	19.1 (66.3)
Mean daily minimum °C (°F)	8.8 (47.8)	9.6 (49.3)	11.1 (52.0)	13.4 (56.1)	16.0 (60.8)	19.7 (67.5)	23.0 (73.4)	23.5 (74.3)	20.9 (69.6)	17.3 (63.1)	12.6 (54.7)	9.7 (49.5)	15.5 (59.8)
Record low °C (°F)	1.9 (35.4)	1.6 (34.9)	3.7 (38.7)	6.8 (44.2)	8.6 (47.5)	13.4 (56.1)	17.8 (64.0)	18.4 (65.1)	15.6 (60.1)	10.1 (50.2)	4.1 (39.4)	1.6 (34.9)	1.6 (34.9)
Average precipitation mm (inches)	27.5 (1.08)	6.2 (0.24)	40.0 (1.57)	15.4 (0.61)	12.7 (0.50)	4.6 (0.18)	1.0 (0.04)	12.8 (0.50)	30.3 (1.19)	16.6 (0.65)	34.8 (1.37)	22.7 (0.89)	224.6 (8.82)
Source: Agencia Estatal de Meteorologia

== Sport ==
Garrucha's local football team P.D. Garrucha (Pena Deportivo Garrucha) play in a provincial league within the province of Almeria. The club currently play at the Emilio Moldenhauer ground at the edge of the town. The town has a few other sporting facilities in the area including a harbour side basketball court and a five-a-side football court with two volleyball courts on the town's beaches. A new Gymnasium was completed at the beginning of 2015.

== Tourism ==
The town is visited by tourists from Spain and also the continent. There are many seafront bars and restaurants serving locally produced goods like fish and the produce from farms in the surrounding area.

== See also ==
- List of municipalities in Almería
- Bédar to Garrucha Railway
