= Los Gallardos =

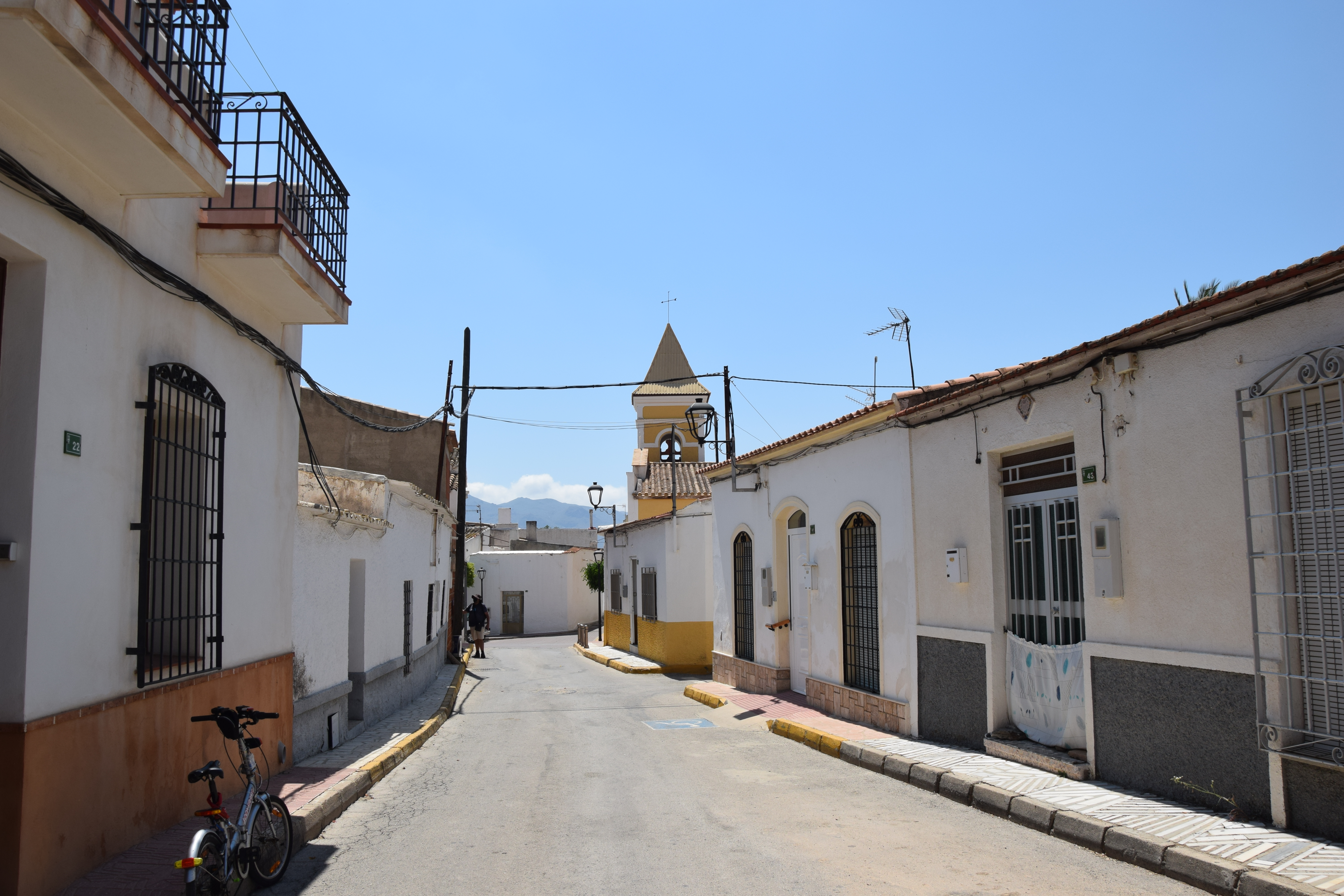

- Flag Coat of arms

- Location within Spain
- Coordinates: 37°10′2″N 1°56′22″W
- Country: Spain
- Community: Andalusia
- Municipality: Almería

Government
  - Mayor: Francisco Reyes

Area
  - Total: 35 km^{2} (14 sq mi)
- Elevation: 132 m (433 ft)

Population (2023)
  - Total: 3,034
  - Density: 87/km^{2} (220/sq mi)
- Time zone: UTC+1 (CET)
  - Summer (DST): UTC+2 (CEST)

Los Gallardos (Spanish pronunciation: [los ɣaˈʎaɾðos]) is a Spanish municipality of the province of Almería, in the autonomous community of Andalusia.

== Demographics ==
Historical population
Year	Pop.	±%
1999	1,700	—
2000	1,798	+5.8%
2001	1,897	+5.5%
2002	2,067	+9.0%
2003	2,252	+9.0%
2004	2,583	+14.7%
2005	2,887	+11.8%
2006	3,126	+8.3%
2007	3,429	+9.7%
2008	3,689	+7.6%
2009	3,752	+1.7%
2010	3,828	+2.0%
2011	3,818	−0.3%
2012	3,831	+0.3%
2013	2,848	−25.7%
2014	3,126	+9.8%
2015	2,973	−4.9%
2016	2,867	−3.6%
2017	2,841	−0.9%
2018	2,803	−1.3%
2019	2,794	−0.3%
2020	2,902	+3.9%
2021	3,003	+3.5%
2022	2,991	−0.4%
2023	3,034	+1.4%
2024	3,071	+1.2%
2025	3,110	+1.3%
Source: INE (Spain)

== Wildfire ==
In July 2026 wildfire affected the area around Los Gallardos. The Spanish authorities at the time struggled to contain the fire. This was described as one of Spain's worst-ever wildfires, with hundreds of firefighter working to extinguish remaining hotspots around the village of Bédar in Almería.

== See also ==
- List of municipalities in Almería
