= Bédar =

- Municipality
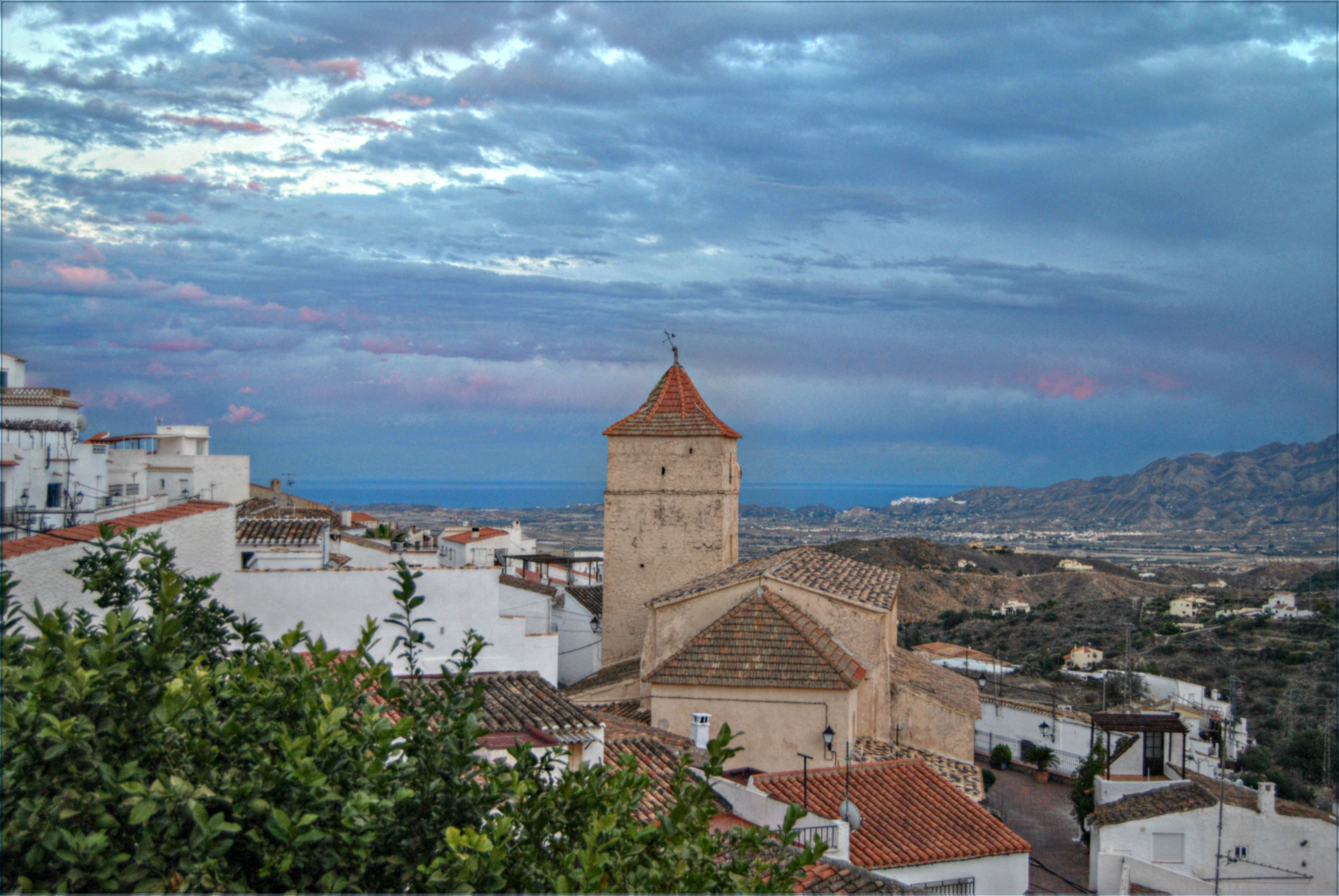

- Seal

- Location within Spain Location within Andalusia Location within Province of Almería
- Coordinates: 37°11′23.2″N 1°59′03.6″W
- Country: Spain
- A. community: Andalucía
- Province: Almería

Government
  - Mayor: Ángel Collado

Area
  - Total: 46.72 km^{2} (18.04 sq mi)

Population (January 1, 2021)
  - Total: 977
  - Density: 20.91/km^{2} (54.2/sq mi)
- Time zone: UTC+01:00
- Postal code: 04288
- MCN: 04022
- Website: Official website

Bédar is a municipality of Almería province, in the autonomous community of Andalusia, Spain. It was a Moorish settlement and then a parish it developed in an area of iron mining and grew to 1,000 residents in recent years. In 2026, Bédar experienced a significant wildfire.

== Demographics ==
Historical population
Year	Pop.	±%
1999	566	—
2000	572	+1.1%
2001	597	+4.4%
2002	632	+5.9%
2003	668	+5.7%
2004	732	+9.6%
2005	777	+6.1%
2006	824	+6.0%
2007	910	+10.4%
2008	976	+7.3%
2009	1,014	+3.9%
2010	1,039	+2.5%
2011	1,061	+2.1%
2012	1,083	+2.1%
2013	1,113	+2.8%
2014	986	−11.4%
2015	990	+0.4%
2016	885	−10.6%
2017	892	+0.8%
2018	927	+3.9%
2019	971	+4.7%
2020	984	+1.3%
2021	974	−1.0%
2022	1,009	+3.6%
2023	1,012	+0.3%
Source: INE (Spain)

== History and heritage ==
The history of Bédar can be traced to the early 16th century, when it was a Moorish settlement in the land of Vera. The parish of Bédar was formed in 1505 after the ‘Reconquista’, and began to use the old mosque as a centre for Christian worship, until construction of the current church. After repopulation of Bédar at the end of the 16th century with 27 inhabitants from Mojácar and Vera, the town expanded during the 16th and 17th centuries to a population around 600 inhabitants.

Mining operations in the area, for iron ore and other minerals, developed during the end of the Moorish period from 1525. The greatest expansion began in the 19th century, which marked a period of prosperity, Bédar being the third most important iron-producing area in the province of Almeria. After several breaks, coinciding with the World Wars, the industry finally closed in 1970, leaving an important industrial archaeological legacy.

Products from the mines were transported to Garrucha for onward transport by sea, following the construction of substantial aerial cableways and the Bédar to Garrucha Railway.

== See also ==
- List of municipalities in Almería
