= Lordship of El Carpio =

Spanish title of nobility

Señorio del Carpio Señorio del Carpio (in Spanish)
- 1325–1559
- Flag Coat of arms
- Common languages: Latin, Spanish language
- Religion: Roman Catholic
- Government: Señorio tied to the Spanish crown
- House of Sotomayor House of Haro
  - 1325: García Méndez de Sotomayor
  - 20 January 1559: Philip II of Spain
  - 1558: Diego López de Haro y Sotomayor
- Historical era: Middle Ages – present
  - Established: 1325
  - Disestablished: 1559
| Preceded by | Succeeded by |
| Caliphate of Córdoba | Kingdom of Spain; Marquesado del Carpio |
- Today part of: El Carpio, Andalucía, Province of Córdoba, Spain

The Lordship of El Carpio (Spanish: Señorio del Carpio) was a Spanish title of nobility established in 1325 for García Méndez de Sotomayor.

== History ==
The lands consisting of the Señorio del Carpio were conquered by King Ferdinand III of Castile in 1240 as a part of the larger Reconquista. Part of the lands conquered in Ferdinand III's Alcocer (Al-Qusayr) campaign were granted to one of the families that assisted in the campaign, namely the Meléndez or the House of Méndez de Sotomayor. By 1325, Garcia Méndez de Sotomayor managed to unite the lands granted to his family and built a tower at El Carpio to be used as the center of government for his lands. The tower was completed in 1325 which is also the date associated with the founding of the Señorio del Carpio.

In 1559, the title was upgraded to the Marquesado del Carpio in 1559 by King Philip II of Spain to the relevant holder, Diego Lopez de Haro y Sotomayor on 20 January 1559 in recognition of his services to the crown,

It is unclear whether the first Marques of Caprio was in fact Diego López de Haro y Sotomayor. Some sources record Diego López as the I Marques and others record Diego López' father Luis Méndez de Haro y Sotomayor as the I Marques. What does appear clear is that Luis Méndez was indeed the 9th Señor del Carpio inheriting the title from his parents and that his son Diego López was also the Marques. Whether the title was conferred upon the 9th or 10th Señor del Carpio appears to be the main question. Luis Méndez inherited the Señorio del Carpio from his mother Beatriz Portocarrero Cárdenas in 1528 according to Margarita Cabrera Sánchez. If the date of the upgrade to a Marquesado is accurately put at 1559, it would seem that the first Marques of Carpio was indeed Diego López de Haro y Sotomayor, which is supported by the Real Academia de la Historia.

== Title holders ==
- This list is based on one single source which is contradicted by other sources. As such, it may be incomplete, inaccurate or missing persons.

| | Title | Dates |
Created by Philip II of Spain
| I | García Méndez de Sotomayor | 1325–? |
| II | Garcí Mélendez de Sotomayor | ?–? |
| III | Gomez García de Sotomayor | ?–? |
| IV | Garcí Méndez de Sotomayor | ?–? |
| V | Luis Méndez de Sotomayor | ?–? |
| VI | Garcí Méndez de Sotomayor | ?–? |
| VII | Luis Méndez de Sotomayor | ?–? |
| VIII | Beatriz de Sotomayor | ?–? |
| IX | Luis Méndez de Haro y Sotomayor | ?–? |
| X | Diego López de Haro y Sotomayor | ?–20 January 1559 – Title upgraded to Marquesado del Carpio |

== See also ==
- Marquesado del Carpio
