= Ricohombre =

The ricohombre (a magnate, literally, a Spanish word for "richman") or ricahombría, was a high ranking nobility title in medieval kingdoms on the territories of modern Spain and Portugal, replaced by a title of grandee in the late 14th-early 15th century. The ricoshombres, established during the Reconquista (the first document with the term, the charter of Santarém, Portugal, is dated 1179), were supposed to be advisers to the rulers. The transition from ricoshombres to grandees occurred between 1390 and 1530 as the new "noble oligarchy" replaced the old one due to the change of power base caused by the conflict between infantes of Aragon and the supporters of John II of Castile with his favorite Álvaro de Luna. Alfonso de Cartagena in his Doctrinal de los caballeros (c. 1441–1444), while discussing the grandees, states that the previous term ricohombre is "old-fashioned".

== Castile ==
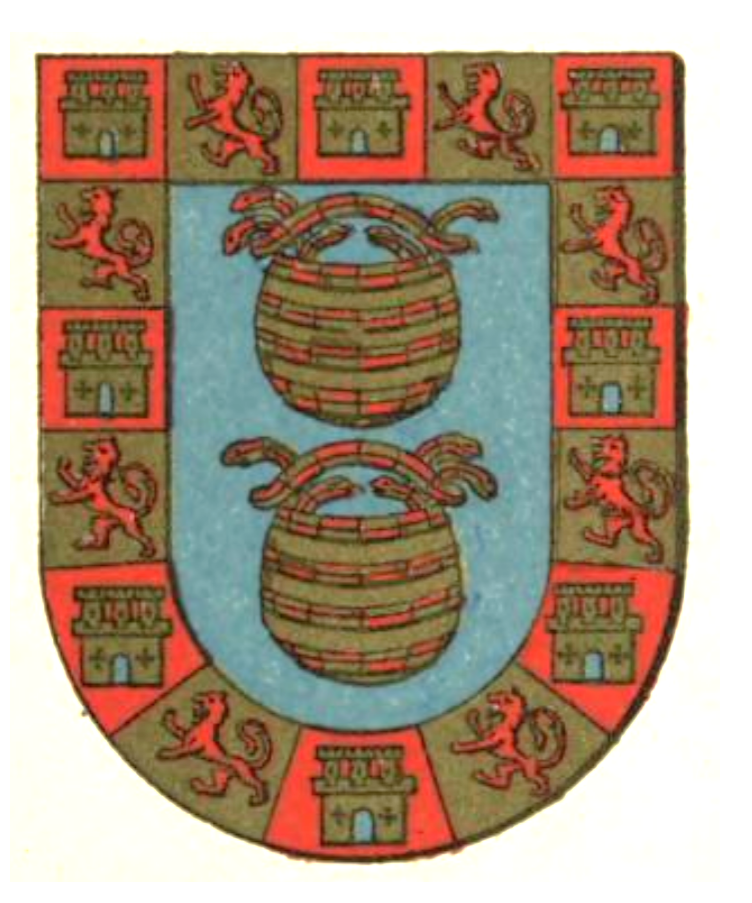
Coat of arms with caldrons (House of Guzmán)

In Castile, the title had appeared in the 12th century and designated the class of nobility at the very top of hierarchy, behind only people of royal blood. The Partidas allowed ricoshombres to keep their hats on in the presence of the king.

The circle of ricoshombres of Castile was exclusive and small, their numbers varied with the changes of fortunes of a sovereign. For example, Alfonso X of Castile early in his reign had 18 ricoshombres of Castille and 14 of Leon. After a rebellion of nobles in 1272-1273, the numbers dropped to 15 and 9 respectively. By 1282 there were just 14 Castilians and 5 Leonese left. Alfonso's son, Sancho IV of Castile, by 1284 managed to double the number of ricohombres to 40 (25 of Castille, 15 of Leon).

Admission was done by the king in a ritual involving a grant of a pennon and a heraldic caldron. Ricoshombres held large tax-free hereditary possessions that can only be taken back by the Crown if the holder became a traitor or died without an heir, with seigniorial and jurisdictional rights. Ricoshombres also occupied senior administrative and advisory positions at the royal court and later served as members of the parliament (Cortes de Castilla).

== Navarre ==
The arms of the King of Navarre and his twelve original lineages of rich nobles

In Navarre, ricohombre is a title given to a small number (originally twelve) of members of the highest nobility in Navarra during the Late Middle Ages, previously known as princes, barons, or lords. In most cases, they were related to the kings. Ricohombre was the highest noble title in the early centuries of Iberian monarchies. From the 12th century, it can be seen that the kings granted the ricohombría to the knights they deemed appropriate and gave them government over one or more towns, assigning them equivalent rents to the number of horses or men that they were to serve the king with in war. José Yanguas y Miranda, in his Dictionary of Antiquities of the Kingdom of Navarra states that it was: "First dignity of the kingdom among the class of nobility. There is no news of this title being used in Navarre until the 12th century".

In 1329, it still appears that the number of ricoshombres was limited to twelve. It is known that in the oath made by King Philip III and Queen Joan II: Juan Corbarán de Leet (Lehet) alférez, Juan Martínez de Medrano 'The Elder', Lord of Sartaguda, Juan Martínez de Medrano 'The Younger', Semen de Aybar (Aibar), Remir Périz de Arróniz, Arnal Guillén, Lord of Agramont, Pedro Sánchiz de Monteagut, Pedro Seméniz de Mirafuentes, Guillén Arnalt lord of Salt, Alfonso Díaz de Morentiain (Morentin), Sancho Sánchiz de Ureta and Pedro Moinez (Moiñoz) attended.

The title ricohombre only includes those who possess the highest nobility, whether by birth (blood) or by privilege (merit). The origin of this title dates back to the times of the Reconquista. The reason they were called ricohombre (rich-men) was due to birth (blood) and secondly, the many vassals in their service and numerous possessions granted to them by the kings based on their privilege (merits) in supporting the sovereign in the conquest or repopulation of new lands. The Ricoshombres de Navarra constituted the most privileged sector of the nobility with a high level of social prestige, economic capacity and political attributions in the Kingdom of Navarre. The ransom for ricoshombres was set at a thousand maravedíes.

The Armorial Book of the Kingdom of Navarre lists the original 12 ricohombres of Navarre. The General Jurisdiction specifies its functions and dedicates several chapters on private law to them. It seems according to the general jurisdiction that at first there were only the twelve rich men or twelve wise men of the earth. It is likely that rich and wise were synonymous:

The rich men were the king's advisors, without their advice he could not have a court or tribunal (...) nor make peace, war or truce with another king or queen, nor another great feat or royal embargo.

However, in the 14th century, the granting of ricohombre titles faced opposition, as they were bestowed by the kings upon newborns. During this period, a significant change was observed in the allocation of estates. The title of ricohombre remained in use until the reign of Juan de Labrit and Catalina. In their swearing-in ceremony, this title was mentioned for several knights. However, it completely disappeared after the union with Castile.

== Sources ==
- "Ricoshombres". Auñamendi Encyclopedia [on line] (in Basque). Fund Bernardo Estornés Lasa.
- Iafolla, Robert John (2021). Conceptions of Power in Late Medieval Castile: From Possession to Exercise (PDF) (PhD in History thesis). University of California, Los Angeles.
- Picón, P.V. (1895). "Ricohombre". Diccionario enciclopedico hispano-americano de literatura, ciencias y artes: Edicion profusamente ilustrada con miles de pequeños grabados intercalados en el texto y tirados aparte, que reproducen las diferentes especies de los reinos animal, vegetal y mineral (in Spanish). Vol. 17. Montaner y Simón.
- Estow, Clara (1995-01-01). "The Nobility and the New Regime". Pedro the Cruel of Castile (1350-1369). BRILL. pp. 20–39. doi:10.1163/9789004478091_007. ISBN 978-90-04-47809-1.
- Rines, G.E. (1909). The United Editors Perpetual Encyclopedia: A Library of Universal Knowledge Combined with an Unabridged Dictionary of the English Language. Vol. 26. United editors association.
- Espasa-Calpe, s. a (1926). "Ricohombre". Enciclopedia vniversal ilvstrada evropeo-americana: etimologías sánscrito, hebreo, griego, látin, árabe, lenguas indígenas americanas, etc.; versiones de la mayorîa de las voces en francés, italiano, inglés, alemán, portugués, catalán, esperanto ... (in Spanish). Espasa-Calpe.
- Hernández, F.J. (2021). Los hombres del rey y la transición de Alfonso X el Sabio a Sancho IV (1276-1286). Obras de Referencia (in Spanish). Ediciones Universidad de Salamanca. ISBN 978-84-1311-563-4.
