= Sorbas =

- Municipality
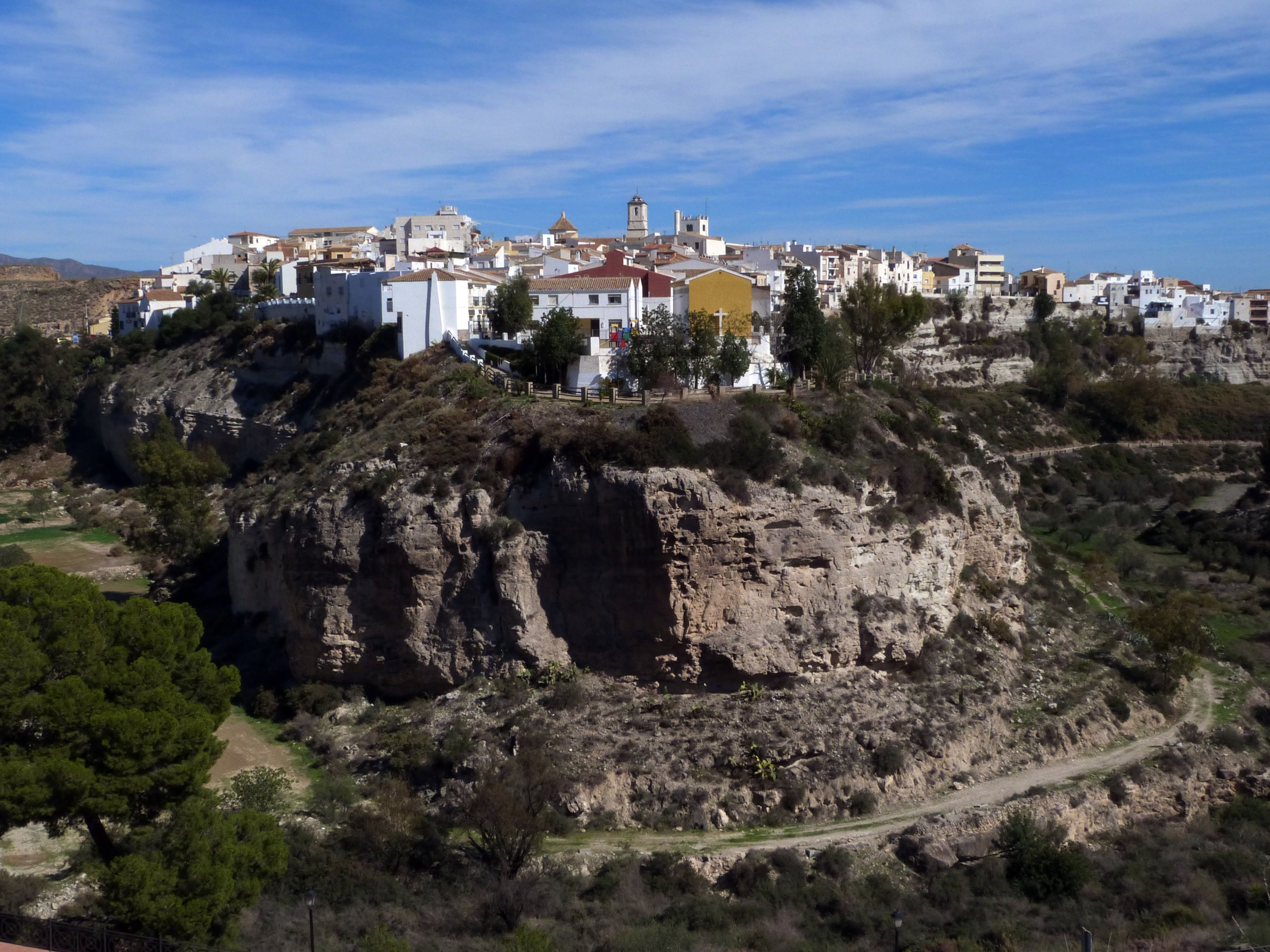
- View of Sorbas

- Coat of arms

- Location within Spain
- Coordinates: 37°05′53″N 2°07′27″W
- Country: Spain
- Community: Andalusia
- Province: Almería
- Comarca: Levante Almeriense

Government
  - Mayor: José Fernández Amador

Area
  - Total: 249.2 km^{2} (96.2 sq mi)

Population (January 1, 2021)
  - Total: 2,459
  - Density: 9.868/km^{2} (25.56/sq mi)
- Time zone: UTC+01:00 (CET)
- Postal code: 04270
- Area code: 04086
- Website: Official website

Sorbas is a municipality of Almería province, in the autonomous community of Andalusia, Spain.

== Demographics ==
Historical population
Year	Pop.	±%
1999	2,735	—
2000	2,693	−1.5%
2001	2,651	−1.6%
2002	2,732	+3.1%
2003	2,749	+0.6%
2004	2,707	−1.5%
2005	2,840	+4.9%
Source: INE (Spain)

== See also ==
- List of municipalities in Almería
