= Lubrín =

Lubrín, Spain
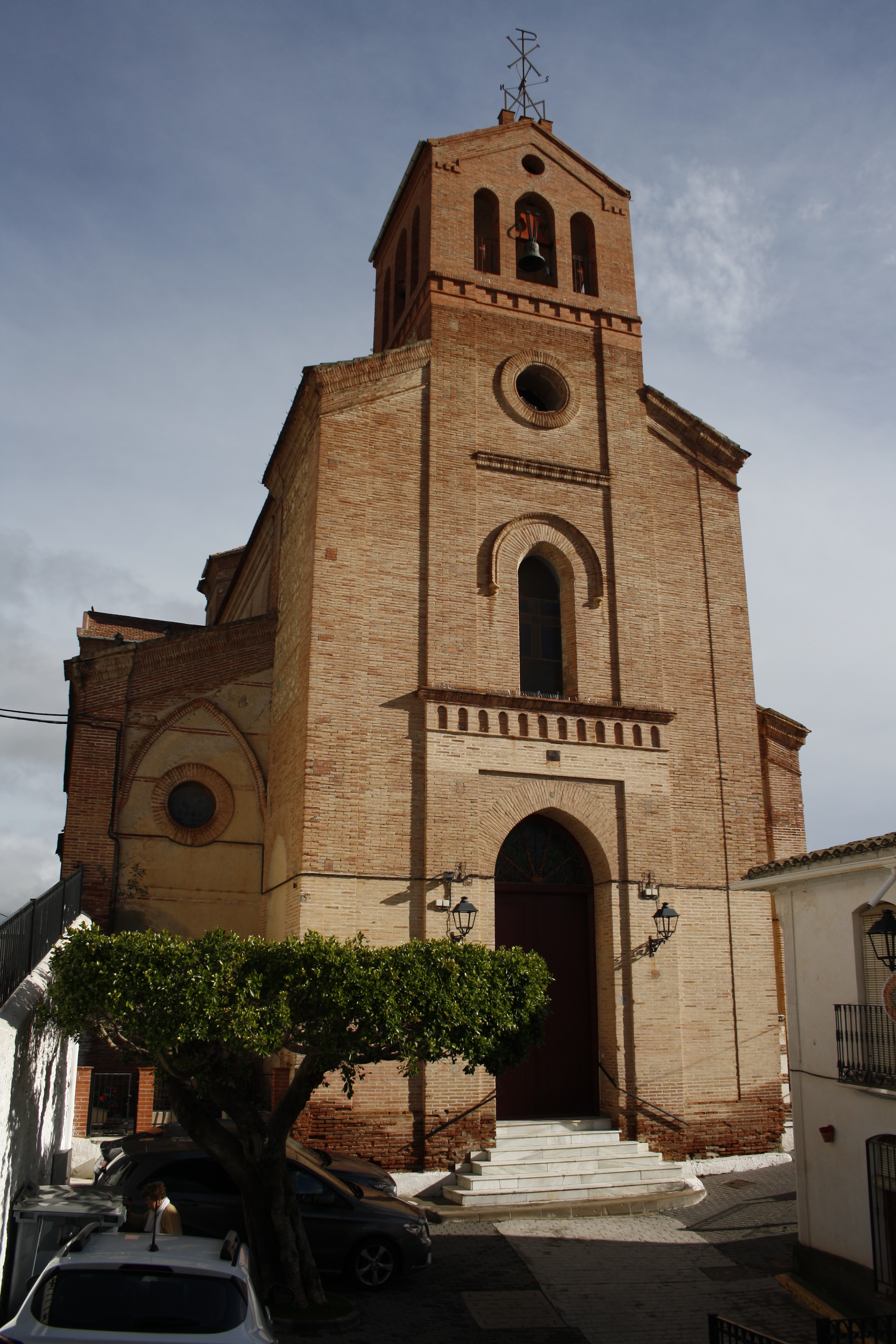

- Flag Coat of arms
- Interactive map of Lubrín, Spain
- Coordinates: 37°13′N 2°04′W
- Country: Spain
- Community: Andalusia
- Municipality: Almería

Government
  - Mayor: Domingo Jose Ramos Camacho (PSOE)

Area
  - Total: 138 km^{2} (53 sq mi)
- Elevation: 510 m (1,670 ft)

Population (2025-01-01)
  - Total: 1,434
  - Density: 10.4/km^{2} (26.9/sq mi)
- Time zone: UTC+1 (CET)
  - Summer (DST): UTC+2 (CEST)

Lubrín is a municipality of Almería province, in the autonomous community of Andalusia, Spain. It is located in the eastern foothills of the Sierra de los Filabres. The main settlements in the municipality are Lubrín, La Rambla Aljibe, El Marchal de Lubrín, El Pilar de Lubrín, El Chive, El Pocico, La Alcarria de Lubrín and El Saetí.

== Demographics ==
Historical population
Year	Pop.	±%
1999	1,771	—
2000	1,707	−3.6%
2001	1,673	−2.0%
2002	1,635	−2.3%
2003	1,636	+0.1%
2004	1,667	+1.9%
2005	1,670	+0.2%
2017	1,440	−13.8%
Source: INE (Spain)

== See also ==
- List of municipalities in Almería
