= Destiny (Queen of Swords) =

- Queen of Swords episode
- Tessa and Marta discover the hidden gold revealed in Tessa's dream and the Alvarado family sword.
- Episode no.: Season 1 Episode 1
- Directed by: Jon Cassar
- Written by: James Thorpe
- Cinematography by: Alwyn Kumst
- Production code: 101
- Original air date: October 7, 2000
- Running time: 44 minutes

Guest appearance
- Jose Sancho as Don Rafael Alvarado

Episode chronology
← Previous —	Next → "Death to the Queen"

"Destiny" is the first episode and origin story of the syndicated television series Queen of Swords, airing October 7, 2000.

Tessa Alvarado returns to Spanish California on the death of her father to find her home in ruins and the area under the control of a tyrant, Colonel Montoya. From a dream about her dead father and his 'Avenging Angel', Tessa becomes the Queen of Swords.

== Credited cast ==
Cast as listed at the beginning and end of episode.

- Tessie Santiago as Tessa Alvarado/The Queen
- Anthony Lemke as Captain Marcus Grisham
- Elsa Pataky as Vera Hidalgo
- Peter Wingfield as Dr. Robert Helm (does not appear in this episode)
- Paulina Galvez as Marta the gypsy
- Valentine Pelka as Colonel Luis Ramirez Montoya
- Jose Sancho as Don Rafael Alvarado
- Tacho Gonzales as Don Gaspar Hidalgo
- Teresa del Olmo as Rubina
- Enrique Rodriguez as Fernando
- Anthony De Longis as Maestro Juan Torres
- Antonio Mayans as Carlos
- Jaimie Palmer Colom as Corporal Leandro
- Gabriel Garcia as a shopkeeper
- Santos Villodres as a shopkeeper

== Plot ==
In Madrid and during 1817, Tessa Alvarado is having fencing lessons, that her father might not approve of, from Maestro Torres when her servant Marta the gypsy, who has looked after her since she was sent to Madrid at the age of seven to complete her education, arrives with a letter. Expecting it to announce her father's arrival, Tessa is shocked to find it contains news of his death after a fall from a horse. Unbeknown to Tessa her father had been chased by soldiers, wounded and finally killed by a rifle shot by Captain Grisham. Tessa decides it is time to go home to California.

Arriving by ship, Tessa, Marta, and their luggage are being transported by carriage and wagon inland to the Alvarado Hacienda. When they stop to assist a broken-down wagon, they are set upon at gunpoint by masked robbers. Tessa recognizes the voice of the main robber as her father's manservant, Carlos, and when she confronts him, he takes off his mask, confessing his family is starving. Tessa, seeing his desperation, gives him some money. A shot rings out and Carlos is wounded in the arm as Captain Grisham and his men ride up. Grisham introduces himself and returns the money to Tessa, offering to escort her and Marta to the Alvarado Hacienda while his men take Carlos to town.

When they arrive at the Hacienda, they find it is in disrepair, and Captain Grisham points out that when her father died, there was no money to pay the workers and that back taxes are owed to Colonel Montoya, but the colonel would loan her the house for a few days and they are invited to a party the colonel is holding that evening.

Tessa and Marta go to Santa Helena and find Carlos in the town square tied to a post while his wife, Rubina, tries forlornly to give him some water, but a soldier is preventing this until Tessa intervenes. She promises to speak to Colonel Montoya about her husband. Entering the rose garden, Tessa and Marta find Montoya entertaining the Dons and their wives by playing the violin. Don Hidalgo is present with his young wife and recognizes Tessa but before they can speak Montoya interrupts and asks Tessa to dance. Seeing an opportunity to plead Carlos's case, but to no avail, and as a group of Flamenco dancers begin their routine, Tessa hears a commotion in the square and goes outside to find Carlos is about to be shot by a firing squad headed by Captain Grisham. At the climax to the dance, Carlos is killed. Tessa learns that execution is not murder when it is the law and Montoya is the law.

Later that night and back at her hacienda, an angry Tessa is shadow fencing determined to send a message back to Spain, but Marta points out that Spain is still recovering from the wounds of Napoleon and would not be interested. Marta has also learned that Tessa's father had been murdered. At the same time, Colonel Montoya visits Captain Grisham, who is in bed with unfaithful Vera, his lover. Montoya, concerned about Tessa, wants to ensure control of her land by having Grisham propose marriage. Grisham cannot refuse as Montoya can blackmail him with information about his past.

The next morning. Tessa visits Rubina and her teenage son, who holds Tessa responsible for his father's death much to Rubina's disgust. Rubina refuses to answer questions about Tessa's father but when given some money for the children, she tells Tessa to ask the Dons. Visiting Don Hidalgo, he is not forthcoming and advises her patronizingly to go home, find a husband, and find fulfillment in marriage. Interrupted by one of Grisham's soldiers with an invitation to lunch at a beach with Grisham. At the beach Grisham, talks about marriage. But Tessa only wants to talk about her father's murder yet he insists it was an accident. Tessa asks Grisham to take her back to town. As they arrive back in town, Rubina's son has been arrested, accused of theft by a shopkeeper. But Tessa said she gave the family some money. The boy spits at Captain Grisham, who is incensed. But Tessa asks for mercy and Grisham agrees that the boy will not be executed, but given 50 lashes the next morning.

That night, while Tessa sleeps Marta reads some tarot cards, which mirror a dream that Tessa is having about her father, who speaks to her about his wine (referring to it as liquid gold) and his murder. But she should do nothing because his "avenging angel" will see justice done. Waking, she goes to Marta, who already knows what has happened. Going to their cellar, they find the wine in the dream and the bottle in the rack is a handle to a secret door into a concealed room. Within, they find Don Alvarado's hidden valuables including gold and a sword, a rapier in the family for generations, for the son he never had. There is also a portrait of Tessa as a seven-year-old titled "Tessa my Angel." Looking in a mirror with the tarot card of the Queen of Swords, Marta asks what she sees, and Tessa replies ”My destiny!”

Further into the night, Tessa dressed as the Queen of Swords goes to the jail in Santa Helena and, by surprise, overpowers two guards and frees the boy. Her own exit is obstructed by Grisham standing in the doorway with his sword, prepared to kill, and she would be the first woman he has killed. A sword fight ensues with much toing and froing and the Queen retreats into the narrow cell corridor where she is at a disadvantage against a stronger opponent. Grisham gets in close forcing the Queen against the bars believing he has the upper hand but the Queen has maneuvered her sword between his legs. Gaining the advantage, the Queen escapes leaving a calling card from the tarot, the Queen of Swords.

Pleased, Tessa goes into town in the morning to find Don Hidago and Montoya discussing the night's events and Hidalgo points out how clever the Colonel is, as the boy went home to his mother and the colonel had men waiting for him and now he will be hung. In Montoya's office, he is surprised when Tessa pays her back taxes but offers her a front row seat at the hanging. But as she leaves his office, she meets Marta and pretends illness so they can be left alone in his office. As the boy is led to the scaffold, Montoya makes a speech from the balcony to the townsfolk when the Queen appears on the church roof and in the ensuing mayhem, to the cheers of the townsfolk, frees the boy once more, then takes him out into the desert warning him not to go home. A furious and thwarted Montoya returns to his office to find Marta tending to a feigning Tessa lying under a cover, and asks her impatiently to get dressed and leave.

Tessa goes to her father's grave asking him for guidance when Marta tells her the people are praying for the Queen to return. Tessa realizes that this is her destiny, with her father's voice in her mind telling her she would never be alone.

== Production notes ==
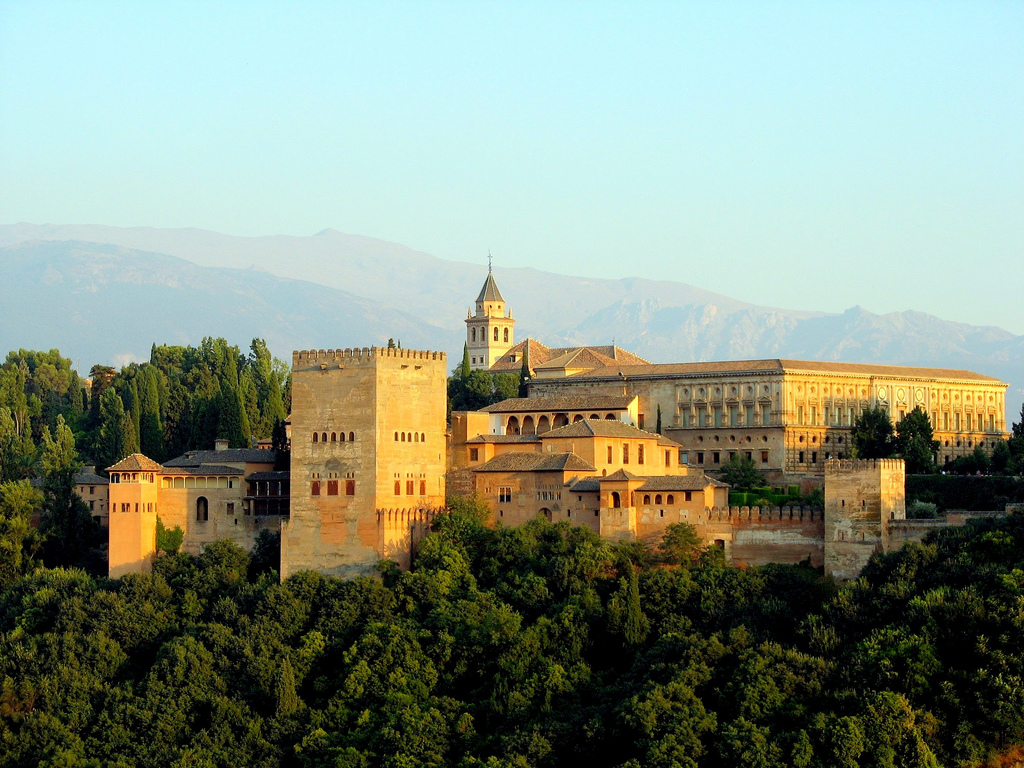
The Alhambra, Granada, was used to represent Madrid in 1817 in the episode's opening

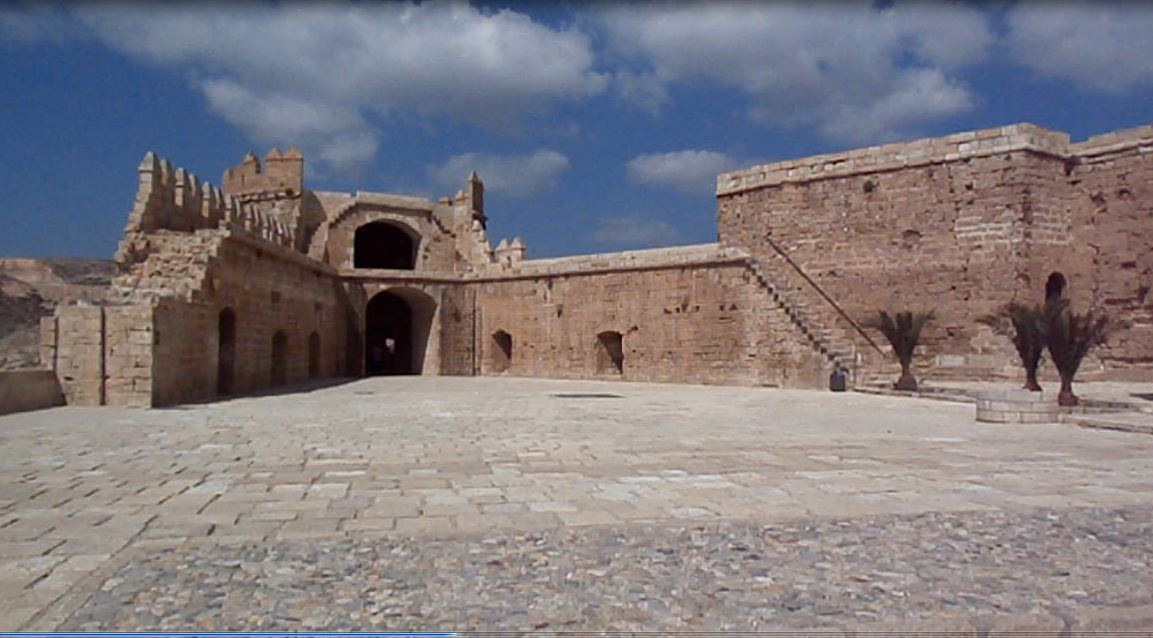
The courtyard of the Alcazaba of Almeria was dressed for the Madrid training sequence

- "Destiny" was the third episode to be filmed as the producers wanted any problems sorted out during filming of "Death to the Queen" and "Vengeance" and give the cast experience of their roles.
- This episode filmed principally at Texas Hollywood, Almeria, and the surrounding Tabernas Desert with coastal locations at San Jose near the city of Almeria.
- The Alcazaba of Almeria courtyard was used for the Madrid training sequence and the garden as Don Hidalgo's hacienda garden.
- The exterior of the Alhambra, Granada was used to represent Madrid in the opening seconds.
- Swordmaster Anthony de Longis wanted a unique fighting style for the Queen of Swords and used the Spanish Destreza mysterious circle fencing style with the Rapier he favored.
- Production designer Fernando Gonzalez had to make a platform to cover an ugly metal grating in the courtyard at The Alcazaba of Almeria to an otherwise perfect location. De Longis had studied the Spanish training system, the "Mysterious Circle," and had diagrams and dimensions for construction of the "Circle". The platform would make a smooth surface for the actors to fight and play the scene on. Gonzalez borrowed his notes and two days later in his workshop displayed the twin interlocking panels with the painted circles and lines that his artists had created.
- The Queen's sword, a Rapier in the "family for generations", discovered in the room behind the wine rack and used for the rest of the series was made by blade maker Dave Baker who also created distinctive durable swords for the show.
