= Duel with a Stranger =

- Queen of Swords episode
- Antonio unmasks the Queen of Swords
- Episode no.: Season 1 Episode 6
- Directed by: Richard Martin
- Written by: Elizabeth Keyishian
- Cinematography by: Alwyn Kumst
- Production code: 106
- Original air date: November 11, 2000
- Running time: 44 minutes

Guest appearances
- Cristián de la Fuente as Antonio; Tacho Gonzalez as Don Gasper Hidalgo

Episode chronology
← Previous "The Witness"	Next → "Running Wild"

"Duel with a Stranger" is the sixth episode of the syndicated television series Queen of Swords, airing November 11, 2000.

Colonel Montoya employs a professional swordsman to kill The Queen after seeing him humiliate Captain Grisham in a test of his prowess. The swordsman from Madrid is Antonio, Tessa's old sweetheart.

== Credited cast ==
Cast as listed at the beginning and end of episode.

- Tessie Santiago as Tessa Alvarado/The Queen
- Anthony Lemke as Captain Marcus Grisham
- Elsa Pataky as Vera Hidalgo
- Peter Wingfield as Dr. Robert Helm (does not appear in this episode)
- Paulina Galvez as Marta the gipsy
- Valentine Pelka as Colonel Luis Ramirez Montoya
- Cristián de la Fuente as Antonio
- Tacho Gonzalez as Don Gaspar Hidalgo
- Eduardo Recabarren as Pietro
- Olivier Vitran as the young man

== Plot ==
Outside town Colonel Montoya, Captain Grisham, and some soldiers are assembled to meet a young Spanish nobleman, Antonio. The purpose is to test his claims as the finest swordsman in Spain. Skilled in the Spanish Destreza mysterious circle fencing system he takes on first Captain Grisham and quickly disarms him. Montoya orders his men to attack and Antonio swiftly renders them senseless. Captain Grisham is encouraged by Montoya to try again, but to no avail, much to Montoya's amusement of Grisham's humiliation. Montoya agrees to pay Antonio to kill the Queen although his offer to pay a deposit offends Antonio's honor as he is not a 'tradesman'.

At the Alvarado hacienda Tessa is taking a bath in preparation for a party at Montoya's and is reminiscing with Marta about the parties she attended back in Madrid. Marta points out she is going to find about gold shipments Montoya is making. At the party, eternally-cuckolded Don Hidalgo is calling for his wife Vera who is nowhere to be found. Canoodling with Captain Grisham until she hears her husband's voice. Tessa and Marta are mingling when Tessa spies Antonio across the room talking to Montoya, bringing back a flood of memories of two years earlier when they were sweethearts in Madrid when she and Marta witnessed Antonio dueling and called out to save his life when his beaten opponent tried to kill him from behind. Marta is not pleased that Antonio regards honor above all else, but Tessa defends him and later that day, when he is going off to fight Napoleon, is ready to give up her virginity, but he stops her as a matter of honor. She gave him her Saint Christopher pendant to keep him safe. Now he is here in Santa Helena on business and will be a rich man and wants to meet her again. Montoya and Grisham, watching with surprise that Antonio and Tessa know each other set a plan in motion using a drunken coach driver, trying in vain to impress Marta, boasting of taking gold in the coach tomorrow at dawn. Marta informs Tessa on the journey back home, but she is happy with seeing Antonio, much to Marta's annoyance.

Dawn, and the coach escorted by two outriders is pursued by the Queen and the two outriders are soon eliminated. Riding Chico hard, the Queen catches the coach and transfers from horse to coach and makes the driver jump, eventually bringing the coach under control. She brings it to a halt and her horse Chico follows alongside. From inside the coach Antonio emerges to greet a shocked Queen. Refusing to stand and fight she jumps from the coach to her horse and escapes.

Montoya has to resort to another plan. Marta hears the events from the coach driver, then spies Tessa going to the church to meet Antonio, and berates her to be careful. In the church Antonio explains that the war ruined his family and the money for killing the Queen would enable him to return to Spain and take her with him to be married. Vera overhears and reports to Captain Grisham who is in the bath and the conversation turns to Grisham's believing he could beat Antonio and his flashy Spanish circles, but Vera is concerned for Grisham whose contempt for Antonio is not dulled. That evening Tessa and Marta have a heart to heart and Marta's reading of the tarot does not solve anything, so Tessa rides out as the Queen to Antonio's hotel room. Explaining she is not a bandit but only wants justice means nothing to Antonio and he draws his sword and after a short engagement disarms the Queen and as he steps forward to kill the Queen she throws an oil lamp to the ground giving her the time to escape through the window. Antonio rushes to the square and takes a horse followed by Captain Grisham. Daylight and the pursuit comes to a halt when Grisham contemptuously leaves Antonio in his futile chase and returns to Santa Helena. Montoya visits the Alvarado hacienda and intimates to Marta that she and Tessa return to Spain. Montoya returns to Santa Helena and informs Grisham that when Antonio kills the Queen he can kill Antonio so the reward does not have to be paid. This is music to Grisham's ears.

The Queen is still riding when Antonio jumps out pistol in hand demanding she stands and fights. Dismounting, the Queen draws her rapier and dagger to face Antonio similarly armed. She tilts her head back, her long hair flowing, and they take up the same stance and clash swords and daggers. Antonio recognizes her style as having been taught by Maestro Torres. He is shocked when she calls his name and they clash again and Antonio loses his dagger and the Queen retreats to be confronted again by Antonio more determined than ever, and as he forces her against a wall and with his free hand removes her mask, he gasps upon discovering it is Tessa Alvarado. He leaves and returns to Santa Helena and Montoya's office and finds Captain Grisham and demands the gold, throwing down the Queen's mask. Grisham refuses without proof and Antonio knocks him out and takes the gold, killing a guard on his exit.

Back at the Alvarado hacienda Marta cannot convince Tessa that Antonio will betray her. Antonio appears and asks Tessa to come away with him and the gold. She refuses and realising the gold is Montoya's, takes a pistol in her shaking hand, and tells him to leave it, but he turns his back and walks out followed by Tessa and Marta just as Colonel Montoya and his men arrive. Montoya wants to know who the Queen of Swords is and Antonio admits he can tell who she is as he gets on his horse. Marta encourages Tessa to shoot him, but with her hand still shaking cannot believe he will betray her. Montoya goads him about his honor and an incensed Antonio throws the gold down and takes his sword and charges Montoya. Grisham appears from behind a wagon and shoots Antonio from his horse. Tessa runs to Antonio to comfort him as he lay dying with Montoya demanding to know who the Queen is.

The next day in Santa Helena Colonel Montoya berates Captain Grisham for killing Antonio for his own jealous reasons but he denies it not to Montoya's satisfaction. In the church Tessa is grieving for Antonio and Montoya approaches her to find out if Antonio had confessed the identity of the Queen. She denied he had and Montoya reminds her if not for the Queen she would be on her way home to a new life in Spain with Antonio.

== Production notes ==
Swordmaster and stunt co-ordinator, Anthony De Longis doubled for Cristián de la Fuente in the sword fights with Anthony Lemke and Tessie Santiago.

The final sword fight was shot one phrase at a time. The master shot filmed by De Longis and Gaelle Cohen (Santiago's sword double) and then repeat the action with de la Fuente and Santiago. Then Cohen doubled for de la Fuente's coverage and De Longis did the same for Santiago. De Longis said "Tessie remembered her days of training and the work from "Destiny" and she performed with grace and fire. We fought our way up the hill until the Queen is finally cornered".
