= Fever (Queen of Swords) =

- Queen of Swords episode
- Dr Helm shows Colonel Montoya the bomb's fuse plug
- Episode no.: Season 1 Episode 3
- Directed by: Paolo Barzman
- Written by: Scott Kraft
- Cinematography by: Alwyn Kumst
- Production code: 105
- Original air date: October 21, 2000
- Running time: 44 minutes

Episode chronology
← Previous "Death to the Queen"	Next → "Vengeance"

"Fever" is the third episode of the syndicated television series Queen of Swords, airing October 21, 2000.

Fever sweeps Santa Helena. Marta and Colonel Montoya fall victim and Captain Grisham takes the opportunity to let Montoya die when he acquires Dr Helm's medicine. Dr Helm realises The Queen is not as bad as she is painted.

== Credited cast ==
Cast as listed at the beginning and end of episode.

- Tessie Santiago as Tessa Alvarado/The Queen
- Anthony Lemke as Captain Marcus Grisham
- Elsa Pataky as Vera Hidalgo
- Peter Wingfield as Dr. Robert Helm
- Paulina Galvez as Marta the gipsy
- Valentine Pelka as Colonel Luis Ramirez Montoya
- Jesus Temino as Enrique
- Irene Gonzalez as Pira
- Jesus Herrera Jaimez as the guard
- Jose Fernandez as the farmer
- Enrique Santiago Fernandez as the shopkeeper

== Plot ==
Fever is sweeping Santa Helena and the surrounding area. One of the peasant farmers, Enrique, is tending his sick wife when Captain Grisham and his men arrive at his front door and forcibly conscript him to Colonel Montoya's depleted army. Taken to Santa Helena, Enrique is brutally treated by Captain Grisham's training regime. Tessa Alvarado, witnessing the violence, pleads for Enrique to be released but Grisham's amorous conditions is of course not acceptable. Colonel Montoya is not feeling well and is furious to learn Dr Helm has used all his medicine treating others, but is promised by the evening he will have manufactured some more. This conversation is overheard by Enrique sweeping the hall outside Montoya's office. Marta is visiting Pira but she has no effective medicine and she too is succumbing to the fever.

That evening Montoya is in bed burning with the fever with Grisham in attendance. Opening the window to let in air he watches the doctor cross the square when Helm is attacked and knocked unconscious by Enrique, who then grabs the medicine. The watching Grisham realises Montoya could die without the medicine, and takes out his pistol, fires and deliberately misses Enrique and then calls out the Queen of Swords has attacked the doctor, and taken the medicine. The next morning in the square Tessa and Marta see a wanted poster for the Queen and the townsfolk are turning against her. Marta becomes sicker and Tessa realises she has the fever, and takes her home. Enrique has gone home to his Pira and the medicine he administers begins to cure her. He goes outside, and Captain Grisham is waiting for him demanding the medicine, but Enrique blames the Queen but Grisham knows the truth and beats him until he gets the medicine from its hiding place, but Enrique tries to attack Grisham who shoots him dead in front of his wife. Grisham then threatens the widow to remain silent. Marta is in bed, a reluctant patient, tended by Tessa and they come to the wrong conclusion that Montoya is behind the theft. Later that morning the Queen decides to visit Montoya in his sick bed and she realises Montoya is still ill but with enough strength to fire his pistol and call out the guard leading to the Queen making her escape by fighting a number of soldiers.

Tessa finds Marta out of bed having read the Tarot cards and tells Tessa to ask the dead for the medicine. That afternoon Tessa returns to Santa Helena and is shocked to see the funeral of Enrique, with Pira claiming he died from the fever even though well only the day before. Tessa goes to Dr Helm, who is preparing more medicine, telling him of Marta's plight and he reassures her the fever takes five days to kill. She then decides to go to Grisham's quarters to search for the stolen medicine. Suddenly Grisham enters the room surprised to see her, but he remembers the bargain about Enrique and his ardour is aroused and difficult for Tessa to cool. Then she is saved by an explosion from Dr Helm's office. Tessa runs to help quell the flames with the other townsfolk, with Grisham standing by amused, and the doctor tells her the medicine is destroyed.

Tessa returns home convinced Grisham has the medicine and tells Marta of her suspicions and between them come up with a plan to convince Captain Grisham that he has the fever, forcing him to go to the medicine. The plan involves Tessa allowing Grisham to believe she has given in to his ardour and spike his drink with a drug that would make him sweat and show symptoms of the fever. Meanwhile, Dr Helm, looking through the ruins of his office, finds a fuse plug proving the explosion was deliberate. Reporting to Colonel Montoya that somebody wants him dead, someone with military experience. Grisham is convinced he has the fever and makes an excuse to leave Tessa. Shortly afterwards the Queen is observing Grisham's quarters and watches as he rides off into the desert and surprised to see Dr Helm following.

Helm follows Grisham to an abandoned mine and as Grisham recovers the medicine from its hiding place Helm confronts him. Grisham realises Helm is unarmed and pulls his pistol to kill the doctor. But before he can fire the Queen drops down onto Grisham, the pistol falling to the ground. Getting to their feet the Queen and Grisham indulge in swordplay with Grisham trying all his tricks to overcome the Queen's superior sword skills and one trick succeeds and he overpowers the Queen to a position he can kill her with his sword. Imploring Dr Helm to shoot Grisham with the fallen pistol but being a man who has vowed no longer to kill, he ignores her and fires shooting Grishams's sword in half. Taking advantage of the situation the Queen gains the upper hand. Exhausted the Queen locks Grisham into the mine, and then takes the medicine from the doctor, taking a pinch "for a friend" before returning the medicine to a relieved doctor while complimenting him on the shot.

Later in Santa Helena when the medicine has been distributed and a recovered Montoya fetes the doctor for his bravery and medicine which was salicylic acid from willow bark. Standing alongside is Grisham and Montoya tells him he knows everything, but he still controls him. Tessa and Marta tease the doctor about the Queen of Swords and the doctor admits she is not as bad as he thought.

== Production notes ==
Jean-Louis Airola became swordmaster/stunt co-ordinator for this episode taking over from Anthony De Longis who did production episodes 101-107 excluding 105
