= The Witness (Queen of Swords) =

- Queen of Swords episode
- Episode no.: Season 1 Episode 5
- Directed by: Peter Ellis
- Written by: Steve Roberts
- Cinematography by: Alwyn Kumst
- Production code: 107
- Original air date: November 4, 2000
- Running time: 44 minutes

Guest appearance
- Bo Derek as Mary Rose

Episode chronology
← Previous "Vengeance"	Next → "Duel with a Stranger"

"The Witness" is the fifth episode of the syndicated television series Queen of Swords, airing November 4, 2000.

Tessa witnesses a shooting of a peasant girl. Anton the son of retired sea captain Mary Rose, now a rancher, is arrested. Mary Rose is determined that Tessa will not testify, but equally determined are the girl's brothers that she does. Vera holds the key. Tessa kills for the first time.

== Credited cast ==
Cast as listed at the beginning and end of episode.

- Tessie Santiago as Tessa Alvarado/The Queen
- Anthony Lemke as Captain Marcus Grisham
- Elsa Pataky as Vera Hidalgo
- Peter Wingfield as Dr. Robert Helm (does not appear in this episode)
- Paulina Galvez as Marta the gipsy
- Valentine Pelka as Colonel Luis Ramirez Montoya
- Bo Derek as Mary Rose
- Neil Newbon as Anton
- Christopher De Andres as Arsenio
- Pilar Abella D'Arstegui as Carmina
- Richard Cruz as Geraldo
- Javier Hidalgo as Luke
- Miglen Mirtchev as Vlad
- Juan Valle Avellaneda as a worker

== Plot ==
Evening in Santa Helena, and Tessa Alvarado, in an off-the-shoulder dress, is conspicuously alone amongst the happy couples attending a party, and decides to leave. Captain Grisham offers to be her partner or escort her home, but she dislikes him, and refuses. Walking across the square, she looks up at the hotel window, and sees the shadow of another couple kissing. Then a shot is fired, the window opens, and Carmina, a peasant girl, falls to the ground. A young man, Anton, appears at the window calling Carmina's name, as a curtain is drawn in an adjoining room. Tessa reaches the girl, followed by Captain Grisham, but the girl is dead, and Grisham orders the arrest of the young man. The next morning, Tessa is in the church paying her respects to Carmina, when she is approached by the girl's two brothers asking if she will testify against the young man. She assures them she will, but the elder brother is not convinced, saying Tessa only came to retrieve her shawl she had used to cover the dead girl's eyes. In the square, nine thundering horsemen arrive, and one, turning out to be Mary Rose, a former pirate and the boy's mother, goes to Colonel Montoya's office, and demands Anton's release. Despite pleading her son's innocence - and the threat of her armed men - Montoya maintains the law must take its course as there is a witness, Tessa Alvarado. Mary Rose visits her son in jail, but he is hostile to her, and expects to be hanged, posing an opportunity to the eavesdropping Montoya.

Tessa meets Marta at the blacksmith's and takes their carriage to journey home. On the trail home they are chased all the way back to the Alvarado hacienda by Mary Rose's men who surround the property. Safely inside they discover Mary Rose waiting for them in no mood to allow Tessa to testify against her son - with the threat of death if she does. Tessa returns to town to speak to Colonel Montoya but he is not available, and a chance meeting with a worried Vera Hidalgo is cut short when Vera sees Mary Rose's foreman. Walking through the town, Tessa is watched by Mary Rose's men, unnerving her. When Carmina's brothers grab her and take her to one side, she confirms she will testify, and they let her go, just as she then receives a note from a small boy. Colonel Montoya and Captain Grisham are at the jail trying to goad Anton into confessing, and after the fractious meeting, orders a second scaffold for his mother. A worried Vera goes to her lover Grisham for help, but realises she can't confide in him, and then rides to the Alvarado hacienda to see Tessa. Vera tries to confide in Tessa about the events of the previous evening. Doubts put in her mind, Tessa returns to town to ask Montoya if she can see Anton but Montoya refuses, gleefully expecting (and hoping) Mary Rose will kill Tessa Alvarado, and then he could hang Mary Rose and confiscate both women's land. Montoya is as pleased as can be. Returning along the trail, Tessa Alvarado is pursued by Mary Rose's foreman, Geraldo, waving a note from Mary Rose. Tessa stops her carriage to read the note but it is blank and with one movement Geraldo lifts Tessa from the carriage and throws her to the ground producing a Navaja fighting knife. Tessa evades the knife thrusts and as Geraldo grabs her throat she hold his arm-wielding knife and manages to trip him causing him to fall upon his knife, dead. Shocked by what she has done she returns home to Marta, who points out some home truths that it is not only the Queen that can kill. Mary Rose can't believe a witless girl could kill her foreman and wants the killer found. Montoya plays a waiting game.

Vera, unnerved by seeing the scaffold in the square, meets Montoya but again when she is about to say something about the girl's death, he stops her short with the consequences of speaking for her and her husband Don Hidalgo. Walking on she meets Tessa who demands she tells what she knows. A tearful Vera admits she was next-door with a young man and saw events in the next room when Carmina took Anton's pistol and in a struggle was accidentally killed. She cannot come forward as it would destroy her husband. Montoya is stirring trouble with Carmina's brothers in the church, and then back on the square, Tessa approaches him to tell him she will not testify. Meanwhile, Mary Rose is at the Alvarado hacienda with her men taking Marta as hostage to prevent Tessa testifying. Not that Marta gave up without a fight - she was pouring water from a boiling kettle, and tossed this at her assailants, then, cornered, took up a stance with a hot dry-iron. Tessa returns home to discover from her workers Marta has been taken. The Queen enters Mary Rose's camp and confronts her. A sword fight ensues with the Queen gaining the upper hand and she assures Mary Rose that Tessa Alvarado will not testify. A statement to the disbelieving Mary Rose the Queen has to back up by returning Mary Rose her sword and offering her own life. Satisfied Mary Rose frees Marta.

The next morning Tessa, driving her carriage on the trail to Santa Helena, meets Mary Rose and her men and together ride into town to find Colonel Montoya seated at a table in a crowded town square ready to conduct a trial. To the anger of Carmina's brothers, Tessa refuses to testify, and Montoya insists the trial will go ahead, whereupon Mary Rose draws her pistol and there follows a standoff between Montoya's soldiers and Mary Rose's men. Tessa steps forward and points out if there is blood spilt his would be the first. In the absence of a substantial witness, Montoya decides to free Anton in the interests of justice. A final threat by Carmina's elder brother is dealt with by Mary Rose saying she will seek him out if anything happens to Tessa.

== Production notes ==
Richard Cruz credited as playing Geraldo is also the series horse stunt co-ordinator as Ricardo Cruz. He supplied and trained the horses in the show which included the Queen's horse Chico, Chico's stunt doubles Champion and Escandalo, and Captains Grisham's white horse is named Montero and was the horse ridden by Russell Crowe in Gladiator.

Bo Derek, an accomplished rider chose the horse she would ride after putting two Palominos through their paces.

For the carriage chase and jump Natalie Brassuer and Roberta Brown doubled for Tessie Santiago and Paulina Galvez respectively.

Tessie Santiago had become proficient at driving the two horse carriage for her Tessa Alvarado character and this was utilised for the scene entering Santa Helena with Bo Derek and the other horsemen.

Elsa Pataky was also an experienced rider and rode side saddle, as would be expected of a noblewoman, in the hacienda scene.

When Marta is taken hostage in the kitchen Paulina Galvez performed all the fight action herself with Roberta Brown dressed as Marta if needed.
