= Running Wild (Queen of Swords) =

- Queen of Swords episode
- Episode no.: Season 1 Episode 7
- Directed by: Richard Martin
- Written by: Elizabeth Keyishian
- Cinematography by: Alwyn Kumst
- Production code: 108
- Original air date: November 18, 2000
- Running time: 44 minutes

Guest appearance
- Daisy Fuentes as Isabel Selvera

Episode chronology
← Previous "Duel with a Stranger"	Next → "Honor Thy Father"

"Running Wild" is the seventh episode of the syndicated television series Queen of Swords, airing November 18, 2000.

Three young bandits go on a robbing spree and in the process kill Tessa's godfather. Tessa determined on revenge hatches a plan with Colonel Montoya to capture the robbers.

== Credited cast ==
Cast as listed at the beginning and end of episode.

- Tessie Santiago as Tessa Alvarado/The Queen
- Anthony Lemke as Captain Marcus Grisham
- Elsa Pataky as Vera Hidalgo
- Peter Wingfield as Dr. Robert Helm (does not appear in this episode)
- Paulina Galvez as Marta the gipsy
- Valentine Pelka as Colonel Luis Ramirez Montoya
- Daisy Fuentes as Isabel Selvera
- Freddy Douglas as Ramon Aguilera
- Daniel Fredenburgh as Teodora Selvera
- Xavier Elorriaga as Don Selvera
- Enric Benevent as Don Frederico
- Francisco Lopez Martin as a soldier

== Plot ==
Don Frederico, riding home, spots a girl lying on the trail. Dismounting, he turns the girl over to find she is wearing a wicked fox mask and laughing, as two men ride up to rob him. Quickly getting on his horse, he is chased and finally caught, forced to hand over, on forfeit of his life, the gold he was taking to pay his taxes to Colonel Montoya.

The following day Captain Grisham calls at Don Frederico's hacienda to collect the taxes and is surprised when Frederico is able to pay because he has an angel of mercy, and Tessa Alvarado, his goddaughter, appears at the door. At a ruined coastal house, two of the thieves, brother and sister, Teodora and Isabel Selvera, are discussing their loot when they spy nearby Don Frederico and Tessa walking and chatting about Tessa's mother and father. Suddenly accomplice Ramon, whose father had recently been murdered (ep. 04, "Vengeance"), appears, surprised to see them, and Teodora is worried, but his sister assures him Ramon will not betray them as he loves her.

Later that afternoon Captain Grisham's dalliance with Vera is interrupted by Don Selvera complaining about the thieves and wanting action, unbeknownst to him that his daughter and son, Teodora and Isabel, in the carriage, are the culprits. In the evening back at the dilapidated ruin, the three thieves are discussing their next robbery victim and decide on Tessa Alvarado, but Ramon is reluctant to rob his childhood friend.

The next morning the three burst into the Alvarado hacienda to find Tessa, Marta, and visiting Don Frederico present. Taking gold and valuables, they escape, chased by Don Frederico as they make their getaway. Teodora turns and shoots Frederico and he dies in Tessa's arms. Ramon is shocked and at Don Frederico's funeral tries to comfort Tessa in church, but Isabel and Teodora are present to hear Tessa say her godfather will be avenged.

Colonel Montoya, under pressure from the Dons, is unsympathetic to Tessa, but goes along with her plan to act as decoy to smoke out the thieves. Marta is very unhappy with Tessa as Montoya cannot be trusted. The thieves learn Tessa is carrying her gold in a coach (a ruse) and a reluctant Ramon agrees to one more robbery. On the trail Tessa and Marta (in the coach) are chased and stopped by the thieves under the watch of nearby Montoya, Grisham, and his soldiers. As the robbery unfolds, Montoya stops Grisham intervening, as he hopes Tessa is killed when the thieves discover there is no gold, so that he can get her hacienda. But Montoya's own hopes are not fulfilled and he allows Grisham and his men to capture the thieves. The thieves scatter but Grisham shoots at Ramon, causing his horse to fall, and Tessa is shocked to discover who it is as Grisham takes him to jail. She visits Ramon in his cell, but he refuses to name his partners-in-crime. Meeting Marta outside, Marta points out Ramon saved her life, but Tessa is confused whether justice will be done. When crossing the square, Isabel calls to her father and Tessa recognises her voice, and knows she and her brother, who is with their father, are the other two thieves. Colonel Montoya, under pressure for results from Don Selvera, orders Captain Grisham to try to beat the information from Ramon, but Vera interrupts, indignant at Grisham's treatment of a Don's son, but it is a ploy to discover where the loot is hidden.

With the information Grisham and his men head for the ruined house but Isabel is already there when she is challenged by the Queen, only for Grisham to arrive, and they both hide. Grisham hears a noise, and to protect Isabel, the Queen shows herself, and after engaging Grisham's men, she makes her escape, followed by Grisham and his men allowing Isabel to emerge, and as she is about to leave, the Queen, having lost Grisham, reappears and convinces Isabel to tell the truth to save Ramon. Confessing to Colonel Montoya, Grisham wants to hang all three, but Montoya sees a chance to make money and in the church negotiates 5000 reales and a quarter of Don Silvera's land for his children's lives, but Ramon will be shot by firing squad.

Despite the little matter of a missing candle-stick, Captain Grisham returns the stolen property to Tessa and informs her Ramon is to be executed, and Tessa is shocked that he makes no mention of the other two thieves. Later, at the appointed time, Ramon is led to the execution post with a distraught Isabel screaming to the annoyance of Montoya. As Grisham is about to give the order to fire, the Queen appears riding on top of two horses and dives on to the first man in the firing squad causing the line to collapse like dominoes. She frees Ramon and takes on the garrison single-handed to enable Ramon to escape. In the confusion Ramon calls to Isabel and she jumps onto the horse Ramon has taken, only for her brother Teodora to take a rifle to shoot Isabel. Stopped by his father, allowing Grisham to arrest him. The Queen escapes on Chico, taking along another horse. Meeting Ramon and Isabel outside town, she tells them to go and never come back. Back at the shell of the building by the sea, she sadly reflects with Marta that she has lost two more people, Ramon and Don Frederico
