= Vengeance (Queen of Swords) =

- Queen of Swords episode
- Dr Helm tends the fatally wounded Don Aguilera watched by his son Ramon and Tessa.
- Episode no.: Season 1 Episode 4
- Directed by: Brian Grant
- Written by: James Thorpe
- Cinematography by: Alwyn Kumst
- Production code: 104
- Original air date: October 28, 2000
- Running time: 44 minutes

Episode chronology
← Previous "Fever"	Next → "The Witness"

"Vengeance" is the fourth episode of the syndicated television series Queen of Swords, airing October 28, 2000.

A Don is killed by an assassin and his son, Tessa's childhood friend Ramon, seeks vengeance, but the Queen soon realises Dr Helm was the real target for the assassin's vengeance and Colonel Montoya is prepared to sacrifice the Doctor to kill the Queen. The Queen's first kill, to save Ramon, unbeknown to Dr Helm. Dr Helm flirts with The Queen.

== Credited cast ==
Cast as listed at the beginning and end of episode.

- Tessie Santiago as Tessa Alvarado/The Queen
- Anthony Lemke as Captain Marcus Grisham (does not appear in this episode)
- Elsa Pataky as Vera Hidalgo (does not appear in this episode)
- Peter Wingfield as Dr. Robert Helm
- Paulina Galvez as Marta the gipsy
- Valentine Pelka as Colonel Luis Ramirez Montoya
- James Innes-Smith as Latham
- Freddy Douglas as Ramon Aguilera
- Javier S. Alverez as Don Fuentes
- Julio M. Merino as Don Aguilera
- Edward Hughes as Ian Latham
- George Bulloch as Ranchero

== Plot ==
The harvest festival is in full swing in Santa Helena and Tessa is happily dancing with Ramon and remembering when they were children. Elsewhere in the square an argument between Ramon's father, Don Aguilera, and Don Fuentes develops with Aguilera walking off leaving Fuentes seething. Dr Helm is walking across the square and meets and converses with Don Aguilera when from a rooftop a crossbow bolt is fired hitting Aguilera in the chest. Dr Helm decides to take Aguilera to the closest building, the church, to treat him while a stunned Ramon, looking for the culprit, spies Don Fuentes watching. Treating Aguilera the doctor removes the bolt with Ramon and Tessa looking on, but Dr Helm cannot say if he will survive. Ramon storms out of the church to the rose garden and Colonel Montoya. Accusing Don Fuentes, Ramon is disappointed with Montoya's reply and makes threats against Fuentes if his father should die. Back at the church Dr Helm tells Tessa the crossbow is an assassin's weapon and outside the church, Tessa confides to Marta she must help Ramon as the assassin will return to finish the job.

Don Fuentes assures Montoya he had nothing to do with the assassination attempt but Montoya is unconvinced and has men searching the town for the assassin. At the hotel a soldier enters to search the room of a stranger and is killed. That night the stranger is afoot knocking out a soldier guarding the church and climbs to the roof and a window overlooking Dr Helm watching over his patient. The Queen is also about and spots the stranger taking aim with his crossbow. Preventing him firing she engages the assassin on the roof, both of them falling to the ground then engaging at close quarters with daggers, and in the fight the Queen grabs part of a document the man is carrying. The fight is stopped as soldiers approach and the assassin escapes and the Queen hides in the shadows. The paper has a drawing of Dr Helm and she realises the assassin's real target. When Montoya arrives at the church he finds Ramon outside with his men on guard. Dr Helm emerges from the church and announces Don Aguilera's death.

Returning to his office Dr Helm is confronted by the Queen with the document but he denies it is him, but the plans on the back of the document remind him of a past life in the Napoleonic wars. The Queen admonishes him, and the fact Ramon believes Don Fuentes is responsible, but the doctor rebukes her telling her to stay out of his business. Even later into the night, Ramon enters the Fuentes hacienda but Fuentes is waiting and with two men overpower Ramon. Fuentes swears to Ramon he had nothing to do with his father's death but Ramon is unconvinced leaving Fuentes no choice but to have his men kill Ramon, as he is a family man fearing he has too much to lose if he lets a vengeful foe live. But away from the hacienda so no link can be made. Dr Helm has gone to the hotel room where the assassin had been staying and searches the room. Colonel Montoya having observed a light at the hotel confronts the doctor, and realises Helm is involved somehow. The assassin overhears the conversation from outside the window.

Dawn, and Ramon has been taken to a cliff top by Fuentes' men who intend to throw him off. The Queen appears on her horse and saves Ramon but in doing so kills one of the men, the first time she has killed. She takes Ramon aside and tells him Fuentes had nothing to do with his father's death but he wants proof. She tells him "Today I killed a man to save your life. I won't do it again."

Tessa goes to Dr Helm's office feigning illness to pick his conscience about Ramon's intentions regarding Don Fuentes and it works because the doctor arranges a meeting between Ramon and Don Fuentes in the church, and without explaining why convinces them he was the target. He then leaves them in the church, proceeds to his office, packs his saddlebags and leaves town. On the trail he senses someone following and dismounts letting his horse go. He climbs some rocks so he can jump on his follower. He does but it turns out to be the Queen and she gains the upper hand but he has lost his horse and she has to give him a ride.

The assassin has gone to Montoya's office and struck a bargain that he would kill the Queen and Montoya would give him Dr Helm. A bargain Montoya would renege on when he killed the Queen. Soon the assassin, Montoya and his lancers are in pursuit of the Queen and Dr Helm, not wanting the Queen involved, jumps from the horse causing it to rear up and the doctor falls down a steep hill out of reach. The queen decides to lead Montoya and his lancers away but the assassin remains to pursue Dr Helm. The Queen's plan works as Montoya follows her, but the assassin catches Dr Helm and reveals he is Ian Latham's brother whom Helm had killed in the war and he had come for vengeance. Helm remembers Ian Latham was a spy for the French and that he killed him in self-defence. Montoya's pursuit comes to a halt when he realises the horse tracks he is following are from a riderless horse and makes his way back, but sends his men following the horse tracks.

The assassin now identified as Ian Latham's older brother raises his crossbow to kill the unarmed doctor when the crossbow is forced from his grip by the Queen's whip. Latham and the Queen take their swords, ready to fight, but Dr Helm pleads on behalf of the surprised Queen and she gives the doctor her sword, and Latham and Helm square up to a fight to the death with the Queen looking on. Montoya arrives and engages the Queen, disarming her of the whip with his sword, leaving her with only her dagger, but she overcomes him and they are distracted by the ongoing duel watching Helm knock out Latham. The good Doctor is unable to kill as he had sworn to take no more life. In the distraction Montoya recovers the loaded crossbow but is prevented from shooting the Queen by Dr Helm and she makes her escape. Latham recovers and charges Dr Helm sword in hand and Montoya kills him with the crossbow.

That evening the doctor has returned to his office unpacking to stay and the Queen is waiting for him for an explanation. He will not explain but is pleased to see her, pleasantly surprising her, so he can return her sword!

== Production notes ==
- "Vengeance" was the second episode to be filmed and flashback Napoleonic battle scenes were filmed by director Brian Grant and director Jon Cassar utilised the same time for his battle scenes in episode two "Death to the Queen".
- The whip sequence disarming Latham of his crossbow was done by Tessie Santiago herself and appears every week in the title sequence.
- Anthony De Longis was the swordmaster and stunt co-ordinator for this episode but twelve rolls of undeveloped film of the last fight scenes were lost en route to Toronto for post-production and had to be reshot by French swordmaster Albert Goldberg who was credited with the entire episode.
