= Honor Thy Father (Queen of Swords) =

- Queen of Swords episode
- Tessa desperate for Raul to escape gives him a knife so he can use her as a shield.
- Episode no.: Season 1 Episode 8
- Directed by: Brian Grant
- Written by: Durnford King
- Cinematography by: Alwyn Kumst
- Production code: 103
- Original air date: November 25, 2000
- Running time: 44 minutes

Episode chronology
← Previous "Running Wild"	Next → "Counterfeit Queen"

"Honor Thy Father" is the eighth episode of the syndicated television series Queen of Swords airing November 25, 2000

Churi, a native Indian, follows Montoya's soldiers who have stolen a valuable death mask from his father's grave to Santa Helena. Raul, who was present at the death of Tessa's father, also returns to extract money from Tessa, for information, which she is only too willing to pay no matter who gets in the way. Tessa's hopes go awry when Raul attempts to rape her. The Queen kills, to Dr Helm's horror

== Credited cast ==
Cast as listed at the beginning and end of episode.

- Tessie Santiago as Tessa Alvarado/The Queen
- Anthony Lemke as Captain Marcus Grisham
- Elsa Pataky as Vera Hidalgo
- Peter Wingfield as Dr. Robert Helm
- Paulina Galvez as Marta the gypsy
- Valentine Pelka as Colonel Luis Ramirez Montoya
- Ramon Camin as Raul
- Gael García Bernal as Churi
- Albert Roca as the jailer
- Frank Barri as Gonzalo

== Plot ==
Montoya's soldiers steal valuables from the burial grounds of native Indians, including a gold death mask from a corpse, and take them to Santa Helena followed by Churi, son of the dead man. Tessa Alvarado is in the stable negotiating gold coins with unseemly Raul, a filthy deserter who was present at the death of her father, for information, when Churi, running from Captain Grisham and his men, bursts in, and both Raul, snatching Tessa's gold, and Churi hide. Not wishing to give away Raul's hiding place, she gives up Churi to Grisham, and he is arrested, only for her to discover Raul has gone.

Going into the square to find Raul, Tessa is admonished by Dr Helm for letting Churi be captured and she spies Raul has also been captured and is being taken to Captain Grisham. Under interrogation, Raul refuses to say where he got the gold, and is thrown into jail alongside Churi in an adjoining cell. That evening Tessa discusses with Marta that the Queen must release Raul. Marta reads the tarot cards and ponders the meaning with Tessa. The next morning the Queen, dressed as a nun, engineers Raul's escape taking Churi as well, who calling her 'Angel' senses who she is. Under fire from Grisham and his soldiers they escape into the desert, and resting the horses, the Queen discovers Churi has been badly wounded. Unwilling to help, Raul rides off. Grisham reports back to Colonel Montoya who is puzzled as to why the Queen of Swords would free Raul.

The Queen takes the unconscious Churi to the Alvarado hacienda, but she realises she and Marta cannot treat him, so as the Queen she takes him to Dr Helm's office who is not best pleased with the Queen for getting Churi shot. She returns to the Alvarado hacienda as the Queen and Raul, intending to get more gold, sees her and rides off noticed by Marta. Surrendering to Captain Grisham he is prepared to betray the Queen's identity for gold, but Montoya is dubious, yet allows Grisham to be led to the Queen. Meanwhile Churi is determined to recover the death mask to honor his father but Dr Helm tells him it is locked in Montoya's strongroom. Churi secretly leaves Helm's office.

Grisham cannot believe Raul when he leads them to the Alvarado hacienda and finds Tessa and Marta tied up and claiming the Queen of Swords was responsible. Raul protests and in the ensuing argument Tessa palms him a knife which he uses to hold Tessa so he can make his escape. Later that day Raul returns to the Alvarado hacienda and finds Tessa at the stable and wants more gold. An angry Tessa says she will pay but Raul wants more than gold and advances towards her and a fight begins and Raul momentarily traps her against a carriage and begins to lift her skirts. Freeing herself she runs from the stable up the hill to her parents' graves, grabbing a wooden pitchfork on the way. At the graveside, Raul, sword in hand, goads Tessa about the death of her father and a vicious fight with pitchfork and sword ensues culminating in Tessa killing Raul, ending her hopes of discovering the truth about her father's death. Crying, she vows if her father cannot have justice, Churi's father will.

That evening Dr Helm, looking for Churi, discovers him in the rose garden trying to break into Montoya's office, but too weak to continue. Helm agrees to get the mask and breaks into Montoya's office via the window. As he is about to open the secret room the Queen surprises him. Together they enter the room and the barred strongroom. Taking the Queen's dagger, Helm picks the lock, to the Queen's surprise. Giving back the dagger, Helm takes the death mask and reentering Montoya's office is confronted by a guard raising his pistol. The Queen throws her dagger killing the guard to Dr Helm's horror, but she ushers him outside as Montoya enters the room. A swordfight ensues and the fight involves Montoya and his soldiers. Ending on the veranda when the Queen escapes by leaping to her horse below.

Back at Dr Helm's office he is treating Churi's wound having given him the mask. When the Queen comes for Churi, Dr Helm is furious with the Queen for killing the soldier even if to save his life. The story ends where it began at the burial grounds with Churi honoring his father watched by an angel at his side, The Queen of Swords.

== Production notes ==
- The scene when the Queen dressed as a nun knocks out the guard with a Bible was cut failing to show the footage of a brick hidden in the bible.
- During the pitchfork fight the director Brian Grant allowed the fight to get out of hand and when Tessie Santiago was caught by Rauls sword, on the cheek, stunt co-ordinator Anthony De Longis stepped in to stop the action and found she also had a bruised and bleeding little finger,
