= Honor Thy Father (disambiguation) =

Honor Thy Father is a 1971 book by Gay Talese

Honor Thy Father may also refer to:

- "Honour thy father and thy mother", one of the Biblical Ten Commandments
- Honor Thy Father, a 1973 television film based on the Talese book.
- Honor Thy Father (film), a 2015 Filipino crime drama
- "Honor Thy Father" (Arrow) a 2012 television episode
- "Honor Thy Father" (Queen of Swords) a 2000 television episode
- "Honor Thy Father", a 2003 song by Dream Theater from Train of Thought

== See also ==
- "Honor Thy Fathers", a 2017 episode of Arrow
- Honor Thy Mother (disambiguation)
