= Queen of Swords (TV series) =

Canadian action–adventure television series

- Genre: Action/adventure/western
- Created by: David Abramowitz; Linda Lukens
- Starring: Tessie Santiago; Anthony Lemke; Elsa Pataky; Peter Wingfield; Paulina Gálvez; Valentine Pelka
- Theme music composer: Steve Plunkett, and; Philip Proffer
- Opening theme: "Behind the Mask" sung by José Feliciano
- Composers: Philip Stanger; John Herberman
- Countries of origin: Canada; Spain; United Kingdom
- Original languages: English; Spanish
- No. of seasons: 1
- No. of episodes: 22 (list of episodes)

Production
- Executive producers: David Abramowitz; Jay Firestone; Adam Haight
- Producers: Ken Gord; Tony Thatcher
- Production locations: Texas Hollywood, Tabernas Desert, San Jose, Alcazaba of Almeria in Almeria, Spain
- Cinematography: Alwyn Kumst
- Running time: 45 min.
- Production companies: Fireworks Entertainment; Morena Films; Amy International Productions; Telefonica; M6; Mercury Entertainment; Costume & Production Services

Original release
- Network: Global (Canada); Syndicated (USA)
- Release: October 7, 2000 – June 6, 2001

Queen of Swords is a Canadian action–adventure television series set in California during the early 19th century that ran for one season from 2000 to 2001.

The series premiered October 7, 2000. After filming had been completed on 22 episodes and the first eight episodes were broadcast, the series was cancelled.

== Plot ==
In 1817, a young Spanish aristocrat, Tessa Alvarado, returns to Spanish California after the death of her father and finds her home in ruins, her father's manservant reduced to stealing. The town where she was born is run by a militaristic governor who abuses his power, resulting in the miscarriage of justice and the poor living conditions of his subjects.

Upset about the state of her birthplace and the murder of her father, Tessa's path is revealed to her in a mysterious dream where her father comes to her and talks of his murder, his hidden gold, and of his "avenging angel". She will take up arms to protect the people from the town's governor and to avenge her father's death. To protect those she loves, Tessa fashions the persona of the masked "Queen of Swords".

Tessa thus embarks on two different lives: Tessa Alvarado, the foppish heiress, and the Queen of Swords, defender of the poor and oppressed against the corrupt local government.

== Characters ==
- Tessa Alvarado/Queen of Swords (Tessie Santiago). Doña María Teresa (Tessa) Alvarado, born in California and sent by her father, Don Alvarado, to Madrid at the age of seven to further her education. In her early twenties, Tessa has been taking fencing lessons from Maestro Juan Torres (Anthony De Longis), when she learns of her father's death and returns to California to take over her father's hacienda. The Queen is never depicted as physically stronger than her opponents, winning by being more skilled or using the element of surprise and when the odds are too great, running away to fight another day.
- Marta (Paulina Gálvez), a gypsy employed to look after Tessa when she arrived in Madrid to live with her uncle, aunt, and three cousins. She returns with Tessa and keeps her feet on the ground with home truths about her life and destiny. Marta has great knowledge of the tarot. The Queen of Swords name comes from one of Marta's tarot cards.
- Colonel Luis Ramirez Montoya (Valentine Pelka), son of a lowly diplomat and a wealthy mother. The corrupt and tyrannical governor of Santa Helena, ruthless and cares little for human life other than his own. He believes in executions without fair trials, enslaves the poor people of the town, and blackmails the powerful Dons and has the knowledge to hold Grisham and Vera under his thumb.
- Captain Marcus Grisham (Anthony Lemke), an American deserter who escaped execution for killing his commanding officer during the War of 1812. His own self-interests test his loyalty to Montoya on a number of occasions and the mission of ridding Montoya of the troublesome Queen of Swords, which his soldiers have a hard time accomplishing due in part to the inaccurate single shot weapons.
- Señora Vera Hidalgo (Elsa Pataky), the young and unfaithful trophy wife of Don Hidalgo (Tacho González) with a dubious past. Friend of Tessa, lover of Captain Grisham, and spy for him and Colonel Montoya.
- Don Gaspar Hidalgo (Tacho Gonzalez), along with Tessa's late father, is one of the richest and influential among the Dons.
- Dr. Robert Helm (Peter Wingfield), an English doctor employed by Montoya to tend his soldiers and local citizenry who believes in saving lives rather than taking them after his experiences as an officer in the Napoleonic Wars. He has little patience for Tessa, believing her to be a spoiled member of the nobility and less for the Queen of Swords, despising her because of her use of violence and willingness to kill. Helm's relationship with the Queen of Swords intensifies throughout the series as events throw them together in life-threatening situations.

As in the theme song "Behind the Mask", all the characters have secrets to hide, which are explored over the 22 episodes.

== Production ==
=== Casting ===
Almost immediately after signing with an agent, series star Tessie Santiago went to her first professional audition, an open casting call that Fireworks Entertainment was conducting in a nationwide search for the lead role. Though a blonde with light skin and light eyes, Santiago dyed her hair black a week before the audition to look more "Hispanic". Her audition led to several callbacks, with a final test screening in Los Angeles, California, and she won the lead role of Tessa Alvarado.

The part of Colonel Montoya was written specifically for Valentine Pelka by David Abramowitz, who phoned Pelka in October 1999 to offer him the part, subject to approval by the other show producers.

Abramowitz met Peter Wingfield at a Highlander convention in November 1999 and offered him the parts of Doctor Helm or Captain Grisham. Wingfield chose the doctor as a part with more mileage and more challenging.

=== Filming ===
Director of photography Alwyn Kumst used Super 16mm film, which has a slightly smaller widescreen aspect ratio to 16:9.

The series was filmed May 3, 2000 to December 12, 2000, in Spain, principally at Texas Hollywood, Almería and the surrounding Tabernas Desert with coastal locations at San José near Almería. The Alcazaba of Almería was used as Madrid and the gardens as Don Hidalgo's hacienda garden. The Western buildings of Texas Hollywood were also used for the series, with the Western jail serving as the Spanish jail, and one of the large Western buildings was converted into a sound stage containing the living quarters of both Senorita Alvarado and Col. Montoya.

The flashback episode "End of Days" had new material of approximately 22 minutes, which were filmed in Spain, and its interior mine scenes were filmed at Pinewood Studios, London.

The first episode to be filmed was "Death to the Queen", directed by Jon Cassar, who set the style of the series. The soldiers's uniforms were changed after this episode to resemble a uniform that, more realistically, would have been used in a Spanish backwater community. "Vengeance" was the second episode to be filmed and was directed by Brian Grant. Next Jon Cassar stepped in to direct episode one, "Destiny" which was the third episode to be filmed. "Destiny" was written by James Thorpe using the same sets for the Napoleonic Wars scenes that director Brian Grant was using to film "Vengeance" at the same time. During 2009 personal correspondence with Jon Cassar, this process was clarified as follows: "That is exactly how we shot those shows." He noted that "it takes as long to prep[are] a show as to shoot it. So I directed the first one, [and] while I prepped the third, another director shot the second, then I shot the third. So once I was there I didn't leave until I was done."

==== Locations ====
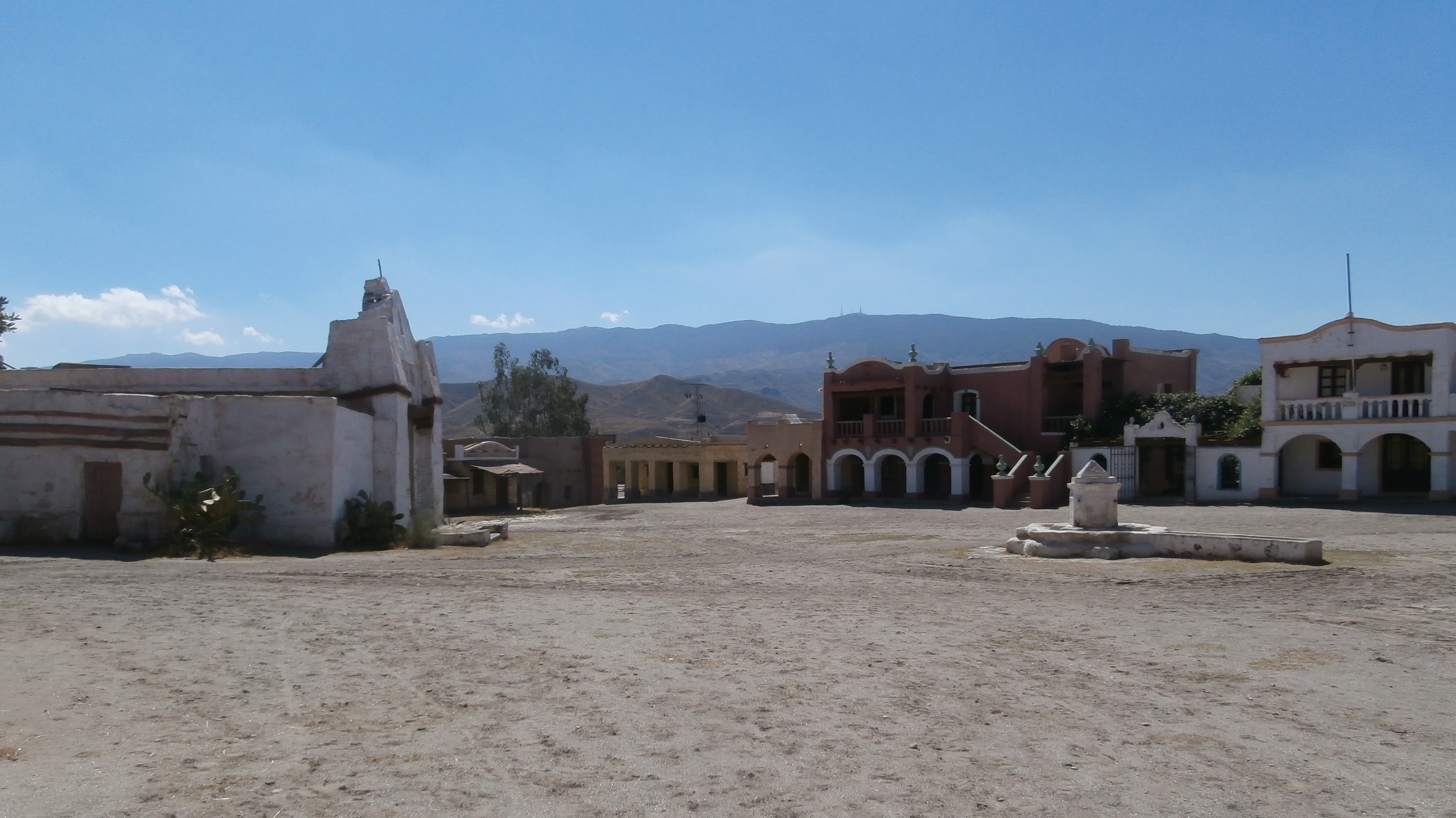
Spanish pueblo at Texas Hollywood

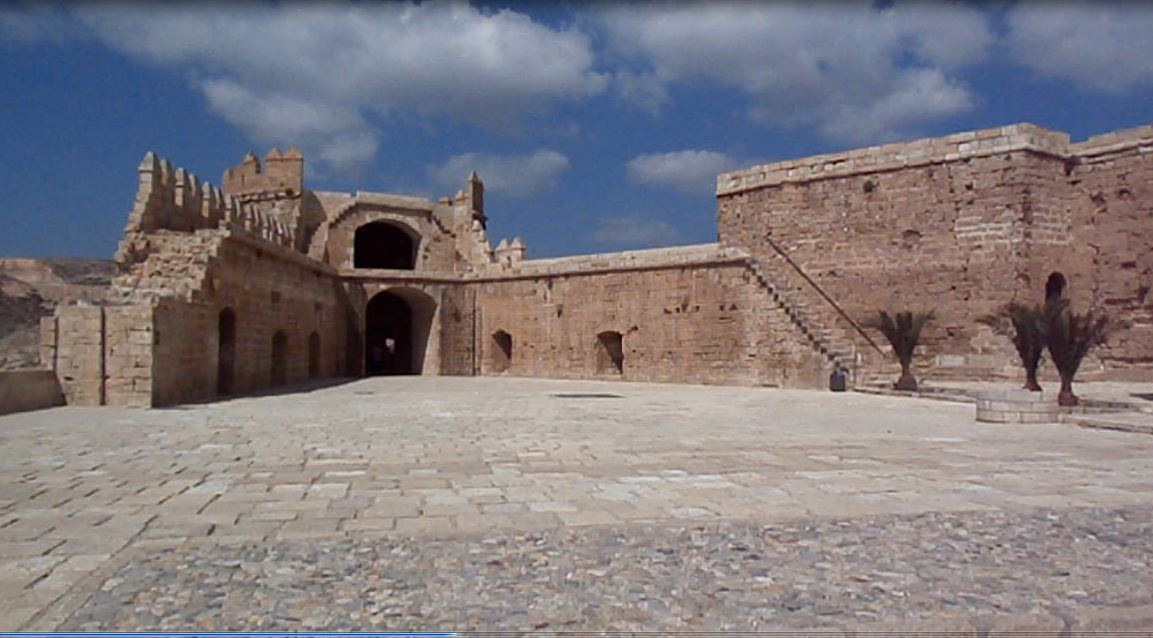
The courtyard at the Alcazaba of Almería was dressed for the Madrid training sequence.

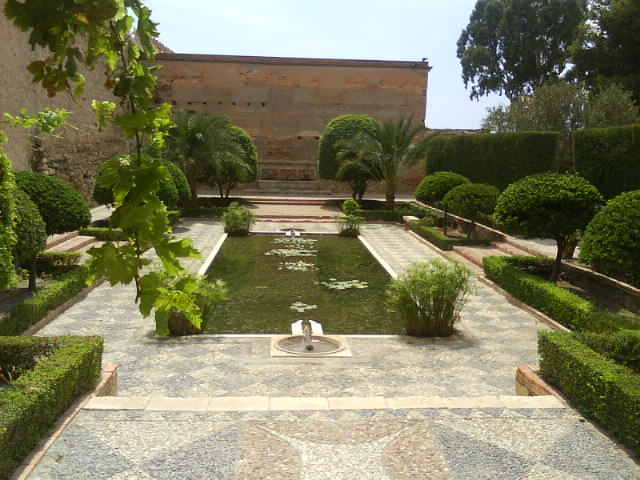
The gardens of The Alcazaba of Almería were used as Don Hidalgo's hacienda garden.

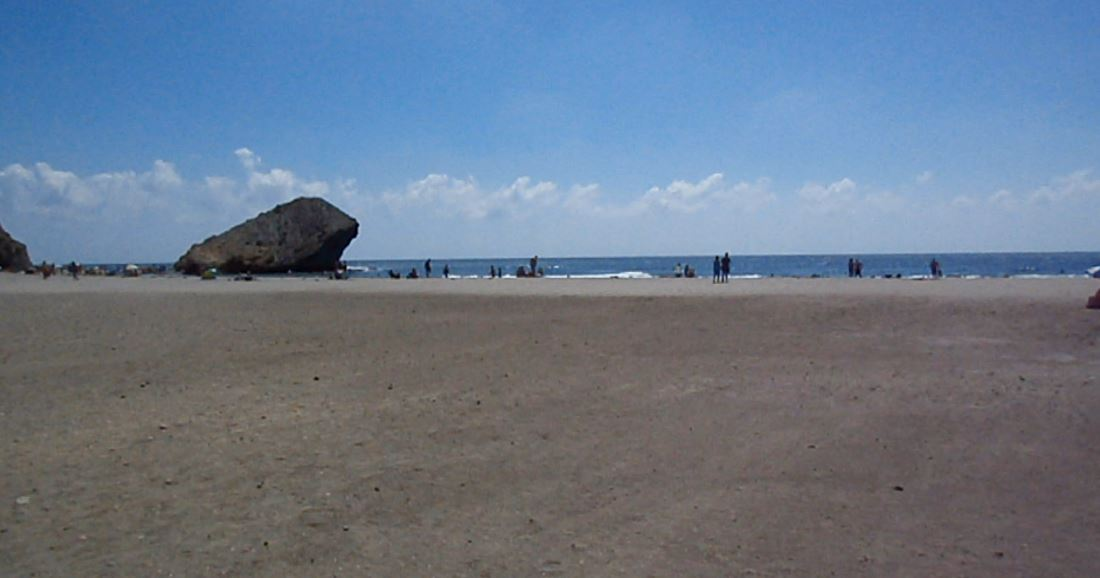
The Playa de Mónsul was used in coastal scenes.

=== Horses ===
Horse stunt co-ordinator Ricardo Cruz supplied and trained the horses throughout the series which included the Queen's horse, Captain Grisham's white horse, and a highly trained black horse for Colonel Montoya. Cruz, credited as Richard Cruz, had one credited part in the episode "The Witness".

The Queen's horse is called Chico, his real name, mentioned only once in the entire series in the episode "The Pretender". He had two stunt horse doubles, Champion and Escandalo, for different action scenes. His bridle and breastplate were identical to that used by Zorro's horse in the Alain Delon film Zorro (1975) and the U.S. television series Zorro (1990). The film and TV series were filmed in Spain.

The white horse that Grisham rides is named Montero and was the horse ridden by Russell Crowe in Gladiator, a film Ricardo Cruz worked on.

While playing the role of Colonel Montoya, Valentine Pelka rode the horse named Salan. Salan died at the end of filming the series.

Bo Derek, an accomplished rider, chose the horse she would ride in the episode "The Witness" after putting two Palominos through their paces.

=== Stunts ===
Anthony De Longis was the Swordmaster/Stunt Co-ordinator on the first six production episodes (101-107, not 105). He is not credited in episode 104 because the 'film rushes' from the last sword-fight scene were lost on the way to Canada for processing and editing. So the scenes had to be reshot with French swordmaster Albert Goldberg who is credited with the entire episode.

The Queen of Swords was portrayed by newcomer Tessie Santiago, who provided the voice, close-up face of the character, and character interaction. Anthony De Longis trained Tessie Santiago for two months in pre-production in California in the use of the rapier and dagger in the Spanish mysterious circle (Destreza) style, and use of the whip. He purposely created complicated and extended phrases of rapier and dagger choreography and taught them to Tessie Santiago, as he recognized that, in episodic television, time is always restricted. There was a month off between training and cameras rolling in Spain with only a few days of prep before Santiago climbed to the top of a cliff to shoot her first scene in "Death to the Queen". This was a two-on-one fight scene in 40 mph winds and with a little adjustment and fine-tuning to location and situation, Santiago was able to perform all her own swordplay confidently in this opening sequence.

Three other women helped portray the Queen of Swords. A double stands in for the "star" actor for long shots. This happened in a few instances in Queen of Swords, such as in the shot of the Queen lying on the beach face down in the episode "Death to the Queen", or the shot in the same episode of the Queen's gloved hands being loosened from their bindings. The main character in Queen of Swords required great skill in horseback riding, swordsmanship, the bullwhip, and knife fighting.

Natalia Guijarro Brasseur was originally hired to perform the role of the Queen in scenes requiring specific physical skills. Some of the American producers of the series included the producers of Highlander: The Series, as well as the swordmaster Anthony De Longis. But during initial rehearsals for the series in Spain, before filming began, De Longis and producer Ken Gord recognized that Natalia Brasseur was not as talented with the sword as they needed. This forced Los Angeles-based executive producer David Abramowitz to contact the fencing instructor/actress/swordmaster who had tested and helped producers cast the role of the Queen of Swords, Roberta Brown. Brown was flown to Spain, where she appeared in the first five episodes as sword double for the Queen. She also appeared as Marta in carriage-chase scenes and Mary Rose's sword double in the seventh episode. In the meantime, Brasseur doubled for the Queen in stunt horse scenes and some falls. When the producers found that they needed to use their limited American visas for other guest stars and crew members, De Longis and Brown were dismissed from the series before the first hiatus in filming. The producers brought in French fencer Gaëlle Cohen as a replacement.

Other performers who portrayed the Queen during the series included Mary Gallien (who later became Dr. Mary De Longis) and Mary Jose. In the episode "Hanged Man", male stuntman Curro doubled for the Queen to perform one of the most dangerous stunts in a Western involving a moving wagon and horses, when dressed as the Queen, Curro jumped from the wagon onto the horses then passed under the horses and wagon, grabbed a trailing rope and was dragged along the ground from where he hauled himself back on to the rear of the wagon. This was performed in the style of Yakima Canutt, who had first performed the stunt in the films Stagecoach and Riders of the Dawn.

Regarding the need for so many performers for one character, swordmaster Anthony De Longis wrote on his website: "You don't learn sword skills over night, especially when you're busy performing all the other action for a new episode every week."

The need for four women to perform the role of the Queen is exemplified in the Queen's run up the hill away from the soldiers in "Death to the Queen". Mary Gallien started the run up the hill, Roberta Brown performed the medium shot duel with swords on the hill, Tessie Santiago performed the spoken parts and was in the close-up, and Natalia Brasseur fell off the cliff as the Queen of Swords.

Jean-Louis Airola became swordmaster/stunt co-ordinator on episodes 105, 108–119. Michel Carliez episodes 120, 121 (Spain), 122. Richard Hammatt 121 (London).

=== Music ===
The show's incidental music was composed by Phillip Stanger, with music editor Kevin Banks and additional music by John Herberman.

The show's theme, a song titled "Behind the Mask", was written and composed by Spencer Proffer and Steve Plunkett and performed by José Feliciano. Only the last verse is featured in the opening titles. The full unpublished English version is available on YouTube, sung by José Feliciano with Spencer Proffer and Steve Plunkett, and a promotional video exists of José Feliciano in Spanish but again never released; this was filmed by Tom Laurie at The Texas Hollywood Studios, Tabernas, Almería, Spain.

== Cast ==
Left to right: Tacho Gonzalez, Elsa Pataky, Peter Wingfield, Anthony Lemke, Tessie Santiago, Paulina Gálvez, Valentine Pelka

- Tessie Santiago as Doña María Teresa (Tessa) Alvarado/The Queen of Swords
- Paulina Gálvez as Marta
- Valentine Pelka as Colonel Luis Ramirez Montoya
- Anthony Lemke as Captain Marcus Grisham
- Peter Wingfield as Doctor Robert Helm
- Elsa Pataky as Señora Vera Hidalgo
- Tacho Gonzalez as Don Gaspar Hidalgo

Guest stars include David Carradine, Cyrielle Clair, Bo Derek, Cristián de la Fuente, Daisy Fuentes, Elizabeth Gracen, Sung-Hi Lee, Simon MacCorkindale, Ralf Moeller, and Jose Sancho.

While credited as a full cast member, Peter Wingfield appears in 9 episodes plus a flashback episode.

Peter Wingfield, Elizabeth Gracen and Valentine Pelka all worked together in Highlander: The Series as recurring characters. Pelka, also, guest starred in the 1990 series Zorro, filmed in Madrid, in the episode "All That Glitters".

British actors played many Spanish parts: Valentine Pelka (Colonel Montoya), Ed Stoppard (Ambassador Ramirez), Grant Russell (Uncle Alejandro), Freddy Douglas (Ramon), Dan Fredenburgh (Tedora Selvera), Richard Clifford (The Viceroy), Steve Emerson (Padre Quinterra), Stephen Billington (Bernardo), Oliver Haden (Leonardo), Alex Hassell (Andreo Rey), Neil Newbon (Anton), Frank Barrie (Gonzalo), and Darrell D'Silva (Armando). Yasmin Bannerman played a black slave (Agatha) and Burt Kwouk played a Japanese warrior priest. Other British actors included James Innes-Smith (Latham), Edward Hughes (Ian Latham), Michael Culkin (Edward Wellersley), Simon MacCorkindale (Capt. Charles Wentworth), Amanda Batty (Camila Wentworth), and Darren Tighe (Fenner).

== Episodes ==
No.	Title	Directed by	Written by	Original release date	Prod. code
1	"Destiny"	Jon Cassar	James Thorpe	October 7, 2000	101
Tessa Alvarado returns to Spanish California on the death of her father to find her home in ruins and the area under the control of a tyrant, Colonel Montoya. From a dream about her dead father and his 'Avenging Angel', Tessa becomes the Queen of Swords. Stars Jose Sancho
2	"Death to the Queen"	Jon Cassar	Jocelyne Barque Simmons	October 14, 2000	102
Colonel Montoya plots to kill The Queen when she attempts to find missing peasants he is using in a gold mine. Dr Helm arrives in Santa Helena and makes an impression on Tessa and meets the captured Queen of Swords.
3	"Fever"	Paolo Barzman	Scott Kraft	October 21, 2000	105
Fever sweeps Santa Helena. Marta and Colonel Montoya fall victim and Captain Grisham takes the opportunity to let Montoya die when he acquires Dr Helm's medicine. Dr Helm realises The Queen is not as bad as she is painted.
4	"Vengeance"	Brian Grant	James Thorpe	October 28, 2000	104
A Don is killed by an assassin and his son, Tessa's childhood friend Ramon, seeks vengeance, but the Queen soon realises Dr Helm was the real target for the assassin's vengeance and Colonel Montoya is prepared to sacrifice the Doctor to kill the Queen. The Queen's first kill, to save Ramon, unbeknown to Dr Helm. Dr Helm flirts with The Queen. Stars James Innes-Smith, Freddy Douglas, and Edward Hughes
5	"The Witness"	Peter Ellis	Steve Roberts	November 4, 2000	107
Tessa witnesses a shooting of a peasant girl. The son of a retired sea captain Mary Rose, now a rancher, is arrested. Mary Rose is determined that Tessa will not testify, but equally determined is the girl's brothers that she does. Vera holds the key. Tessa kills for the first time. Stars Bo Derek, Neil Newbon.
6	"Duel with a Stranger"	Richard Martin	Elizabeth Keyishian	November 11, 2000	106
Colonel Montoya employs a professional swordsman to kill The Queen after seeing him humiliate Captain Grisham in a test of his prowess. The swordsman from Madrid is Antonio, Tessa's old sweetheart. Stars Cristián de la Fuente
7	"Running Wild"	Richard Martin	Elizabeth Keyishian	November 18, 2000	108
Three young bandits go on a robbing spree and in the process kill Tessa's godfather. Tessa determined on revenge hatches a plan with Colonel Montoya to capture the robbers. Stars Daisy Fuentes, Freddy Douglas, and Dan Fredenburgh.
8	"Honor Thy Father"	Brian Grant	Durnford King	November 25, 2000	103
Churi, a native Indian, follows Montoya's soldiers who have stolen a valuable death mask from his father's grave to Santa Helena. Raul, who was present at the death of Tessa's father, also returns to extract money from Tessa, for information, which she is only too willing to pay no matter who gets in the way. Tessa's hopes go awry when Raul attempts to rape her. The Queen kills, to Dr Helm's horror. Stars Gael García Bernal
9	"Counterfeit Queen"	Peter Ellis	Gillian Horvath	January 13, 2001	110
A woman posing as The Queen is captured, after robbing the Santa Monica – Monterey stage, by Colonel Montoya and Captain Grisham and they realise the situation can be turned to their advantage by discrediting The Queen of Swords. Stars Elizabeth Gracen
10	"The Serpent"	Jorge Montesi	Steve Roberts	January 20, 2001	112
The Queen wounds El Serpiente, a notorious bandit, and he needs Dr Helm's attention leading to a conflict of loyalties with The Queen as their relationship intensifies. Dr Helm breaks his oath. Stars David Carradine
11	"The Pact"	Carlos Gil	Elizabeth Keyishian	January 27, 2001	115
Captain Grisham learns from Vera of a pact between Tessa's late father Don Alvarado and Don's Miguel and Hidalgo to bury the gold of Don Horatio, killed by Colonel Montoya in a duel. Grisham sees a chance to get rich but reckons without Montoya and The Queen. To spite Montoya, Grisham does not take an opportunity to shoot The Queen.
12	"The Emissary"	Peter Ellis	Clint Lien	February 3, 2001	116
Ambassador Ramirez arrives in Santa Helena with a plan to kill The Queen and take her head back to Spain in a jar. With him is English journalist Edward Wellesley, attached to the Spanish Court, to record the events as they unfold and maybe meet The Queen whose exploits have become famous with the ordinary people of Spain. Colonel Montoya feels threatened by the ambassador's presence and the attention he gives to Captain Grisham. Stars Ed Stoppard Michael Culkin
13	"Kidnapped"	George Mendeluk	Elizabeth Baxter	February 10, 2001	117
Barnardo, a man from Vera's past, kidnaps her for ransom. Don Hidalgo has to borrow the money from Colonel Montoya and Captain Grisham delivers it, but Barnardo wants the gold and Vera and only the intervention of The Queen thwarts his plan. Shocking revelations about Vera's past threaten her marriage to Don Gaspar. Stars Stephen Billington
14	"The Uncle"	Jorge Montesi	Durnford King	February 17, 2001	114
Tessa's Uncle, Don Alejandro, arrives from Spain to find his brother's murderers and take Tessa, from the barbaric colonies, home to find her a suitable husband. Ready to pay a large reward, he becomes a target for local bandits and for Colonel Montoya and Captain Grisham, for whom the truth would condemn. Stars Grant Russell.
15	"Runaways"	George Mendeluk	Toby Roberts	February 24, 2001	119
Two slaves, Agatha and Jeffrey, assisted by Camilla, the wife of a sadistic English sea captain, escape to shore. Camilla goes on to Santa Helena to seek help from Colonel Montoya. Montoya gets involved seeking to turn the situation to his advantage in obtaining a cannon. Dr Helm discovers the captain's wife was his bride to be. Camilla has no intention of going back to her husband but rekindles her love with Dr Helm. The Queen has to step in to save first Dr Helm and then Camilla so they can be reunited. Stars Simon MacCorkindale, Amanda Batty, Yasmin Bannerman.
16	"Hanged Man"	Paolo Barzman	Steve Roberts	April 21, 2001	109
Krane, a ruthless old comrade of Grisham's, takes control of Santa Helena when Montoya is away plans to rob the Don's. Grisham is helpless and only The Queen and the Don's wives can help but they don't trust The Queen. Marta tries to solve the situation by killing Krane. Stars Anthony De Longis Emile Abossolo M'Bo
17	"The Return"	Paolo Barzman	Scott Kraft	April 28, 2001	111
When Marta's love from Spain arrives in Santa Helena and is arrested for murder, Montoya wants to use him to kill Don Hidalgo and Marta's loyalties to Tessa are tested. The Queen has to step in to save him and watch as he and Marta go on the run. Stars Oliver Haden
18	"The Pretender"	Peter Ellis	James Thorpe	May 5, 2001	113
When a newly arrived Spanish lawyer is murdered it has deadly consequences for Tessa's friend Andreo Rey when his own parents accuse him of the murder and Montoya plots to gain control of the Rey Hacienda. Stars Cyrielle Clair, Jorge Montesi, Alex Hassell.
19	"Takes a Thief"	Paolo Barzman	Elizabeth Keyishian	May 12, 2001	120
Two con-men offer their services to capture The Queen for the reward but on meeting The Queen change their minds. Montoya imprisons one until the other carries out the job. Stars Ralf Möller, Darren Tighe.
20	"The Dragon"	Terry Ingram	Durnford King	May 19, 2001	118
Master Kiyomasa and his disciple Kami from a cult of Japanese warrior priests are ambushed by Armando and his gang. The Master is killed and the son of Armando is fatally wounded. Both Kami and Armando want revenge and Colonel Montoya seeing that Kami is skilled in martial arts and more than a match for The Queen convinces her that The Queen is the leader of Armando's gang despite Dr Helm, Marta, and Tessa's protestations. Stars Sung-Hi Lee, Burt Kwouk and Darrell D'Silva.
21	"End of Days"	Brian Grant (London), Norma Bailey (Texas Hollywood)	Scott Kraft	May 26, 2001	121
Grisham and The Queen, trapped in the same mine destroyed in episode two, are slowly suffocating, giving them time to remember past encounters and with Grisham's ardour far from diminished, despite their predicament, the chance to finally unmask The Queen. Episode containing approximately half new material and half flashback.
22	"Betrayed"	Norma Bailey	James Thorpe	June 2, 2001	122
Vera lies in a coma and Grisham blames The Queen. Don Hidalgo demands The Queen's death and Montoya readily imposes martial law and to conceal the truth orders Grisham to kill Vera sorely testing his love for her.

== Accolades ==
Awarding Body	Award	Nominee	Result
ALMA Awards	Outstanding lead actress in a syndicated drama series (2001)	Tessie Santiago	Nomination together with Tia Carrere and the winner Gina Torres

== Broadcast ==
Despite being a part UK production it was not shown in the UK until 2008 on the Zone Thriller channel. It was shown in a cropped 4/3 pan and scan format, although it had been filmed in wide-screen 16/9, with some profanities and scenes deleted as compared to transmissions in other countries. In December 2009 it moved to the Film24 channel as well as continuing on Zone Thriller's successor CBS Action. Zone Thriller and CBS Action broadcast in production order and Film24 in Episode order.

=== Also known as ===
- France: Tessa, à la pointe de l'épée (DVD; Sous le signe de l'épée)
- Spain: Reina de Espadas
- Portugal: Raínha de Espadas
- Hungary: A Kardok királynöje
- Finland: Miekan lumo
- Estonia: Mõõgakuninganna
- Poland: Królowa miecza
- Greece: Vasilissa tou xifous I
- Italy: La regina di spade
- Russian dub. in Ukrainian TV: Королева мечей
- Ukrainian: Королева мечів
- Bulgaria: Царицата на рапирите
- Germany: Die Maske der Königin
- Kosova: Mbretëresha e shpatave
- Slovakia: Kráľovná mečov

== Home media ==
=== VHS release ===
A limited edition VHS set with all 22 episodes was released at the end of 2001, when after the show had been cancelled, a cult following had grown. A small survey had been done with fans of the show by the show's producers, Fireworks Entertainment, where fans had voted for a VHS release at the then official Queen of Swords website (Fireworks noted they would not be making DVD collections of the series during the survey). The set was manufactured in Canada by Fireworks themselves and was sold by CanWest Global. It was made available only through online ordering to customers in the United States and Canada (NTSC region 1 format) through the official Queen of Swords website linked through Fireworks' official website at the time. It was an 8 volume VHS set, limited to under 1,000 sets made. The first tape contained episode 1 while the remaining 7 tapes contained 3 episodes each, with the series presented in the cropped broadcast 4:3 pan and scan format. The set cost $99.99 US/$149.99 Canada, plus shipping costs. A certificate of authenticity card sheet was also released with the set, inside the box of the first tape volume. The VHS set sold out within months. A promised special addition to the first episode's tape was not included with initial earlier pressed tapes delivered to customers, a ninth tape (which was a re-issue of the first episode volume, this time with the bonus content added at the end; the bonus material included was a lengthy set of clips and promo scenes from the series with the theme song "Behind the Mask" being played) was later sent to all who purchased the sets from CanWest. Subsequent orders that were made afterward were with the corrected volume 1 video.

=== DVD release ===
In Japan the series was released between July and November in 2004 by Happinet Pictures. There were ten DVDs available in total. There were two episodes per DVD combined into one 85 minute film with one opening title and a double credit list at the end. They were generally in no particular order and the two missing episodes are The Pretender and Takes a Thief. The DVDs are uncut Region 2 with the original English soundtrack, Japanese dubbing, and Japanese subtitles 4:3 Pan and scan NTSC, with Dolby Digital sound.

In France the series was released in 2006 by Elephant Films under the title 'Sous Le Signe de L'Épée'. The DVDs are the French version Tessa, à la pointe de l'épée uncut on a multiregion in a six DVD box set with the original English soundtrack, French dubbing, and French subtitles, 16:9 widescreen as it was filmed, in PAL with Dolby Digital sound. The episodes are in production order (see List of episodes). Includes an episode booklet in French.

== Legal issues ==
In August 2000, writer Linda S. Lukens sought a preliminary injunction to block the premiere of Queen of Swords unless she were given a "created by" credit, saying she had submitted a script of that name and a similar series treatment to ABC two decades earlier, and that both she and the show's executive producer, David Abramowitz, were both represented by the Broder/Kurland Agency, which was also named in the suit. In October 2000, a Los Angeles Superior Court judge ordered a halt to further broadcasts of the show unless Lukens received that credit. Linda Lukens is not credited on the official Japanese or French DVDs.

On January 24, 2001, Sony Pictures Entertainment filed a lawsuit in United States District Court, Central District of California, Western Division, against Fireworks Entertainment Group, the producers of Queen of Swords. Sony alleged copyright infringement and other claims, saying the series "copied protectable elements from [the] 'Zorro' character and 'Zorro' related works". On April 5, 2001, U.S. District Judge Collins denied Sony's motion for a preliminary injunction, noting, among other points, "that since the copyrights in [Johnson McCulley's 1919 short story] The Curse of Capistrano and [the 1920 movie] The Mark of Zorro lapsed in 1995 or before, the character Zorro has been in the public domain". As to specific elements of The Mask of Zorro, the judge found that any similarities between the film and the TV series' secondary characters and plot elements were insufficient to warrant an injunction. Judge Collins subsequently vacated her ruling following an unopposed motion filed by Sony Pictures, TriStar Pictures, and Zorro Productions, Inc.
