= José Sancho =

Spanish actor (1944–2013)

- Born: José Asunción Martínez; 11 November 1944; Manises (Valencia), Spain
- Died: 3 March 2013 (aged 68); Valencia, Spain
- Other name: Pepe Sancho
- Occupation: Actor
- Spouse(s): María Jiménez; Reyes Monforte

José Asunción Martínez (11 November 1944 – 3 March 2013) better known as José Sancho or Pepe Sancho, was a Spanish actor. Over a period of fifty years he appeared extensively in Spanish television and films. He was perhaps best known internationally for his roles in Pedro Almodóvar's films Live Flesh and Talk to Her.

== Private life ==
Sancho was born in Manises (Valencia), Spain, in 1944. He married and divorced twice the singer María Jiménez (with whom he had a son named Alejandro) and, after his second divorce with Jiménez, he married journalist Reyes Monforte, from 2006 until the death of the actor in 2013.

He was a cousin of the Spanish Socialist Party politician Antoni Asunción.

Sancho died March 3, 2013, with 68 years old in Valencia after a long illness from a lung cancer.

== Career ==
Sancho's first film role was when he was aged just four in Si te hubieses casado conmigo (1948), directed by Victor Tourjansky. He became popular thanks to his role as The Student, in Televisión Española series Curro Jiménez (1977–1978), directed by Pilar Miró, Mario Camus, Antonio Drove, Rafael Romero Marchent, Francisco Rovira Beleta and others.

Almost twenty years after that work, he returned to star in another television series, Carmen y familia (1995), together with Beatriz Carvajal and his former partner in Curro Jiménez, Álvaro de Luna. One year later, he joined up with Rocío Dúrcal in Los negocios de mamá (1997), also for television.

Among his many roles in films is his collaboration with Pedro Almodóvar in Talk to Her and in Live Flesh along with Javier Bardem, where he won the Goya Award for Best Supporting Actor in 1997.

In 2000 he guest-starred as Don Rafael Alvarado in the syndicated television series Queen of Swords, who is murdered in the first episode, "Destiny", causing his daughter Tessa to take up arms as the title character.

His involvement in several films and theatrical activity was significant, but his role of Don Pablo, in Televisión Española series Cuéntame cómo pasó, from 2001 to 2008, brought his greatest popularity and recognition.

== Filmography ==
- El clan (2012)
- En fuera de juego (2011)
- King Conqueror (2009)
- El libro de las aguas (2008)
- Las tierras altas (2008)
- El síndrome de Svensson (2006)
- Desde que amanece apetece (2006)
- Siempre Habana (2005)
- El desenlace (2005)
- Kibris: La ley del equilibrio (2005)
- Las llaves de la independencia (2005)
- El espantatiburones (2004, voice of don Lino)
- Trileros (2003)
- Besos de gato (2003)
- Diario de una becaria (2003)
- Los Reyes Magos (2003, voice of Alfredo)
- Cosa de brujas (2003)
- Hable con ella (2002)
- Saint Anthony: The Miracle Worker of Padua (2002)
- El deseo de ser piel roja (2002)
- La mujer de mi vida (2001)
- Stranded (2001)
- Arachnid (2001)
- ¡Ja me maaten...! (2000)
- Kasbah (2000)
- Sexo por compasión (2000)
- Hijos del viento (2000)
- París Tombuctú (1999)
- Los lobos de Washington (1999)
- Flores de otro mundo (1999)
- Carne trémula (1997)
- Libertarias (1996)
- Los hombres siempre mienten (1995)
- Mar de luna (1995)
- Todos a la cárcel (1993)
- La Lola se va a los puertos (1993)
- ¡Ay Carmela! (1990)
- Montoyas y Tarantos (1989)
- El Dorado (1988)
- ¡Biba la banda! (1987)
- Wheels on Meals (1984)
- Perdóname, amor (1982)
- ...Y al tercer año, resucitó (1980)
- La boda del señor cura (1979)
- El virgo de Visanteta (1979)
- Visanteta, estáte quieta (1979)
- Avisa a Curro Jiménez (1978)
- Proceso a Jesús (1973)
- Con ella llegó el amor (1970)
- Amor a todo gas (1969)
- Acompáñame (1966)
- Jugando a morir (1966)
- Dos mil dólares por Coyote (1966)
- Fuerte perdido (1965)
- Suena el clarín (1965)
- Canadian Wilderness (1965)
- Sol de verano (1963)
- Pachín (1961)
- El frente infinito (1959)
- El gran Galeoto (1951)
- Si te hubieses casado conmigo (1948)
