= The Cell 2 =

2009 film

- Official DVD cover
- Directed by: Tim Iacofano
- Screenplay by: Lawrence Silverstein; Alex Barder; Erik Klein; Rob Rinow
- Story by: Alex Barder; Lawrence Silverstein
- Produced by: Alex Barder; Lawrence Silverstein
- Starring: Chris Bruno; Tessie Santiago; Frank Whaley
- Cinematography: Geno Salvatori
- Edited by: John Coniglio
- Music by: John Massari
- Production companies: Silvestein/Barder Company; New Line Cinema
- Distributed by: Warner Home Video
- Release date: June 16, 2009
- Running time: 93 minutes
- Country: United States
- Language: English

The Cell 2 is a 2009 direct-to-video sequel to the 2000 film The Cell. Directed by Tim Iacofano and written by Lawerence Silverstein, Alex Barder, Erik Klein, and Rob Rinow, the movie is similar in themes as the original, about an investigator who must enter the mind of a serial killer.

== Plot ==
Starring Chris Bruno as Sheriff Harris, the movie is about a serial killer calling himself "The Cusp", who murders his victims and then revives them, until they beg to die. His first victim, psychic investigator Maya Casteneda (Tessie Santiago), survives and is bent on revenge. After she is tapped by the FBI, Maya realizes the only way to locate The Cusp is by entering his mind. But if she dies there, she will also die in real life.

== Cast ==
- Tessie Santiago as Maya Casteneda
- Chris Bruno as Sheriff Harris
- Michael Flynn as Kessel
- Bart Johnson as FBI Skylar
- Frank Whaley as Duncan
- Amee Walden as Penelope
- Charles Halford as Deputy Finch
- Paul Kiernan as Coroner

== Release ==
The Cell 2 was released on DVD in the United States on June 16, 2009. It was named one of the worst movies of 2009 by Bloody Disgusting.
