= Honor Thy Mother =

Honor Thy Mother may refer to:

- "Honour thy father and thy mother", one of the Biblical Ten Commandments

== Film ==
- Honour Thy Mother, a 1928 German silent film
- Honour Your Mother, a 1951 Argentine film
- Honor Thy Mother (film), a 1992 television film about the murder of Lieth Von Stein

== Television ==
=== Series ===
- Honor Thy Mother (TV series), an upcoming Philippine drama series

=== Episodes ===
- "Honor Thy Mother" (7th Heaven), 2005
- "Honor Thy Mother" (Cheers), 1991
- "Honor Thy Mother" (For the People), 2002
- "Honor Thy Mother" (Franklin & Bash), 2014
- "Honor Thy Mother" (Roseanne), 1996

== Other uses ==
- Honor Thy Mother, a 1997 Shi / Daredevil crossover comic book by Gary Cohn
- Honor Thy Mother, the theme of the 2016 McDonald's Gospelfest

== See also ==
- Honor Thy Father (disambiguation)
