= Twentysixmiles =

- Also known as: Catalina Island
- Starring: John Schneider; Eric Lange; Angela Oh; Jordan Garrett; Spencer Locke; Jessica Tuck; Tessie Santiago
- Country of origin: United States
- Original language: English
- No. of seasons: 1
- No. of episodes: 6

Production
- Executive producers: Susan B. Flanagan; Rob Miller; Bidwell C. Tyler II; Kevin Guzowski; Mike Petty

Twentysixmiles is a 2010 American TV series.

== Plot ==
Jack Kincaid (John Schneider) had life figured out. With a wife, two kids, and a successful career at an investment firm, Jack was living the life most men dream about. While Jack was a winner in the boardroom, he could not figure out how to balance a successful career with a successful marriage. Ultimately, Jack's wife Keri (Jessica Tuck) filed for divorce. Keri decides to raise their children, 15 year-old Walt and 11 year-old Emma in a calmer, more idyllic lifestyle – on the picturesque island of Catalina, 26 miles off the coast of Southern California, where her brother lives. Aided by Sean Murphy, Jack's former best friend, former brother-in-law, and former band member, he rediscovers life as a father, and even catches the eye of beautiful local, Jennifer (Tessie Santiago). When Sean proposes the ultimate idea – that he and Jack reunite their college band 'The Renegades' – Jack soon finds that his dreams never did die, they just went on hiatus.

== Cast ==
- John Schneider as Jack Kincaid
- Eric Lange as Sean 'Murph' Murphy
- Angela Oh as Charlene
- Jordan Garrett as Walt Kincaid
- Spencer Locke as Sally Burnish
- Jessica Tuck as Keri Kincaid
- Tessie Santiago as Jennifer Calderon
- Aris Alvarado as Manny
- Hannah Leigh as Emma Kincaid
- Kelly Finley as Amanda Burnish
- Daniel Quinn as Dirk Stillwell
- John Billingsley as Dennis
- Candice Afia as Lindsay
- Bonita Friedericy as Sister Consuela
- Kimberly Caldwell as Taylor
