= Alcazaba of Almería =

Moorish fort complex in Southern Spain

- Alcazaba de Almeria
- Almería, Andalucía, Spain
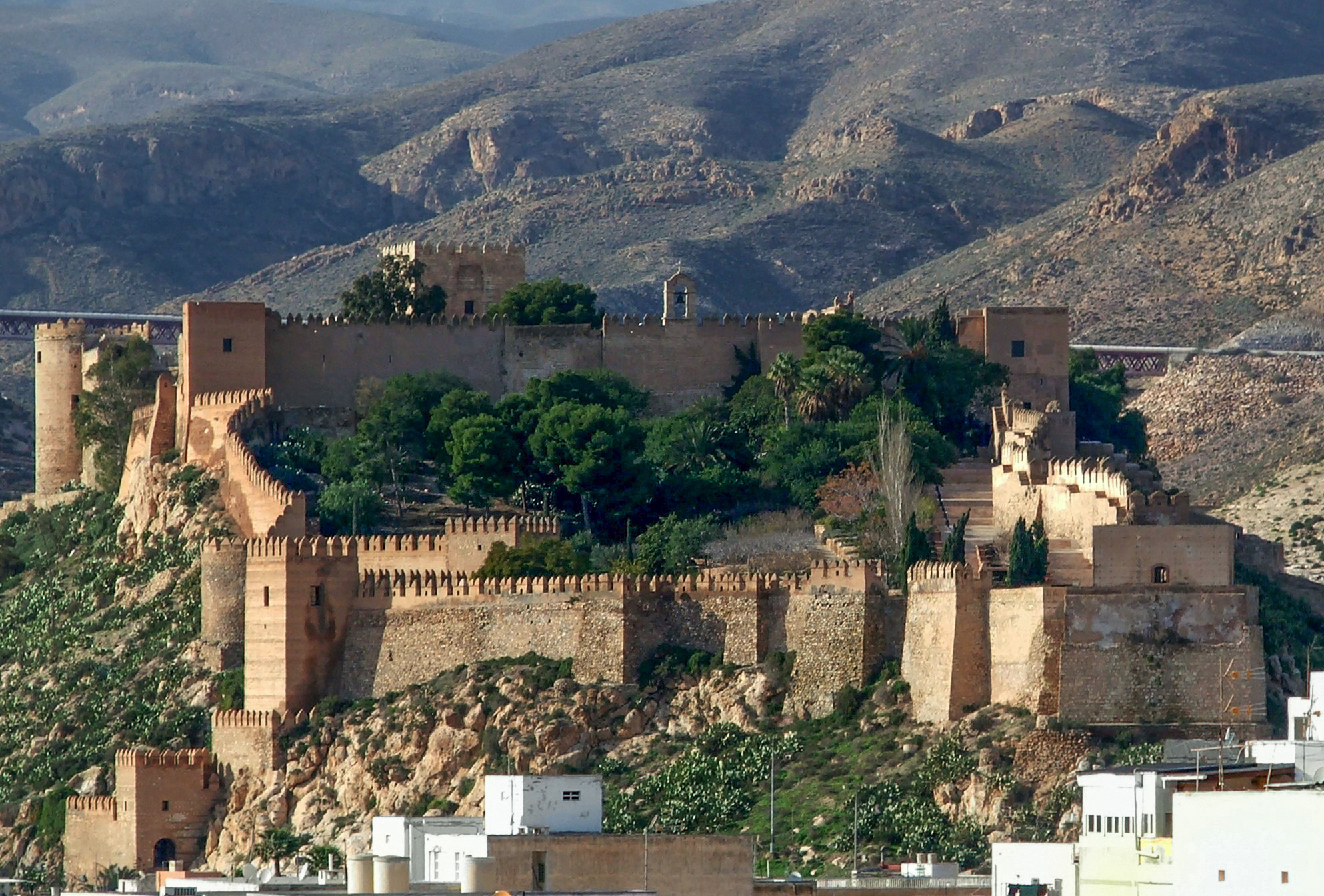
- The Alcazaba taken from the east overlooking the first enclosure

Site information
- Type: Fortress
- Open to the public: yes

Location
- Coordinates: 36°50′28″N 02°28′19″W

Site history
- Built: 10th century
- Built by: Abd ar-Rahman III

The Alcazaba of Almería is a fortified complex in Almería, southern Spain. The word alcazaba, from the Arabic word (القَصَبَة; al-qaṣabah), signifies a walled fortification in a city.

== History ==
In 955, Almería was given the title of medina ("city") by the Caliph of Cordoba Abd ar-Rahman III, when the construction of the defensive citadel located in the upper sector of the city began. Provided not only with walls and towers but also with squares, houses, and a mosque, it was to be the seat of the local government, commanding the city and the nearby sea.

The complex was enlarged under caliph Al-Mansur and again under Khayran as-Saqlabi, the first king of the independent taifa of Almería.

Its purpose was to protect the area's largest city at the time, Pechina.

Most of the objects from the archaeological site at the Alcazaba are kept in the Museo de Almería, but some are in the Museo de la Alhambra.

The renowned Muslim scholar Abul Walid Al-Baji was reported to be buried within the grounds of the citadel according to the biographical work of Ibn Bashkawal writing around 50-60 years later.

== Description ==
The first line of walls is a wide enclosure corresponding to the first Muslim military camp, used as shelter for the population in case of siege. For this task it was provided with large cisterns.

The first enclosure is separated by the second one by the so-called Muro de la Vela ("Wall of the Sail"), taking its name from a bell that warned the population in case of events such as the arrival of a ship in the port, danger, fires etc. This wall was built by King Charles III of Spain.

In the second enclosure was the residence for the governors, their soldiers and their servants. It included also the mosque, baths, tanks, tents etc.

The third enclosure, the most external, is also the most modern in the complex. After the Christian reconquest of Almería, the Catholic monarchs Isabella I of Castile and Ferdinand II of Aragon had a castle built in the most elevated sector of the town, more apt to resist the new gunpowder artillery.

== Cinema ==
The Alcazaba has been used to film Conan the Barbarian, Indiana Jones and the Last Crusade, Never Say Never Again, and most recently Wonder Woman 1984. The syndicated TV series Queen of Swords used the inner courtyard and gardens.

The sixth season of the TV series Game of Thrones was shot in locations from Andalusia to Catalonia, including the Muralla de Jayrán, and the Alcazaba fortress, which is the capital of Dorne, the kingdom of the House Martell.

== Gallery ==
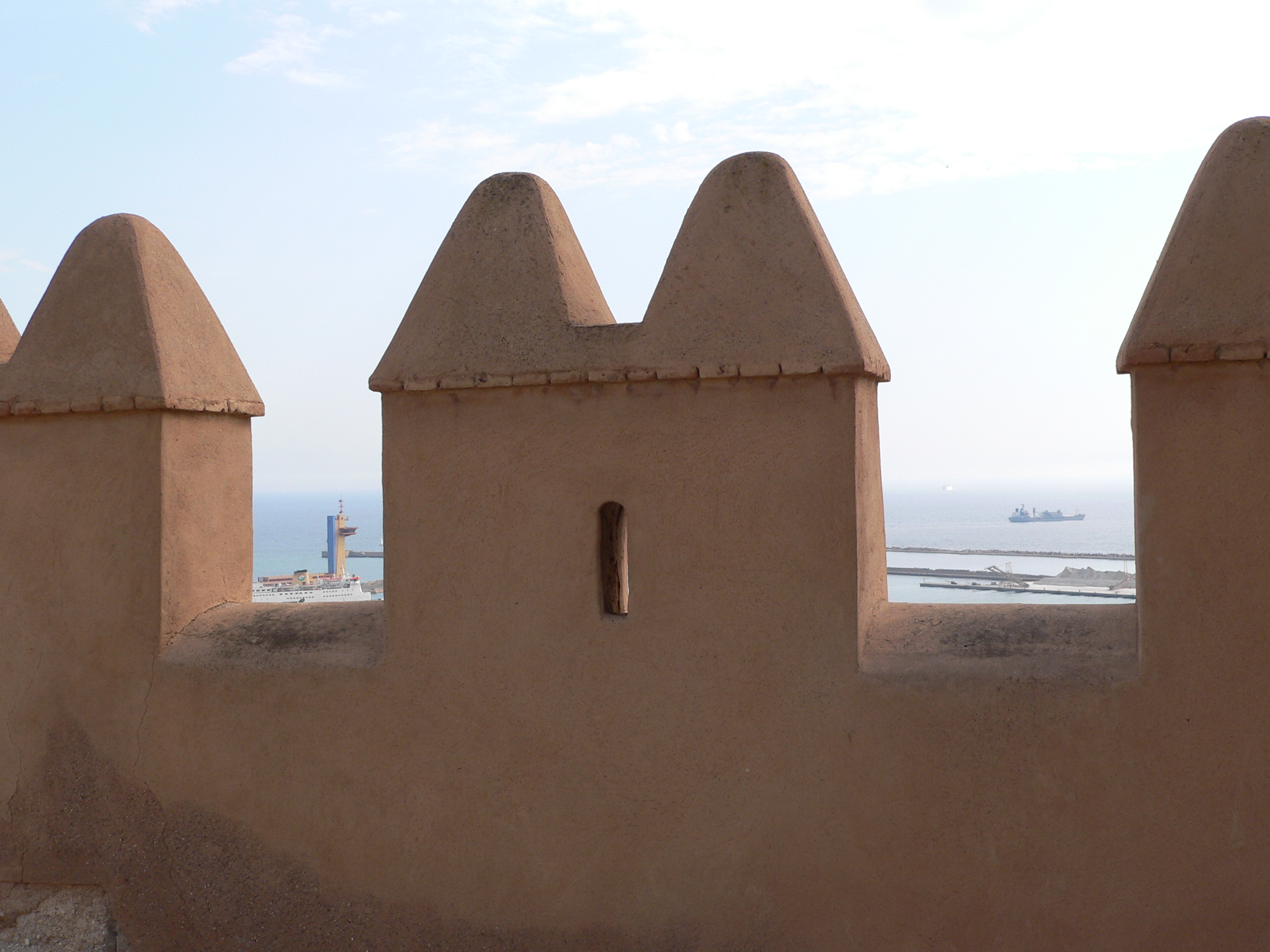
Merlons of the walls.

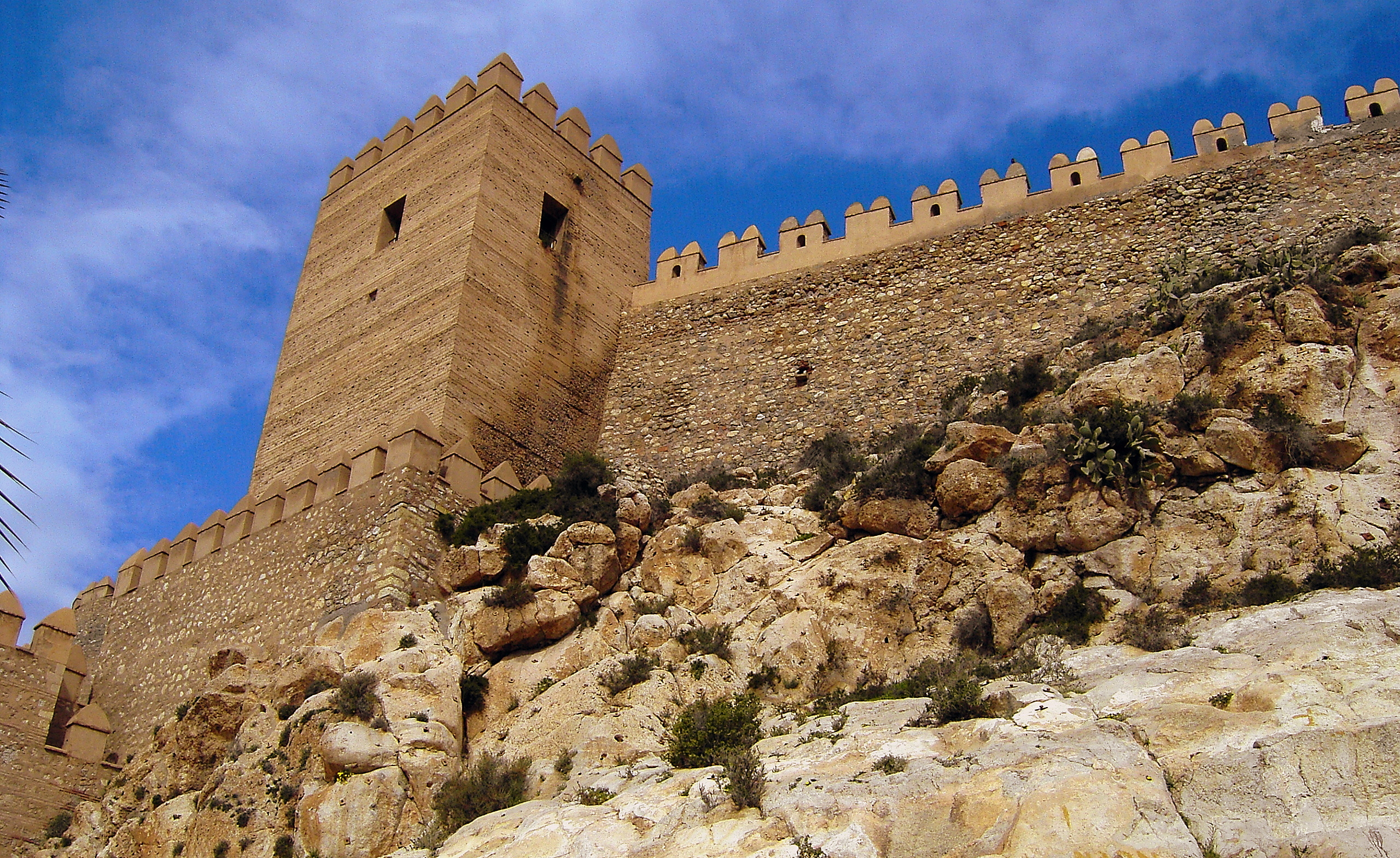
The walls with defensive tower.

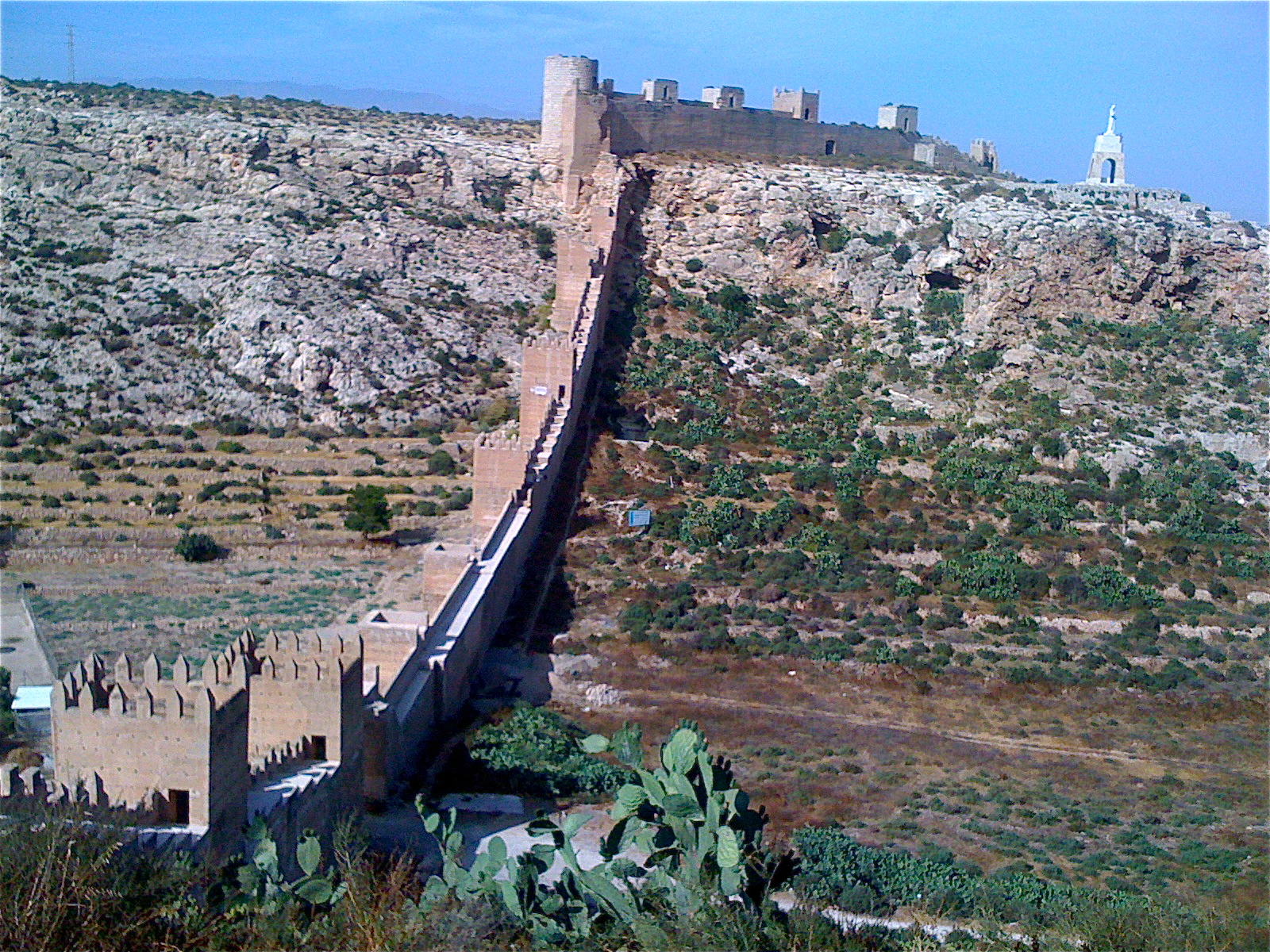
Wall of the Alcazaba.

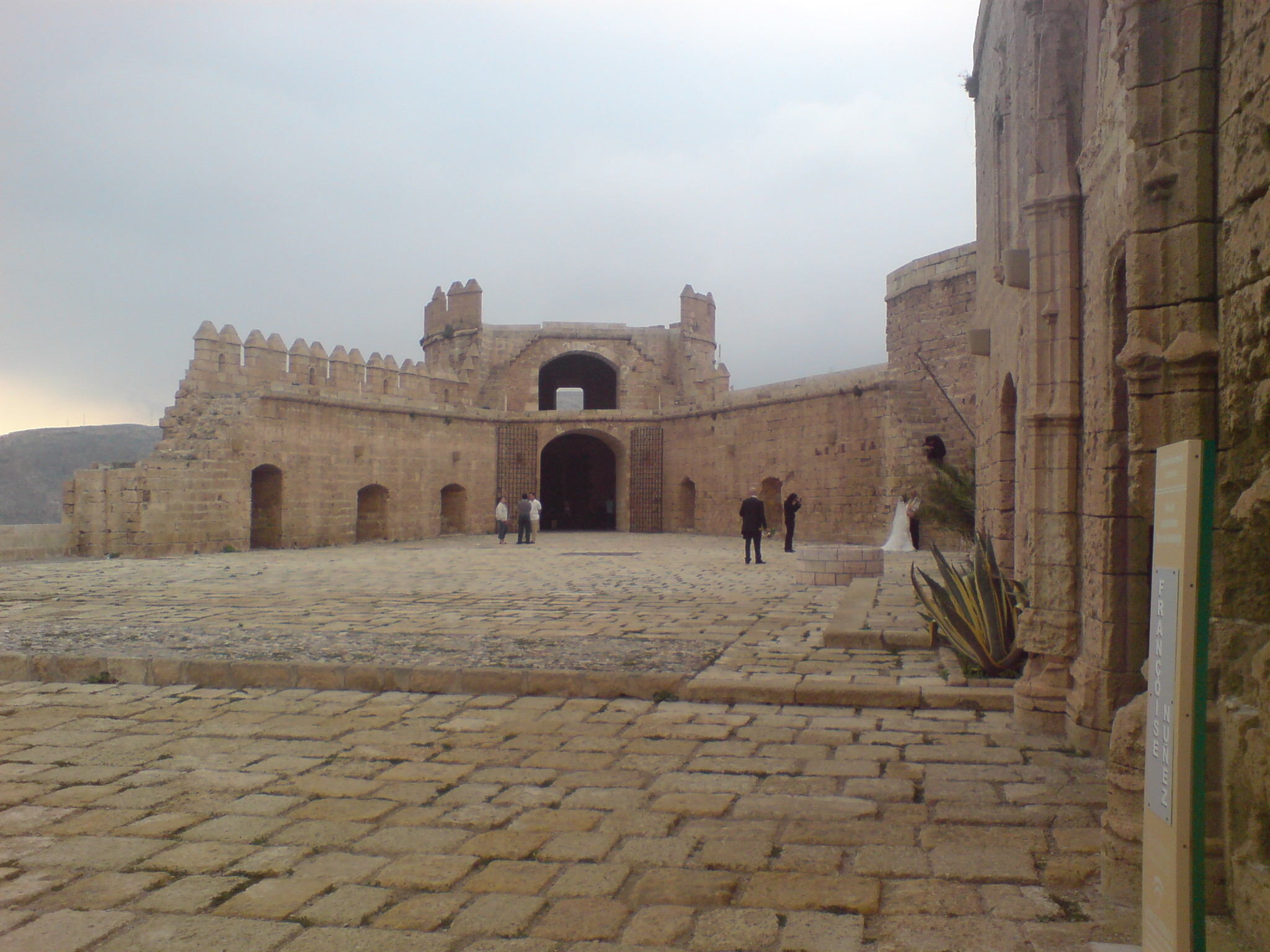
Inner courtyard.

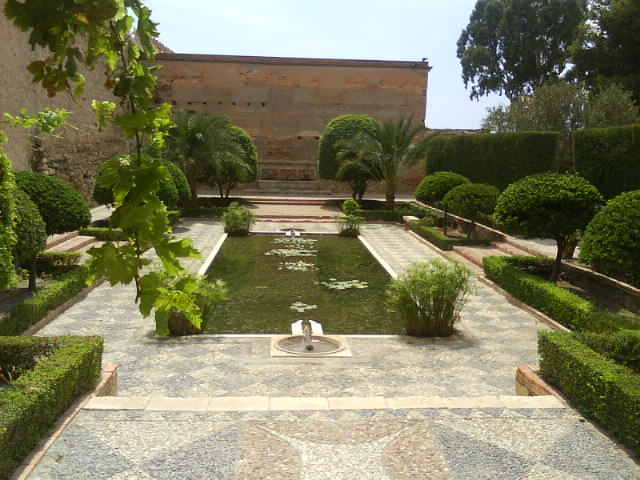
The gardens

== See also ==
- History of Islam in Spain
