= Paulina Gálvez (actress) =

Chilean-Spanish actress

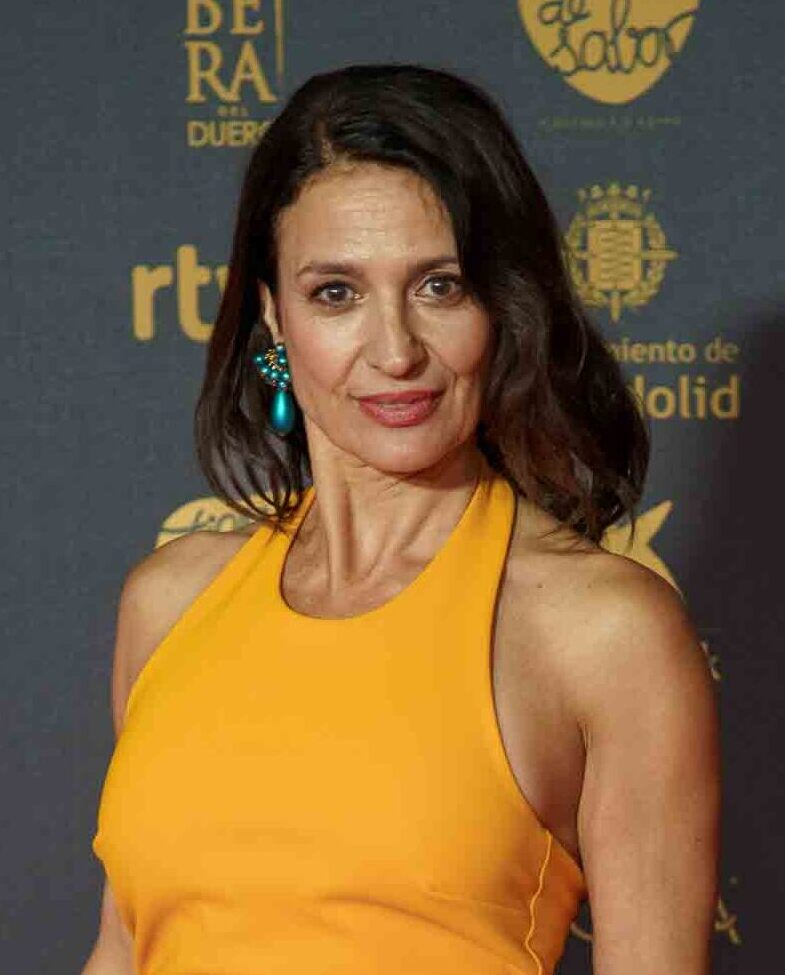
- Born: September 14, 1965 (age 60); Santiago de Chile, Chile
- Occupation: Actress
- Spouse: Alexis Valdés (divorced)
- Website: https://www.paulinagalvez.com/

Paulina Gálvez (born September 14, 1969) is a Chilean-Spanish actress.

== Biography ==
She was born in Santiago to a Spanish parents who were both economists. She was raised in Madrid from the age of eight and started her artistic career as a flamenco dancer in several companies in Spain (Carmen Cortes, Zambra). She later moved to film, getting the lead role in her first audition for the film Bazar Viena alongside Alfredo Landa. After few years working in film and television, Paulina worked in theatre with the famous experimental Catalan group Els Joglars, from Barcelona. Since then she has played more than 90 different characters ranging from comedic to dramatic in theater, films and television, with renowned directors and actors such as Carlos Saura, Javier Bardem, Federico Luppi, Mel Gibson, James Spader, among many others.

In 2000, she played Marta, the Gypsy servant in the American series Queen of Swords for Paramount Television and, along with Tessie Santiago, was one of only two actors to appear in all 22 episodes of the TV series filmed at Texas Hollywood, Almería, Spain. She later appeared in the series Dueños del Paraíso for Telemundo, starring Kate del Castillo, and in the Bambú production for Atresmedia, La embajada. In 2018 she was cast as Catalina in the television series based on the film The Purge, produced by Blumhouse for the USA Network. She was a regular character in the TV series Panhandle and appears in the gran finale episode of The Blacklist.

== Partial filmography ==
- Bazar Viena (1990)
- Tango (TV Series) (1992)
- Orden especial (1992)
- Kosh ba kosh (1993)
- Poble Nou (1994)
- The detective and the death (1994)
- Una chica entre un millón (1994)
- Los baúles del retorno (1995)
- Esperanza & sardinas (1996)
- Sitges (TV Series) (1996)
- Hospital (TV Series) (1996)
- Corsarios del chip (1996)
- Retrato de mujer con hombre al fondo (1997)
- La banda de Pérez (TV Series) (1997)
- Pajarico (1997)
- Nada en la nevera (1998)
- The Pianist (1998)
- La rosa de piedra (1999)
- El secreto de la porcelana (TV Mini-Series) (1999)
- Tuve un sueño contigo (1999)
- Rincones del paraíso (1999)
- Tattoo Bar (2000)
- The Place That Was Paradise (2000)
- The Lost Steps (2001)
- Honolulu Baby (2001)
- Queen of Swords (2000–2001)
- L'Auberge Espagnole (2002)
- Hospital Central (TV Series) (2002)
- Flamenco der Liebe (TV Movie) (2002)
- Passionate People (2002)
- Subterra (2003)
- Rottweiler (2004)
- Face of Terror (2004)
- Cien maneras de acabar con el amor (2004)
- The Nun (2005)
- Un rey en la Habana (2005)
- Al filo de la ley (TV Series) (2005)
- Projecte Cassandra (TV Movie) (2005)
- El precio de una Miss (TV Movie) (2005)
- Star Troopers (2006)
- Faltas leves (2006)
- Monógamo sucesivo (2006)
- Hermanos & detectives (TV Series) (2007)
- Trenhotel (TV Movie) (2007)
- Un cuento para Olivia (2008)
- El Cartel de los Sapos (TV Series) (2008)
- Acusados (TV Series) (2009)
- Suspicious Minds (2010)
- El cartel 2 - La guerra total (TV Series) (2010)
- La Casa de al Lado (TV Series) (2011)
- RPM Miami (TV Series) (2011)
- Grachi (TV Series) (2012)
- Adios Carmen (2013)
- Reina de corazones (TV series) (2014)
- Demente Criminal (TV Series) (2015)
- Dueños del paraíso (TV Series) (2015)
- La Embajada (TV Series) (2016)
- The Purge TV (TV Series) (2018)
- Desaparecidos (TV series) (2020)
- The Mallorca Files (TV series) (2021) as Pia Rey episode 2-6 "The Outlaw Jose Rey"
- Panhandle (TV series) (2022)
- Desperation Road (2022)
- Galgos (TV series) (2023)
- The Blacklist (TV series) (2023)
- Stags (TV series) (2023)

== Awards ==
Arts and Entertainment Critics Awards, Chile

2004 Nominated APES Award Best Actress (Mejor actriz) Sub terra (2003)

Biarritz International Festival of Latin American Cinema

2003 Won Best Actress Sub terra (2003)

Goya Awards

1998 Nominated Goya Best New Actress (Mejor Actriz Revelación) Retrato de mujer con hombre al fondo (1997)

Lleida Latin-American Film Festival

2004 Won Best Actress Sub terra (2003)
