= Valentine Pelka =

English actor (born 1956)

- Born: 23 February 1956 (age 70); Dewsbury, West Riding of Yorkshire, England
- Occupation: Actor
- Years active: 1983–present

Valentine Pelka (born 23 February 1956) is an English actor who is renowned for his versatile range of roles in film, television and theatre productions.

== Early life ==
Pelka was born in Dewsbury, West Riding of Yorkshire, to a Polish engineer father (Tadeusz Pelka) and an Irish actress (Alma Herley). He is the nephew of actor Randal Herley, and his maternal grandparents were WWI veteran and ophthalmologist Randal Herley and Irish singer Annie (née Mahon) Herley. He attended St Michael's College, Leeds (now part of Mount St Mary's Catholic High School, Leeds). His sister, Kazia, is also an actress, who starred in Brookside, Heartbeat and The Bill, among other television programmes.

== Career ==
Pelka studied English at university, where he developed an interest in drama through extracurricular involvement in various university stage productions, before subsequently training at the London Academy of Music and Dramatic Art (LAMDA), where he honed skills in stage combat and horse riding, which later came in useful in his frequent portrayals of historical and action-orientated characters. Pelka began his career as a professional actor in 1983 on stage with the Oedipus Trilogy as a member of the chorus. Later the same year he appeared as Curio in Twelfth Night and Scarus in Anthony and Cleopatra. He continued to play a number supporting roles including the poet Percy Bysshe Shelley in the touring production of Bloody Poetry,. By the late 1980's he took on lead roles including Nechaev in Dead Men Roman in Winter in the Morning and Samuel Gerridge in Caste respectively.

In 1984, he transferred to television, his early screen roles were mainly historical characters including Boguslaw Banas in Pope John Paul II, Efrem Sakharov in Sakharov and Shammah in King David (1985). He gained further prominence in the recurring role as the rebel leader Roland in the first series Crossbow (UK, William Tell) in 1987. Pelka has featured in a number of supporting roles in various television series including Lytton's Diary, Robin of Sherwood, If Tomorrow Comes, Rockliffe's Folly, Boon, Campion, The Bill, Peak Practice, Ivanhoe, Life Force, Prime Suspect, Hustle and Ultimate Force. In 1995, he appeared with his sister in an episode of Heartbeat where he played Danny, a pirate radio D.J. in the episode "Sitting Off on the Dock of the Bay".

Despite his television and film work taking precedence by the 1990's, on stage he featured in a succession of acclaimed performances, include a stint with the Royal Shakespeare Company between 1992-93 where he appeared in Romeo and Juliet, A Women Killed with Kindness and the title role in Hamlet.

He guest-starred in the 1990 TV series Zorro in the episode "All that Glitters" which preceded his starring role as the military governor, Colonel Montoya, in the 2000 syndicated TV series Queen of Swords, the part of Montoya was written for Pelka by executive producer David Abramowitz who in October 1999 offered him the part subject to approval by the other show producers. Between 1996-98, Pelka appeared in Highlander: The Series as Kronos, an enemy of Duncan MacLeod (Adrian Paul) and former acolyte of Methos (Peter Wingfield) in the episodes "Comes a Horseman", "Revelations 6:8", "Archangel" and "Not To Be". In 1999 he appeared in the sequel series, in a guest starring role in Highlander: The Raven as Andre Korda, an immortal who is a criminal and once trained the main character Amanda. The episodes were 'The French Connection' and 'A Matter of Time'.

The same year, Pelka appeared in the British TV soap opera Family Affairs as Simon Thornton. His sister, Kazia, was also a leading player in Family Affairs; however, that was after he had appeared in the soap opera. Of the feature films in which Pelka has performed, the best-known was Roman Polanski's 2002 film The Pianist. His supporting comedic role in Under the Tuscan Sun (2003) was performed mute. In 2004, he appeared at the Edinburgh Fringe Festival as John Lennon in Sandy Marshall's biopic And in the End, which he later reprised in 2013 at the Jeremy Street Theatre in London.

== Selected Filmography ==
Year	Title	Role	Notes
1984	Pope John Paul II	Boguslaw Banas	TV movie
1984	Sakharov	Efrem Sakharov	Film
1985	King David	Shammah	Film
1986	Lytton's Diary	Gerry	Episode: "The Ancien Regime"
1986	If Tomorrow Comes	Gino	Episode #1.2
1986	Nanou	Jacques	Film
1986	Robin of Sherwood	Sarak	Episode: "The Sheriff of Nottingham"
1987	Crossbow	Roland	6 episodes
1987	Hold the Dream	Winston Harte	Episode #1.1
1987	Pulaski	Shadwell	Episode: "The Fictional Detective"
1988	Rockliffe's Folly	Mr. Cunningham	Episode: "Lie of the Land"
1988	Rowing with the Wind	Percy Bysshe Shelley	Film
1989	Boon	Charlie Cochrane	Episode: "Love Letters from a Dead Man"
1990	Campion	Eager-Wright	Episode: "Sweet Danger" (2 parts)
1990	Casualty	Stuart	Episode: "Salvation"
1990	South of the Border	Dr. Manci	Episode #2.3
1990	Zorro	Leonardo Montez	Episode: "All That Glitters"
1991	The Bill	Graham Woodward	Episode: "In Chambers"
1994	Peak Practice	Michael Massey	Episode: "Power Games"
1995	First Knight	Sir Patrise	Film
1995	Heartbeat	Danny	Episode: "Sitting Off on the Dock of the Bay"
1995	The Plant	Max	TV movie
1996	Cadfael	Richard Boterel	Episode: "The Virgin in the Ice"
1996 - 1998	Highlander: The Series	Kronos; Ahriman; Koren	5 episodes
1997	Ivanhoe	Maurice De Bracy	4 episodes
1998	Mortimer's Law	John Keswick	3 episodes
1998	What Rats Won't Do	Graham	Film
1999	Bugs	Vaizey	Episode: "Twin Geeks"
1999	Family Affairs	Simon Thornton	250 episodes
1999	Highlander: The Raven	Andre Korda	2 episodes
2000	The Last of the Blonde Bombshells	Leslie	TV movie
2000	Life Force	Richard Webber	2 episodes
2000	Sabotage!	Prussian hussar	Film
2000 - 2001	Queen of Swords	Col. Luis Montoya	21 episodes
2002	The Pianist	Dorota's Husband	Film
2003	Prime Suspect	SO19 Commander	Episode: "The Last Witness" (Part 2)
2003	Under the Tuscan Sun	Jerzy	Film
2004	Hustle	Antique Shop Owner	Episode: "Picture Perfect"
2004	Lie With Me	Alex	Film
2005	8mm 2	Gorman Bellec	Film
2005	Egypt	Pierre Lacau	2 episodes
2006	Ultimate Force	Colonel Bundarchuk	Episode: "The Changing of the Guard"
2008	Fake Identity	Matthew Murdoch	Film
2010	A Touch of Frost	Sam Crague	Episode: "If Dogs Run Free" (Part 2)
2010	Doctors	Laurence Metcalfe	Episode: "Risky Business"
2011	Come Fly With Me	Polish Ambassador Dubrovsky	Episode #1.6
2013	I Spit on Your Grave 2	Father Dimov	Film
2015	Churchill: When Britain Said No	Alanbrooke	TV movie
2015	The Power	Del	Film
2018	Macbeth	Siward	Film
