= Alwyn Kumst =

Alwyn Kumst CSC is a South Africa-born Canadian cinematographer. He is most noted for his work on the 1999 film The Divine Ryans, for which he was a Genie Award nominee for Best Cinematography at the 20th Genie Awards in 2000.

His other credits have included the film Cold Blooded, the television films The Summit and Harriet the Spy: Blog Wars, and episodes of the television series Mysterious Island, The Adventures of Sinbad, Queen of Swords, Relic Hunter, Falcon Beach, Degrassi: The Next Generation, Rookie Blue and Suits.
