= Anthony Lemke =

Canadian actor (born 1970)

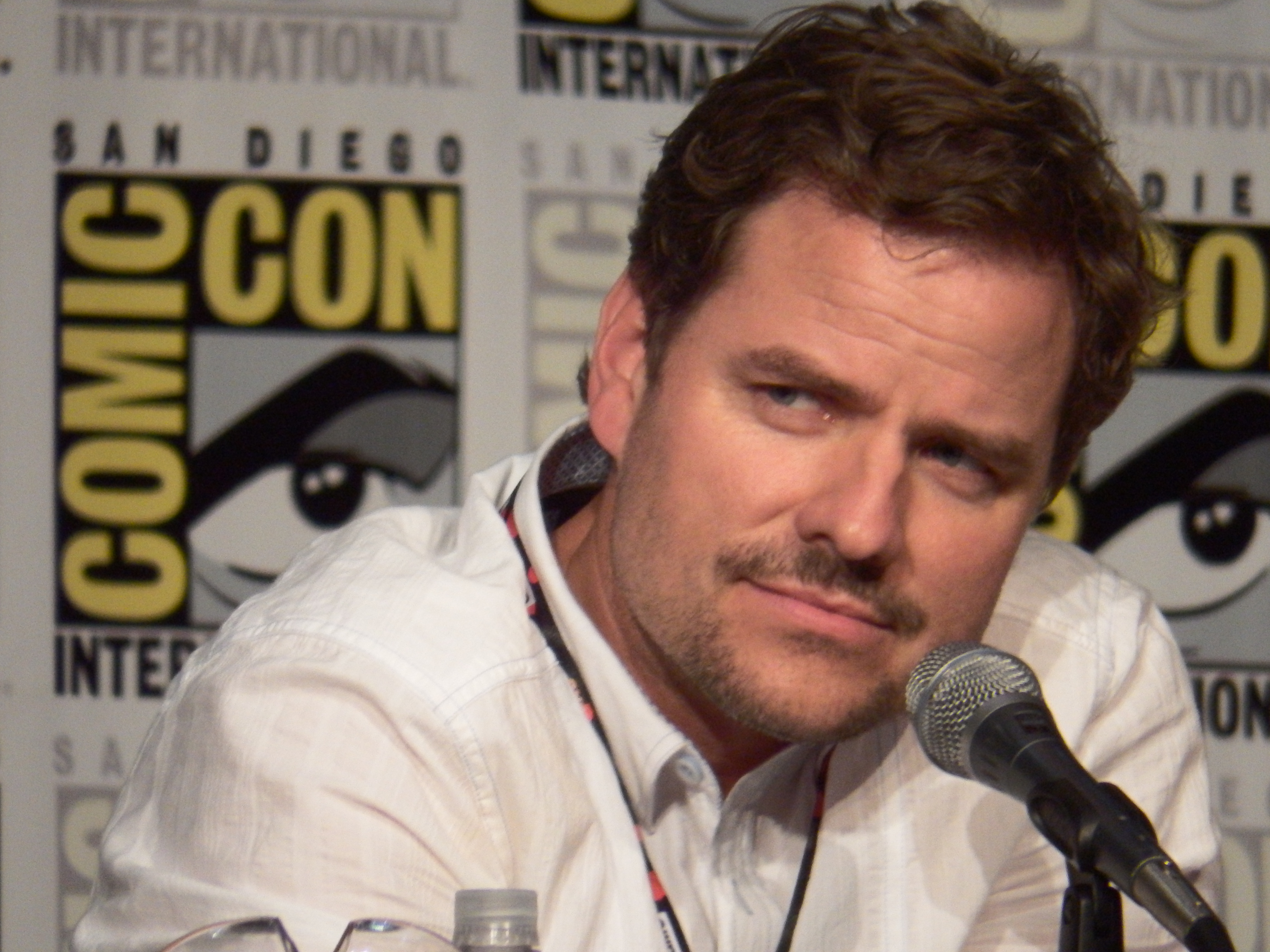
- Lemke in 2016
- Born: Roger Anthony Lemke; October 7, 1970 (age 55); Ottawa, Ontario, Canada
- Education: McGill University; University of Waterloo
- Occupation: Actor
- Years active: 1997–present
- Television: Syfy's Dark Matter (TV Series)
- Spouse: Maria Gacesa (m. 2001)
- Children: 3

Roger Anthony Lemke (born October 7, 1970) is a Canadian television and film actor, best known for portraying Three (Marcus Boone / Titch) on the science-fiction drama Dark Matter. In French Canada, Lemke is best known for playing David Rothstein on the comedy-drama Les Hauts et les bas de Sophie Paquin.

== Early life and education ==
Anthony Lemke was born in Ottawa, Ontario. He is the child of immigrants, his parents having arrived from the Netherlands and East Prussia in the early 1960s. Lemke attended elementary and high school in French under the immersion programs at Knoxdale Public School, Greenbank Middle School, and Sir Robert Borden High School in Nepean.

Upon graduation, Lemke moved to Waterloo, Ontario to study theatre at the University of Waterloo. Lemke also holds degrees in both common law and civil law, having graduated from the McGill University Faculty of Law with Distinction.

== Career ==
Lemke landed his first professional role in a production of the play Nurse Jane Goes to Hawaii by the Canadian playwright Allan Stratton at what is now the King's Wharf Theatre. His first role in a TV series followed shortly thereafter when he was cast in La Femme Nikita. He got the role largely because he could speak Czech from the year he spent teaching English in the Czech Republic.

In 2000 Lemke landed the role of the mustachio-twirling mercenary Captain Grisham on the fantasy-genre series The Queen of Swords, which Variety Magazine declared a "guilty pleasure". He also played James Murphy, the son of Alex Murphy (a.k.a. RoboCop), in RoboCop: Prime Directives, a four-part mini-series that aired in 2001.

In 2003 Lemke enrolled in law school at the McGill University in Montreal, during which time he continued to act, including regular roles on the Montreal-shot series 15/Love (season 3) and CBC Television's Rumours. He also portrayed Rob Smith in A Life Interrupted, which was nominated for the Best TV Movie at the 2008 Gemini Awards.

Since returning full-time to acting after law school, Lemke has a deep collection of credits to his name in both English and French. In 2008 he joined the cast of Radio Canada's comedy-drama Les Hauts et les bas de Sophie Paquin, playing David Rothstein, a character that Montreal newspaper La Presse numbers among the few anglophone characters to ever "mark the soul" of Quebecers. He followed up in French with recurring roles on Mémoires Vives, Mirador, Nouvelle Adresse, all of which are Gémeaux Award nominated TV series.

In 2011, he joined the casts of Lost Girl and Montreal-shot Blue Mountain State for multiple-episode arcs. The same year, Lemke took on the part of Le Vulgaire in the bi-lingual film Rouge Sang; the film garnered 3 Canadian Screen Award nominations.

In 2014, Lemke reprised his role of Brian Becker for the fifth season of CTV and Fox International's The Listener, a role he had played during season 1. Lemke also began a 7-episode run over two seasons on Bravo's police drama 19-2 as SQ Officer Dan Malloy. The series received 10 Canadian Screen Award nominations, including best dramatic series. Also in 2014, Lemke was cast in the role of "Three" (a.k.a. Marcus Boone) in the science fiction television series Dark Matter. The series shot 39 episodes over three seasons from 2015 to 2017. Lemke appeared in all 39 episodes.

== Personal life ==
Lemke married classical musician Maria Gacesa in 2001, when the couple were living in Toronto. They have lived most of their lives since in Montreal, where the couple's three children were born. From 2014 to 2018, Lemke and his family lived in Prince Edward County, Ontario.

== Filmography ==
=== Film ===
Year	Title	Role	Notes
1997	Shake, Rattle and Roll	Sandra Phalor	Short film
2000	American Psycho	Marcus Halberstram	
2002	Time of the Wolf	Alex McKenzie	
2002	Rub & Tug	Henry	
2003	TrueSexLies	Cal	Short film
2003	The Pedestrian	Bruce	
2003	Rhinoceros Eyes	Movie Actor / Dick	
2006	Legacy of Fear	Jack Cobell	
2009	Dead like Me: Life After Death	Firefighter	Direct-to-DVD
2010	One Last Dance	Josh	Short film Also: Writer, Producer
2011	Coteau Rouge	Jason Singleton	French-language film
2011	Faces in the Crowd	Bryce #3	
2011	Down the Road Again	Matt Burns	
2013	Rouge Sang	Le vulgaire	in French and English
2013	White House Down	Captain Hutton	
2014	Real Lies	Coinjoint de Rachel	French-language film; also known as Le vrai du faux
2015	The Forbidden Room	Bud	
2015	Sleepless	Greg Shaw	Short film
2021	Woman in Car	David	

=== Television ===
Year	Title	Role	Notes
1997	La Femme Nikita	Guard	Episode: "Gray"
1997	Fast Track	Willy Voss	Episode: "The Race Fan"
1999	Too Rich: The Secret Life of Doris Duke	Walker Inman	Television miniseries
1999	Psi Factor: Chronicles of the Paranormal	Marc Hagan	3 episodes
1999	Ricky Nelson: Original Teen Idol	David Nelson	Television movie; also known as The Ricky Nelson Story
2000	Twice in a Lifetime	Young Dr. Hugh Janyk	Episode: "Old Flames"
2000	Relic Hunter	Brad	Episode: "Affaire de Coeur"
2000	D.C.	Legislative Director Robert	Episode: Pilot
2000	The Famous Jett Jackson	Marco	Episode: "Step Up"
2000	Queen of Swords	Captain Marcus Grisham	Main role, 22 episodes
2001	Earth Angels		Television movie
2001	RoboCop: Prime Directives	OCP Executive James Murphy	Television miniseries; main role
2001	Witchblade	Isaac Sullivan	Episode: "Diplopia"
2001	Andromeda	Leydon Bryce-Hawkins	Episode: "A Heart for Falsehood Framed"
2001	Mutant X	Charles Marlowe	Episode: "Meaning of Death"
2001	Earth: Final Conflict	Gren	Episode: "Entombed"
2002	Haven't We Met Before?	Detective Jack Cobel	Television movie
2002	Tom Stone	Luis Arramendia	Episode: "The Last Go Round"
2003	Do or Die	Jack Hennessey	Television movie
2003	Doc	Richard Black	3 episodes
2004	A Deadly Encounter	Tony Brock	Television movie; also known as Over the Edge
2004	False Pretenses	Randal Ackers	Television movie
2006	Proof of Lies	Chuck Hartley	Television movie
2006	15/Love	Coach Daniel Brock	Main role (season 3), 14 episodes
2006	Legacy of Fear	Jack Cobell	Television movie
2006	Rumours	Charles Jefferson	Recurring role, 7 episodes
2007	A Life Interrupted	Rob Smith	Television movie
2007	Wide Awake	Robert Turner	Television movie
2007	Heartland	Carl	Episode: "One Trick Pony"
2008–09	Les Hauts et les bas de Sophie Paquin	David Rothstein	Recurring role, 16 episodes; French-language TV series
2009	The Last Templar	Clive Edmonston	Television miniseries
2009	Reverse Angle	Harry Griggs	Television movie
2009	The Phantom	Detective Clark Ellis	Television miniseries
2009	Murdoch Mysteries	Henry Bixby	Episode: "Shades of Gray"
2009	The Listener	Brian Becker	Recurring role (season 1); main role (season 5); 22 episodes
2010	The Cutting Edge: Fire & Ice	James Agent	Television movie
2010	You Lucky Dog	Don Lally	Television movie
2010	Dead Lines	Adam Fyne	Television movie
2010	30 Vies	Marc Turpin	French-language TV series
2011	XIII: The Series	Markle	Episode: "Costa Verde"
2011	Warehouse 13	Michael Martin	Episode: "Queen for a Day"
2011	Who Is Simon Miller?	Jeffrey	Television movie
2011	Flashpoint	Tim Engels	Episode: "Wild Card"
2011	Mirador	Peter ami de Véro	4 episodes; French-language TV series
2011	Blue Mountain State	Coach Marcus Gilday	Recurring role, 6 episodes
2011	Lost Girl	Ryan Lambert	Recurring role, 5 episodes
2012	Trauma	Plasticien de Stella	Episode: "Humains et machines"; French-language TV series
2013	Exploding Sun	Craig Bakus	Television movie
2013	Still Life: A Three Pines Mystery	Inspector Jean-Guy Beauvoir	Television movie
2013	Witches of East End	Harrison Welles	3 episodes
2013	Mémoires vives	Richard	5 episodes; French-language TV series
2014	Nouvelle adresse	Tom Severson	3 episodes; French-language TV series
2014	Bomb Girls: Facing the Enemy	Philip Davis	Television movie
2014	Murdoch Mysteries	Father Clements	Episodes: "Glory Days", "Holy Matrimony, Murdoch!"
2014	19-2	Dan Malloy - SQ	Recurring role, 7 episodes
2015	Good Witch	Ryan Elliott	Main role (season 1), 11 episodes
2015	Dark Matter	Three / Marcus Boone	Main role (all seasons), 39 episodes
2017	Private Eyes	Jack Sugar	Episode: "Boardwalk Empire"
2018	Blindspot	Victor	Recurring role, 3 episodes
2018	Frankie Drake Mysteries	Detective Grayson	Main role (season 2), 10 episodes
2019	Cerebrum	Lieutenant Robert Hillman	Recurring role, 5 episodes
2021	Toute La Vie	Herman Dubois	Recurring role, 3 episodes
2022-2023	The Hardy Boys	Fenton Hardy	Main role
2023	Wong & Winchester	Martin Simard	Main role

=== Video games ===
Year	Title	Role	Notes
2014	Watch Dogs: Bad Blood	Additional voices	
2014	Assassin's Creed: Unity	Pierre Bellec / 'Murder Foretold' Vineyard Worker	
