= Tessie Santiago =

American actress

- Born: Tessie Marie Santiago; August 10, 1975 (age 51); Miami, Florida, United States
- Occupation: Actress
- Years active: 1999–present
- Spouse: Carlos Bernard (m. 2013)
- Children: 1

Tessie Marie Santiago (born August 10, 1975 in Miami, Florida) is an American actress of Cuban and Spanish descent.

== Biography ==
=== Family and education ===
Tessie Santiago is a first generation American. Her parents and grandparents fled from Cuba after Fidel Castro took power in 1959. Her grandfather was a sculptor. Santiago's father, Joe Santiago, was a musician and her mother's mother was described as a painter. (Santiago's mother, Tess Stebbins, went on to earn a college degree from Barry University as a working adult in Florida and is Executive Director of Medical Education at the University of Miami Miller School of Medicine.) Santiago learned to play the piano at age seven.

Santiago has two younger siblings, a brother and a half-sister. She attended Miami Coral Park High School graduating class of 1993.

A May 1999 graduate from the University of Miami, she earned a double major in film and theater arts and was able to study Shakespeare in London, England and Film Production with the Film and TV School of the Academy of Performing Arts in Prague (FAMU) in Prague, Czech Republic. At university, she starred in the independent film Echo and acted in several other student films.

While working in Spain on the Queen of Swords, Santiago rescued and adopted a dog she named Zion.

Santiago's favourite authors include Henry Miller, Anaïs Nin and Milan Kundera. She has reported aspiration to work behind the camera, both as a writer and a director.

Santiago married actor Carlos Bernard in December 2013. They have a son, Jax, born in August 2018.

=== Career ===
Santiago made her television debut in 2000 in the syndicated action/adventure television series Queen of Swords, playing Tessa Alvarado/The Queen. She went on to appear on television shows including the first 11 episodes of the first season of the sitcom Good Morning, Miami, playing Lucia Rojas-Klein; and in episodes of Kitchen Confidential, Curb Your Enthusiasm, and One on One. In 2001, Santiago landed a co-starring role with Annabeth Gish and Kamar de los Reyes in the VH1 TV-movie The Way She Moves, playing Christina Juarez, a Latina dancer with the dream of winning a dance exhibition. Santiago then played Sarah Marshall in the independent film The Way Back Home. In 2009, she starred in the movie The Cell 2, a direct-to-video spin-off of the 2000 film The Cell, playing psychic investigator Maya Casteneda. She was a cast regular on the 2010 TV series Twentysixmiles, playing Jennifer Calderon. She also had a role in the 2010 film Angel Camouflaged playing Desdemona. She guest starred in an episode of the TV series Royal Pains in 2010, reuniting with her former Good Morning, Miami co-star, Mark Feuerstein. She appeared in 3 episodes of the TV series The Secret Life of the American Teenager in 2012.

== Accolades ==
Santiago was nominated for a 2001 ALMA Award for "Outstanding lead actress in a syndicated drama series" for Queen of Swords together with Tia Carrere and the winner Gina Torres.

She was ranked #50 on the Maxim Hot 100 Women of 2001 list.

== Filmography ==
=== Film ===
Year	Title	Role	Notes
2001	The Way She Moves	Christina Juarez	Video Hits One TV Movie
2006	The Way Back Home	Sara Marshall	Independent Movie
2006	Break-In	Joannie	LifeTime TV Movie
2009	The Cell 2	Maya Casteneda	direct-to-video
2010	Angel Camouflaged	Desdemona	
2021	Vivo	Ticket-Taker	Netflix Original film

=== Television ===
Year	Title	Role	Notes
2000–2001	Queen of Swords	Tessa Alvarado/The Queen	22 episodes
2002–2003	Good Morning, Miami	Lucía Rojas-Klein	11 episodes
2004	Curb Your Enthusiasm	Chambermaid	HBO Series
2005–2006	Kitchen Confidential	Donna	5 episodes
2006	One on One	Hannah	
2009	One Hot Summer	Anabel Aguilera	Made-for-TV Movie
2010	Twentysixmiles	Jennifer Calderon	6 episodes
2013	The Secret Life of the American Teenager	Sonya	3 episodes
2015	Major Crimes	Mrs. Riley	
2017	Bizaardvark	Gina Olvera	
2017	Scandal	Vice President Luna Vargas	9 episodes
