= Mar Abad =

Spanish journalist and writer

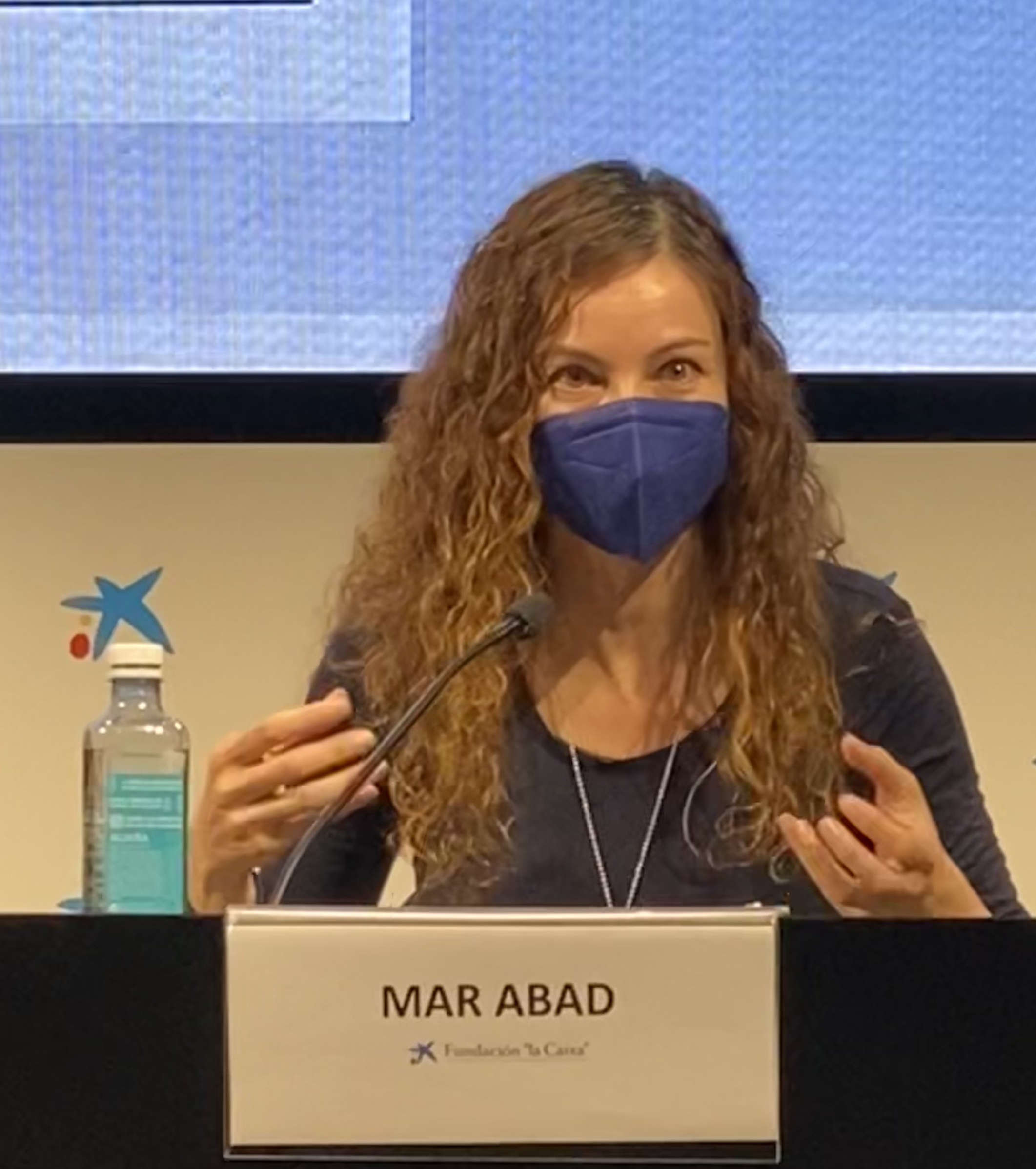
- Born: November 7, 1972 (age 54); Almería, Spain
- Occupations: Journalist, Writer,
- Writing career
- Notable awards: International Journalism Award ‘Colombine’ (2018) Miguel Delibes’ National Journalism Award (2019) Don Quixote Journalism Award (2020)
- Website: marabad.com

Mar Abad (Almería, 7 November 1972) is a Spanish journalist, writer and businesswoman. Between 2012 and 2020, she has received several awards and recognitions from the journalism sector.

== Professional career ==
Abad holds a degree in journalism from the Faculty of Information Sciences of the Complutense University of Madrid (UCM) and a Masters in Business Information from the UCM and the Association of Economic Information Journalists (APIE). She is a member of the Madrid Press Association (APM).

In 2000, she co-founded Zentropy, McCann Erickson's first internet company. In 2006, Abad was part of the founding team of the magazine Brandlife, where she continued to work until 2009. At that time, due to internal problems within the publication, four people left. They started Yorokobu magazine the same year. They had no investors, only savings, so they worked for the first year without being paid.

Abad has worked for Canal Sur Televisión in Almería, the newspaper La Voz de Almería, the EFE agency in Madrid, CNN in Atlanta (United States), the magazine Anuncios (Madrid), the magazine Brandlife (Madrid) and the television channel Telecinco. She has also worked for the business daily Cinco Días, Esquire magazine, Los 40 radio, the magazine Interactiva y Estrategias and Antena 3 TV's TecnoXplora technology channel.

She has taught at the Istituto Europeo di Design, the Foxize School, the University of Santander and the Pompeu Fabra University, among others. She has been deputy editor of the magazine Ling, of the publishing house Brands & Roses, and editor of the Yorokobumasthead.

Mar Abad has written for the programme El condensador de fluzo on RTVE and founded the podcast production company El Extraordinario, where she is the scrip-writer and editorial director. She also contributes to the podcast Las Palabras, on Radio Prisa, for the teaching of the Spanish language.

In 2022 Abad published Romanones. Una zarzuela del poder en 37 actos (Romanones. A zarzuela of power in 37 acts), dramatized biography of the Count of Romanones. The journalist Cristóbal Villalobos described it as 'agile and entertaining'.

== Recognised and awarded ==
In 2012, Abad was named 'TweetPeriodista' in the Tweet Awards 2012. She was also a finalist in the Accenture Journalism Awards 2012 for "La comunicación cuántica (Quantum communication)". In 2014 she was named 'Influencer 2.0' at Madrid Woman's Week. In the same year she was a finalist in La Buena Prensa Awards in the reporting category for "La máquina de escribir: de los evangelistas a los tipógrafos (The typewriter: from evangelists to typesetters)". In 2016 she was a finalist for the Colombine International Journalism Award for "Ángela Ruiz Robles: la española que vislumbró la era digital en los años 40 (Ángela Ruiz Robles: the Spaniard who glimpsed the digital age in the 1940s)". In 2016 "El folletín ilustrado" of Yorokobu, a character story written by Abad and drawn by Buba Viedma, received a silver medal at the ÑH Awards in 2016.

In 2017, she won the Accenture Journalism Award in the Innovation category for "Dos veinteañeros están creando una nueva industria aeroespacial (Two twenties are creating a new aerospace industry)".

The following year her report "Las mujeres aún tienen que conquistar las ciudades (Women have yet to conquer cities", won the Colombine International Journalism Award and the journalist was a finalist with Aurora Bertrana: lecciones de una rebelde para ser una mujer libre. (Aurora Bertrana: lessons from a rebel to be a free woman).

In 2019, she was awarded the Miguel Delibes National Journalism Prize for "El lenguaje impaciente (The Impatient language)".

She was again finalist at Colombine International Journalism Prize with "Violeta, la periodista que impulsó la liberación de la mujer a principios del XX (Violet, the journalist who pushed for women's liberation in the early 20th century)". Mar Abad was also finalist in La Buena Prensa Awards 2019, in the interview category, for "Rocío Sáiz: El Chonismo ilustrado reivindica el folclore nacional (Rocío Sàiz: Illustrated Chonism vindicates national folklore)".

In 2020, Abad won the Don Quijote Journalism Award for "Cómo ha cambiado el español en los últimos 80 años (How Spanish has changed in the last 80 years)".

== Published work ==
- 2011 - Twittergrafía, el arte de la nueva escritura. Catarata. Co-author with Mario Tascón. ISBN 978-84-8319-625-0
- 2017 - De estraperlo a #postureo. Editorial Larousse. ISBN 978-8499742663
- 2019 - Ancient but modern. Libros del K.O. ISBN 978-84-17678-24-1
- 2019 - El folletín ilustrado. Lunwerg Publishers. Co-author with Buba Viedma. ISBN 978-84-17858-24-7
- 2022 - Romanones. A zarzuela of power in 37 acts. Libros del K.O. ISBN 978-84-19119-10-0
