= La Voz de Almería =

Daily newspaper in Spain

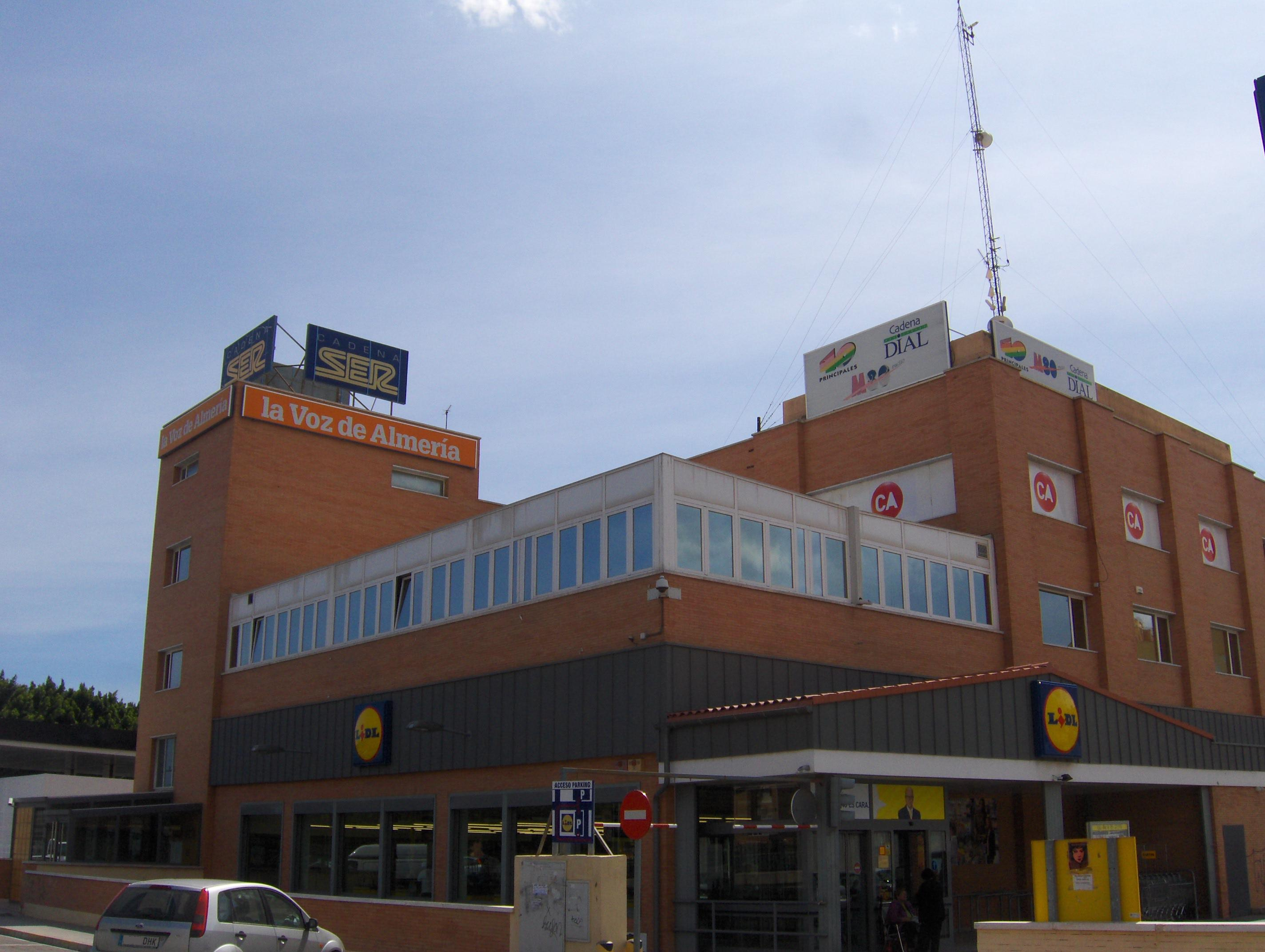
- Headquarters in Almería
- Type: Daily newspaper
- Format: Broadsheet
- Owner: Novotécnica
- Founded: 1939
- Language: Spanish language
- City: Almería
- Country: Spain
- ISSN: 1576-5296
- OCLC number: 1322195612
- Website: lavozdealmeria.es

La Voz de Almería is a local daily newspaper published in Almería, Spain. It has been in circulation since 1939. It is one of the leading papers of the region.

== History and profile ==
La Voz de Almería was established in 1939 as Yugo, but its title was changed in 1962 after the beginning of the Francoist regime. The paper is headquartered in Almería. The publisher of the daily is Comercialización de Medios CM2000, S.A.

In the late 1990s La Voz de Almería was read by both socialists and those with a right-wing political stance.

On 20 July 2026 Alfredo Casas López was named director of the newspaper, succeeding Pedro Manuel de la Cruz.

== Editors and contributors ==
La Voz de Almería has been edited by José María Bugella, José Cirre Jiménez, Eduardo Molina Fajardo and Donato León Tierno. Its major contributors include Manuel del Águila, Eduardo del Pino Vicente or José Ángel Tapia Garrido.

== Bibliography ==
- Blanco Martín, Miguel Ángel (2015). Cultura, periodismo y transición democrática en Almería (1973-1986) (in Spanish). Almeria: Universidad de Almería. p. 1034. ISBN 9788416027729.
- Rodríguez Barreira, Guillermo Óscar J. (2007). Poder y actitudes sociales durante la postguerra en Almería (1939-1953) (in Spanish). Almeria: Universidad de Almería. p. 1466. ISBN 9788482408460.
