= Francisco Losada =

Spanish composer and conductor

Francisco Losada, sometimes called Francisco de Losada (c. 1612 – 1667) was a Spanish baroque composer and music conductor. There are no documents concerning the time and location of Losada's birth. It is presumed that he was born in Almería in 1612 (or between 1612 and 1615). He joined the Order of Saint Jerome. From 8 May 1637, Losada was employed by Almería Cathedral as a conductor, the position being vacant since the departure of Antonio de Paz in October 1636. Additionally, his responsibilities included composing pieces of music for important events, as well as teaching organ, singing, and harmony. In 1638, Losada left Almería and moved to Cádiz; his successor was Sebastián de Guevara.

He returned to Almería for the second time in August 1655 and stayed until September 1656, when he went to Cádiz, where he was offered the position of director of a choir. He remained in Cádiz until his death in 1667.

Until the end of the 20th century, Losada was forgotten, and his music was not performed.
