= Almería =

- Municipality
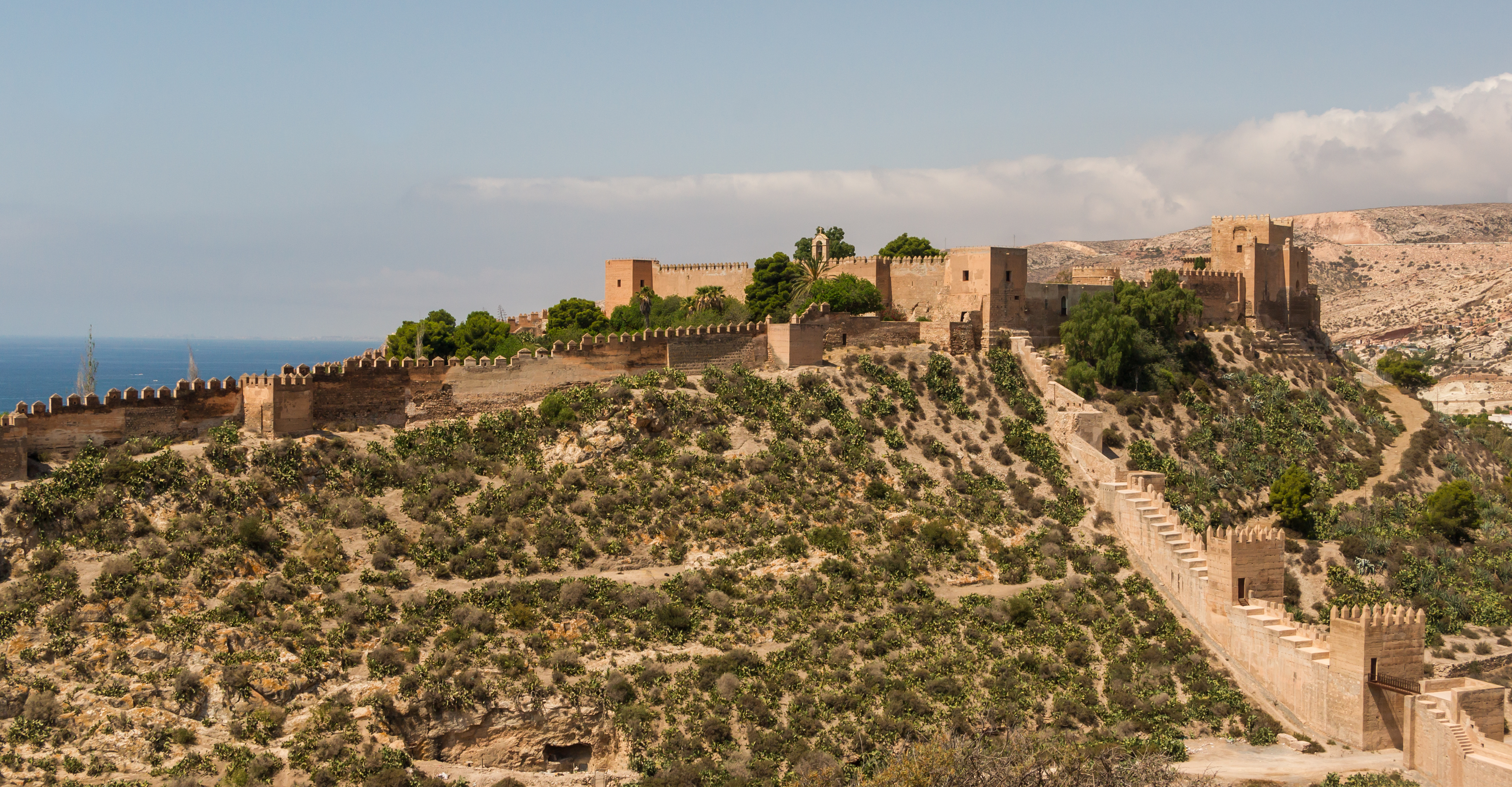
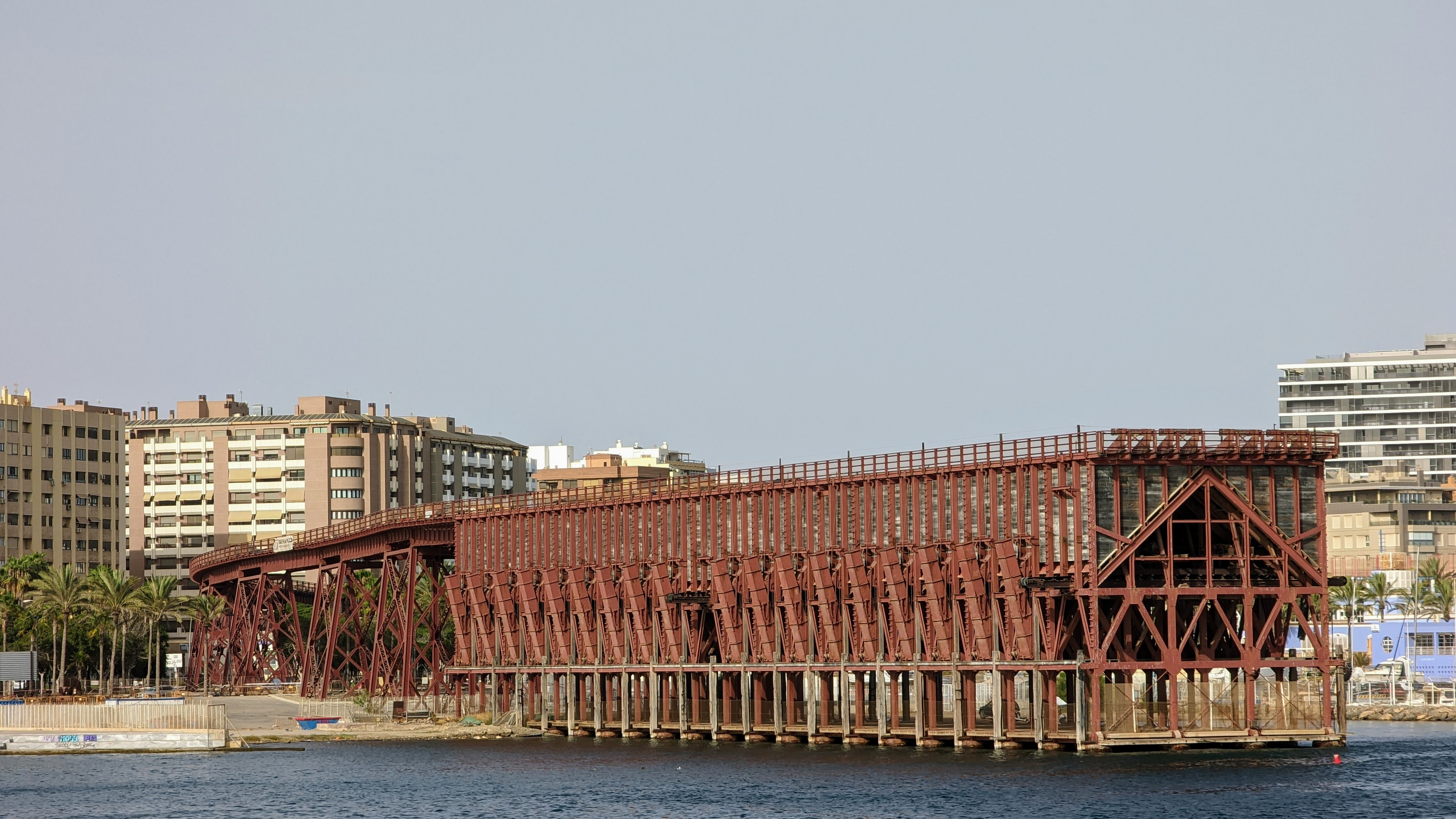
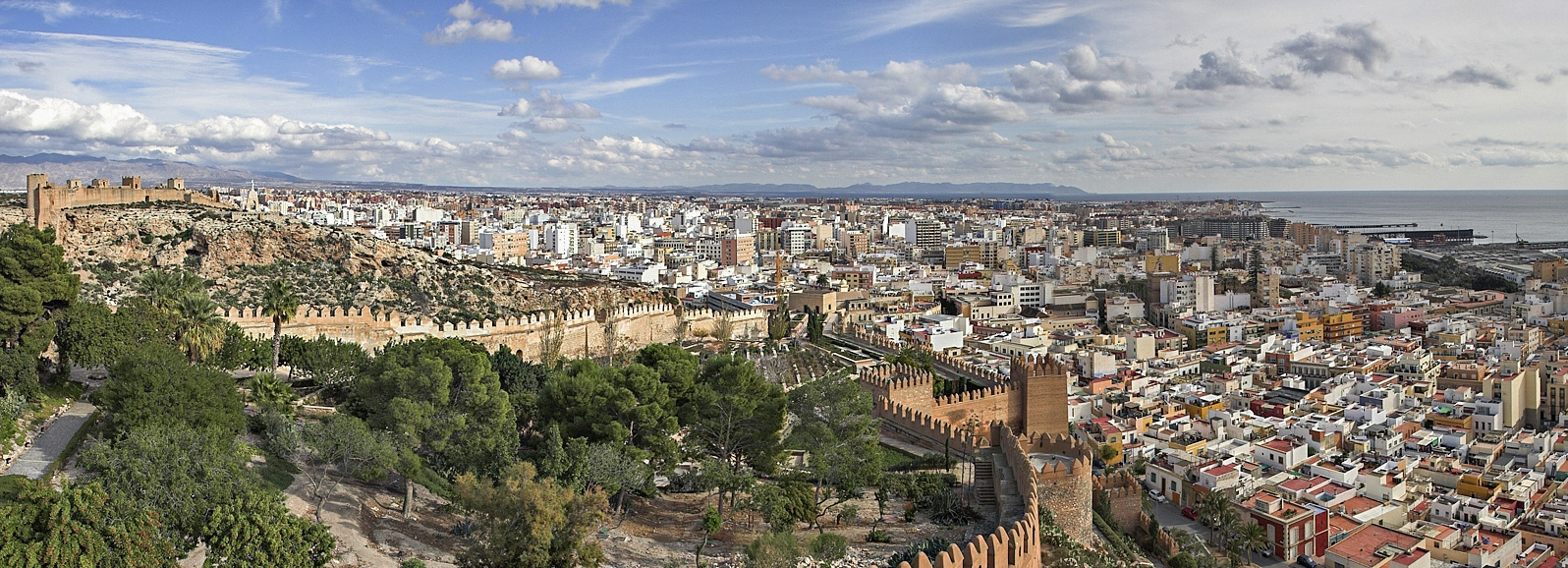
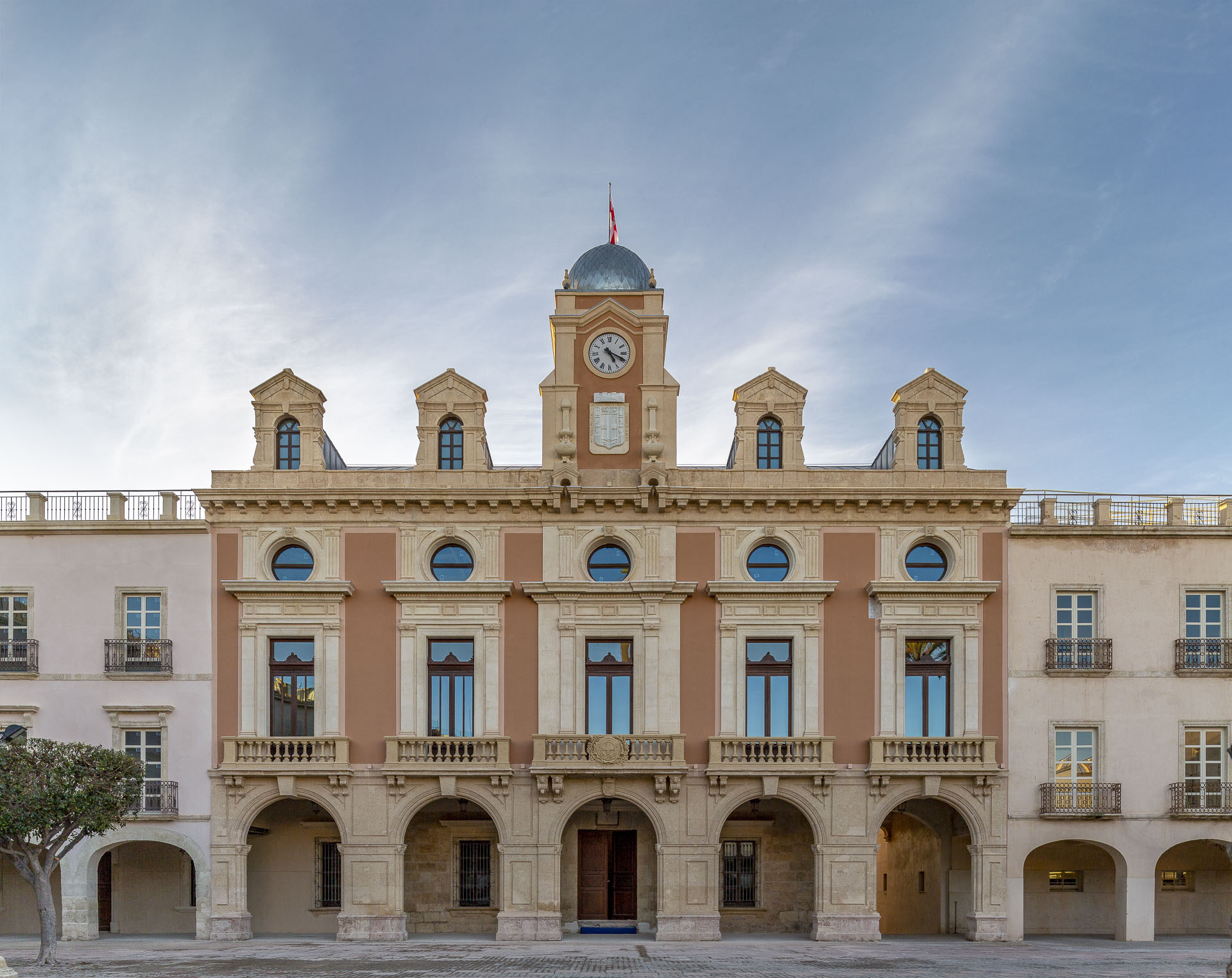
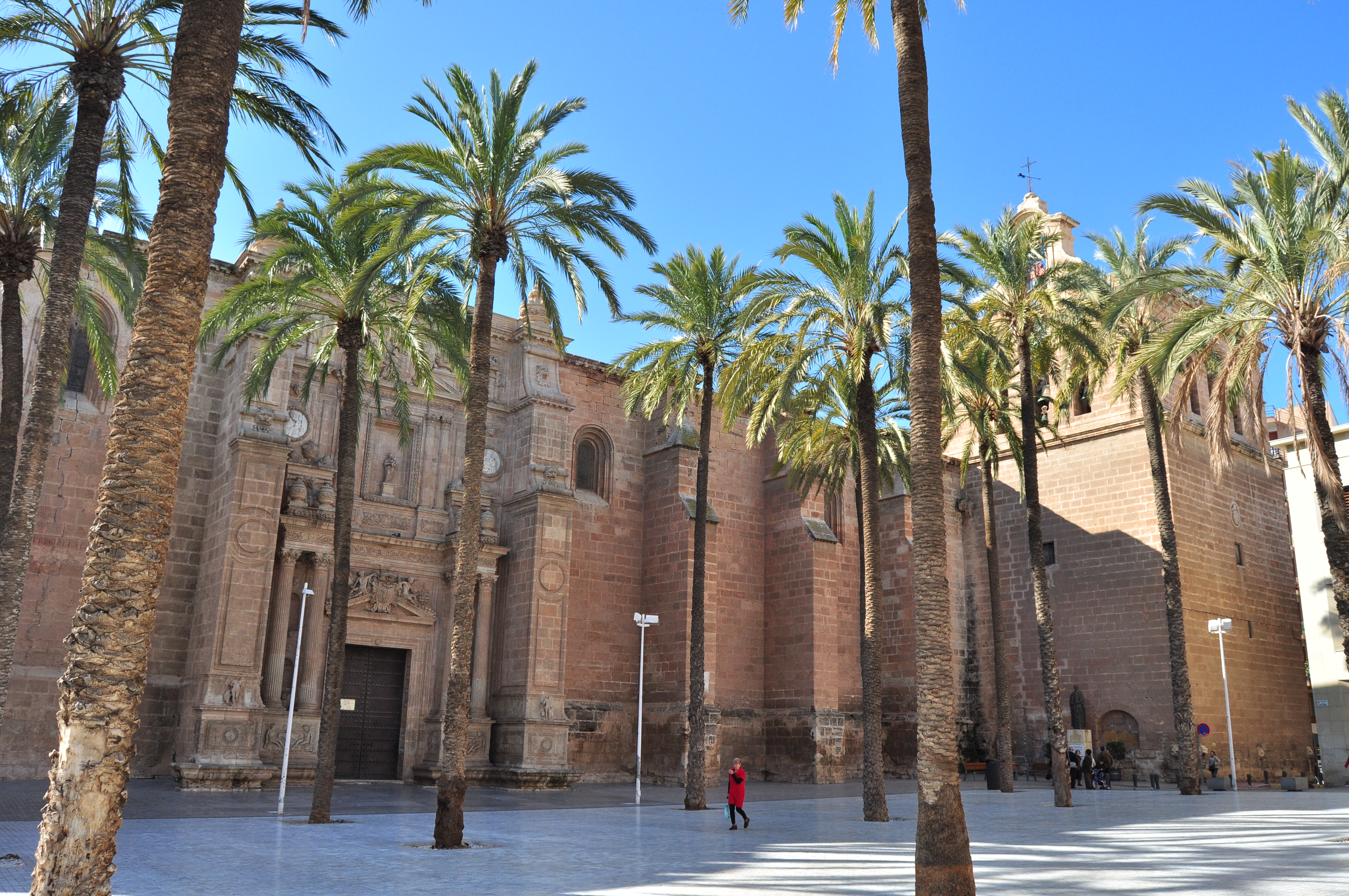
- Alcazaba Cable Inglés Panoramic view City Hall Cathedral

- Flag Coat of arms
- Motto: "Muy noble, muy leal y decidida por la libertad: ciudad de Almería" (Very noble, very loyal and determined towards freedom: city of Almería)
- Interactive map of Almería
- Location within Province of Almería Location within Andalusia Location within Spain
- Coordinates: 36°50′30″N 2°27′50″W
- Country: Spain
- Region: Andalusia
- Province: Almería
- Founded: 955
- Founder: Abd-ar-Rahman III

Government
  - Type: Ayuntamiento
  - Body: Ayuntamiento de Almería
  - Mayor: Ramón Fernández Pacheco (PP)

Area
  - Total: 296 km^{2} (114 sq mi)
- Elevation: 24 m (79 ft)
- Highest elevation (Pico Colativí): 1,387 m (4,551 ft)
- Lowest elevation (Mediterranean Sea): 0 m (0 ft)

Population (2024)
  - Total: 201,946
  - Density: 682/km^{2} (1,770/sq mi)
- Demonyms: Almerienses, urcitanos
- Time zone: UTC+1 (CET)
  - Summer (DST): UTC+2 (CEST)
- Postal code: 04001-04090
- Area code: (+34) 950
- Website: http://www.aytoalmeria.es (in Spanish)

Almería (UK: /ˌælməˈriːə/, US also /ˌɑːl-/; Spanish: [almeˈɾi.a]) is a city and municipality of Spain, located in Andalusia. It is the capital of the province of the same name. The city lies in southeastern Iberia, extending primarily in between the eastern fringes of the Sierra de Gádor and the Andarax riverbed along the coastline of the Gulf of Almería, a large inlet of the Mediterranean Sea. The municipality has a population of 201,946.

Caliph Abd al-Rahman III founded the city in 955. The city grew wealthy during the Islamic era, becoming a world city throughout the 11th and 12th centuries. It enjoyed an active port that traded silk, oil, and raisins. This period was brought to an end with the 1147 conquest of the city by a Christian coalition. Control over Almería switched hands over the rest of the middle ages. In the early modern period, with the onset of Barbary piracy, the ethnic cleansing of moriscos in the Kingdom of Granada, and several natural calamities, urban decay accrued. The 19th-century reactivation of mining activity (lead) in the hinterland fostered commercial activity and demographic growth.

Key road routes include the A-7 connecting Almería to the rest of the Spanish Mediterranean coast and the A-92 connecting the city to Granada and inner Andalusia. Almería is served by a medium-sized airport and a port with a growing specialization in passenger and ro-ro transport with the North of Africa (Algeria and Morocco).

Being adjacent to a small desert, Almería has an exceptionally dry climate by European standards.

== Etymology ==
The name "Almería" comes from the city's former Arabic name, مدينة المرية : Madīnat al-Mariyya, meaning "city of the watchtower". As the settlement was originally the port or coastal suburb of Pechina, it was initially known as مريّة البجّانة : Mariyyat al-Bajjāna (Bajjāna being the Arabic name for Pechina).

== History ==
The origin of Almería is connected to the 9th-century establishment of the so-called Republic of Pechina (Bajjana) some kilometres to the north, which was for a time autonomous from the Cordobese central authority: the settlement of current-day Almería initially developed as a humble trading port of Pechina known as Al-Mariyya Bajjana. Pechina and its maritime port experienced divergent fortunes, and while the former progressively depopulated, the latter became the base of the Caliphal navy after 933, during the rule of Abd-ar-Rahman III. The port suffered a devastating Fatimid naval attack in 955 that exposed the Caliphate's defensive shortcomings. Also in 955, Abd-ar-Rahman III decided to erect the walls. A silk industry consisting of hundreds of looms and feeding itself from the mulberry trees planted in the region, fostered Almería's economy. Almería also became an important slave trade hub during the caliphal period.

In the wake of the collapse of the Caliphate of Córdoba in the early 11th century, Almería detached from Cordobese authority towards 1014 and became ruled as an independent taifa under Slavic kinglets. It submitted to the Taifa of Valencia in 1038, yet it soon became independent as a new taifa, ruled by the Arab Banu Sumadih until 1091, when it fell to Almoravid control. This allowed the city's economy to insert itself into the trade networks of the Almoravid empire. Building upon the previous development during the caliphal period, Almería reached a degree of historical relevance unmatched in the rest of its history throughout the 11th and 12th centuries, becoming the third-largest city of Al-Andalus. It was the largest industrial centre in all Andalus, boasting over 800 workshops for the manufacture of Tiraz textiles. Importing indigo dye and wool from the Maghreb and linen from Egypt, while it exported copper to Fez and Tlemcen as well as its highly sought textiles. It was also frequented by merchants from as far as Syria and had a strong silk and metal trade with Alexandria.

Contested by the emirs of Granada and Valencia, Almería experienced many sieges, including one especially fierce siege when Christians, called to the Second Crusade by Pope Eugene III, were also encouraged to counter the Muslim forces on a more familiar coast. On that occasion Alfonso VII, starting on 11 July 1147, at the head of mixed armies of Catalans, Genoese, Pisans and Franks, led a crusade against the rich city, and Almería was captured on 17 October 1147, marking the breakup of the city's period of splendor in the Middle Ages.

Within a decade, in 1157, Almería had passed to the control of Muslim Almohad rulers. Almería soon passed by the temporary overarching control of rebel Murcian emir Ibn Mardanish (1165–1169), hindering the early efforts of recovery in the city, that under the decade of Christian occupation reportedly had been left depopulated and, by and large, quite destroyed. During Almohad rule, the city did not return to its previous splendor, although the port remained trading with the Crown of Aragon and the Italian republics.

A block printed commercial stamp stating: "Stamp of the Almería Qaysarīya (warehouse), Year 750 (1349-1350 CE)" - It seems to have been used to indicate property ownership or potentially as proof that required taxes had been assessed on goods entering the city.

Following the rebellion against Almohad rule heralded by the likes of the Banu Hud and the Banu Mardanis, Almería submitted to the authority of Ibn Hud, who had raised the black banner and pledged nominal allegiance to Abbasid authorities by 1228. After Ibn Hud's assassination in Almería in 1238, the bulk of the remaining Muslim-controlled territories in the Iberian Peninsula passed to the control of rival ruler Ibn al-Aḥmar (sultan since 1232), who had set the capital of his emirate in Granada by 1238, constituting the Emirate of Granada, to which Almería belonged from then on. While relatively languishing throughout the Nasrid period, Almería still remained a key strategic port of the emirate together with Málaga, as well as a haven for pirates and political dissidents. It sustained intense trading relations with Aragon and the African port of Honaine. Almería endured a brutal siege by Aragonese forces in 1309 that, while eventually unsuccessful, left the city battered.

The city submitted to the sovereignty of the Catholic Monarchs on 22 December 1489. Relatively isolated and within the range of attacks from Barbary pirates, the hitherto mercantile city entered modernity by undergoing a process of heavy ruralization that imperiled its very same continued existence as a city.

Historically, there was a Jewish community in Almería dating to the 10th century, where members of the community mostly engaged in maritime trade. When the Jews were expelled in 1492, many living in Almería fled to North Africa.

The 16th century was for Almería a century of natural and human catastrophes; for there were at least four earthquakes, of which the one in 1522 was especially violent, devastating the city. The people who had remained Muslim were expelled from Almería after the War of Las Alpujarras in 1568 and scattered across the Crown of Castile. Landings and attacks by Barbary pirates were also frequent in the 16th century, and continued until the early 18th century. At that time, huge iron mines were discovered and French and British companies set up business in the area, bringing renewed prosperity and returning Almería to a position of relative importance within Spain.

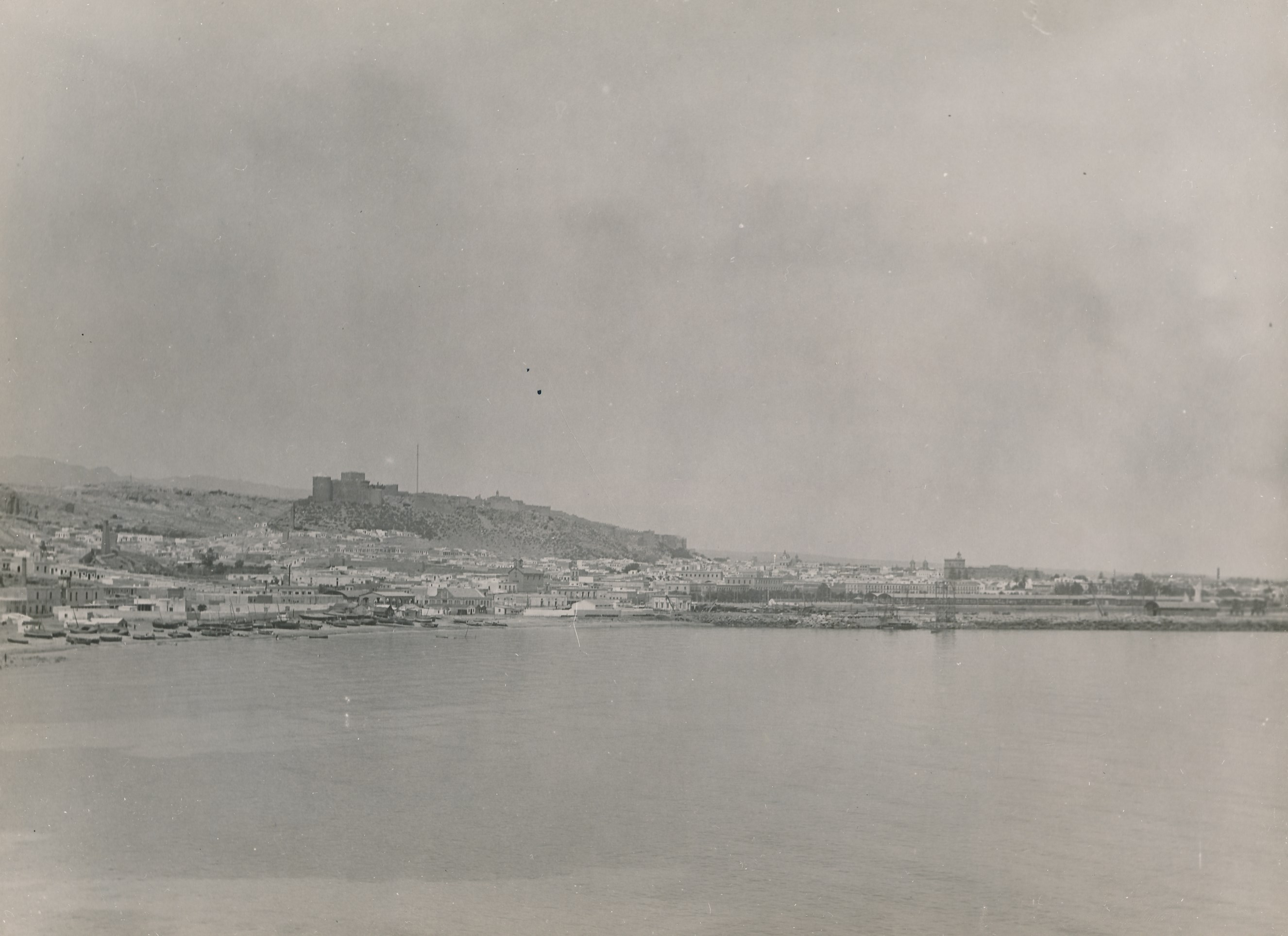
View of Almería during the Second Spanish Republic (1931–39)

During the Spanish Civil War the city was shelled by the German Navy, with news reaching the London and Parisian press about the "criminal bombardment of Almería by German planes". Almería surrendered in 1939, being the last Andalusian main city to fall to Francoist forces.

In the second half of the 20th century, Almería witnessed spectacular economic growth due to tourism and intensive agriculture, with crops grown year-round in massive invernaderos – plastic-covered "greenhouses" – for intensive vegetable production.

After Franco's death and popular approval of the new Spanish Constitution, the people of southern Spain were called on to approve an autonomous status for Andalusia region in a referendum. The referendum were approved with 118,186 votes for and 11,092 votes against in Almería province, which represented 42% of all registered voters.

== Geography ==
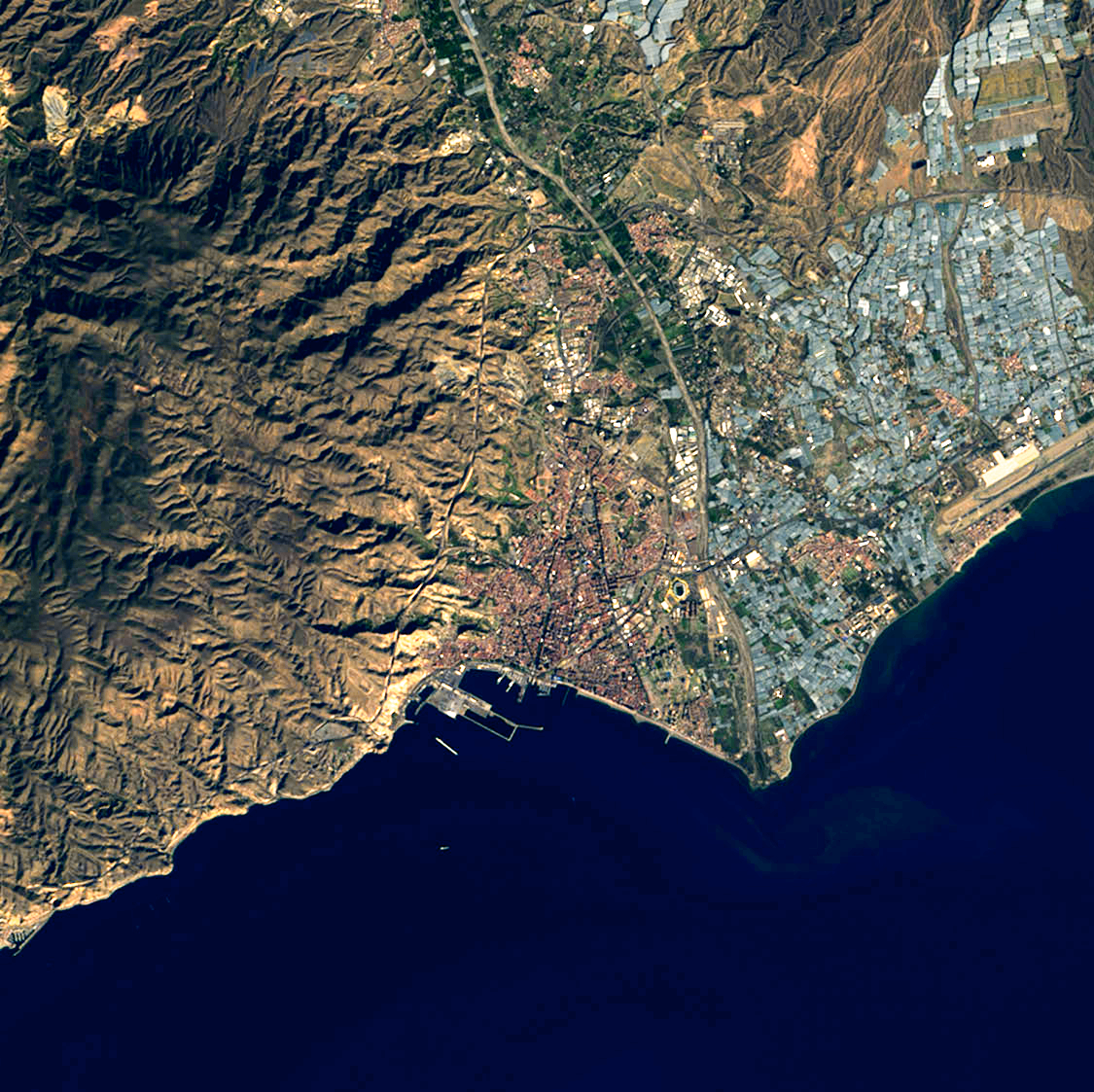
Satellite view centered on Almería

Due to its arid landscape, numerous Spaghetti Westerns were filmed in Almería and some of the sets still remain as a tourist attraction. These sets are located in the desert of Tabernas. The town and region were also used by David Lean in Lawrence of Arabia (1962), John Milius in The Wind and the Lion (1975), The Gospel of John (2003) and others.

One of Almería's most famous natural spots is the Cabo de Gata-Níjar Natural Park. This park is of volcanic origin, and is the largest and most ecologically significant marine-terrestrial space in the European Western Mediterranean Sea. The Cabo de Gata-Níjar Natural Park runs through the municipal areas of Níjar, Almerimar and Carboneras. Its villages, previously dedicated to fishing, have become tourism spots. The beaches of Cabo de Gata-Níjar Natural Park are also an attraction.

Almería has one islet that it administers as a part of its territory in the Alboran Sea, Alboran Island. The island has a small cemetery, a harbor, and a lighthouse, built in the 19th century.

=== Crystal cave ===
In 2000, a team of geologists found a cave filled with giant gypsum crystals in an abandoned silver mine near Almería. The cavity, which measures 8 by 1.8 by 1.7 metres (26.2 ft × 5.9 ft × 5.6 ft), may be the largest geode ever found. The entrance of the cave was blocked by five tons of rocks, and was under police protection (to prevent looters from entering). According to geological models, the cave was formed during the Messinian salinity crisis 6 million years ago, when the Mediterranean sea evaporated and left thick layers of salt sediments (evaporites). The site is currently open for tourists under guided tours.

=== Climate ===
According to the Köppen climate classification, Almería has a hot desert climate (Köppen BWh; Trewartha: BWal). Almería is the driest city in Europe and it is the only one with a hot desert climate, starting in the south-eastern outskirts of the city (still inside the municipality of Almería) until the Cabo de Gata-Níjar Natural Park located east of the city.

The BWh climate is present in the city of Almería, in nearby areas of Almería province (such as the Cabo de Gata-Níjar Natural Park, the Andarax/Almanzora river valleys), the only region in Europe to have this climate. This arid climatic region spreads along the coastline around Almería to Torrevieja, in the northeast. The nearby Faro del Cabo in the Cabo de Gata-Níjar Natural Park, has the lowest annual precipitation on the European continent (156 millimetres (6.1 in)) in the period 1961-1990 and around 140 millimetres (5.5 in) since 2010. With over 3,000 hours of sunshine across 320 days per year on average, Almería is considered one of the sunniest cities in Europe.

Almería is the only city in Continental Europe that has never registered any temperature below freezing in its recorded weather history. The coldest temperature recorded was 0.1 °C (32.2 °F) at the airport in January 2005. Before that, the previous record was 0.2 °C (32.4 °F) on 9 February 1935. Settled snow is unknown since 1935, although during the 20th century, light flurries (without settling) occurred on few occasions. (Note: Unsettled snow flurries were recorded on 1940, 1941, 1945, 1946, 1949, 1954 and 1956) The most important settled snowfall event occurred in 1926 and the snow arrived even at the coastline of the city. The last event with settled snowfall happened on 9 February 1935.

During the winter, daily maximum temperatures tend to stay around 17–18 °C (63–64 °F). At night, the minimum temperature is usually around 8–10 °C (46–50 °F). This makes the city of Almería one of the warmest in winter in Spain. The city only receives yearly precipitation of just 200 mm (7.9 in) and 26 days of precipitation annually; so while no month could be described as truly wet, there are strong seasonal differences in terms of precipitation and temperature, with coastal parts of the city (such as the Cabo de Gata-Níjar Natural Park) receiving a precipitation amount of 156 mm (6.1 in), and an annual temperature of 19.1 °C (66.4 °F), while mountainous areas (such as the Tabernas Desert) receive a precipitation amount of 220 mm (8.7 in) per year, and an average temperature of 17.9 °C (64.2 °F), so it would be classified as a cold desert climate (BWk) bordering a cold semi-arid climate (BSk).

Inland areas of the Almería province are believed to have reached temperatures above 45 °C (113 °F) in summer. Though temperatures above 40 °C (104 °F) are very rare in the city of Almería.

During the summer, the skies are usually sunny and almost no rainfall occurs. The typical daily temperatures are around 30 °C (86 °F) during the day while the minimum temperatures stay around 22 °C (72 °F) during July and August. As is the case for most of coastal Iberia, heatwaves in Almería are much less common than in the interior because of its coastal location; The hottest temperature recorded was 42.0 °C (107.6 °F) in August 2022. The highest minimum temperature ever recorded was 33.2 °C (91.8 °F) on 31 July 2001, which is also the highest ever recorded in peninsular Spain and Iberian Peninsula.

Climate data for Almería (Almería Airport) WMO ID: 08487; coordinates 36°50′47″N 02°21′25″W; elevation: 21 m (69 ft); (1991–2020) extremes (1933–present)
Month	Jan	Feb	Mar	Apr	May	Jun	Jul	Aug	Sep	Oct	Nov	Dec	Year
Record high °C (°F)	25.7 (78.3)	27.0 (80.6)	32.4 (90.3)	32.1 (89.8)	36.3 (97.3)	40.9 (105.6)	41.6 (106.9)	42.0 (107.6)	38.4 (101.1)	34.5 (94.1)	29.0 (84.2)	27.7 (81.9)	42.0 (107.6)
Mean maximum °C (°F)	20.8 (69.4)	21.7 (71.1)	24.4 (75.9)	27.4 (81.3)	31.4 (88.5)	35.7 (96.3)	37.4 (99.3)	37.4 (99.3)	33.2 (91.8)	29.6 (85.3)	24.9 (76.8)	22.1 (71.8)	38.6 (101.5)
Mean daily maximum °C (°F)	17.0 (62.6)	17.6 (63.7)	19.4 (66.9)	21.3 (70.3)	24.3 (75.7)	27.8 (82.0)	30.5 (86.9)	31.2 (88.2)	28.2 (82.8)	24.5 (76.1)	20.3 (68.5)	17.9 (64.2)	23.3 (73.9)
Daily mean °C (°F)	12.8 (55.0)	13.4 (56.1)	15.1 (59.2)	17.1 (62.8)	20.1 (68.2)	23.6 (74.5)	26.4 (79.5)	27.2 (81.0)	24.2 (75.6)	20.6 (69.1)	16.3 (61.3)	13.9 (57.0)	19.2 (66.6)
Mean daily minimum °C (°F)	8.7 (47.7)	9.2 (48.6)	10.9 (51.6)	12.9 (55.2)	15.8 (60.4)	19.3 (66.7)	22.2 (72.0)	23.1 (73.6)	20.2 (68.4)	16.6 (61.9)	12.3 (54.1)	9.8 (49.6)	15.1 (59.2)
Mean minimum °C (°F)	5.2 (41.4)	5.9 (42.6)	7.0 (44.6)	9.4 (48.9)	11.9 (53.4)	15.7 (60.3)	18.9 (66.0)	19.5 (67.1)	16.1 (61.0)	12.5 (54.5)	8.2 (46.8)	6.0 (42.8)	4.2 (39.6)
Record low °C (°F)	0.1 (32.2)	1.0 (33.8)	1.0 (33.8)	6.0 (42.8)	8.4 (47.1)	10.4 (50.7)	12.0 (53.6)	14.8 (58.6)	10.1 (50.2)	3.4 (38.1)	3.1 (37.6)	2.0 (35.6)	0.1 (32.2)
Average precipitation mm (inches)	20.8 (0.82)	23.3 (0.92)	20.7 (0.81)	15.2 (0.60)	10.9 (0.43)	5.5 (0.22)	0.6 (0.02)	2.3 (0.09)	16.1 (0.63)	25.2 (0.99)	25.1 (0.99)	31.8 (1.25)	197.5 (7.78)
Average precipitation days (≥ 1 mm)	2.7	2.7	3.1	2.6	1.6	0.6	0.2	0.3	1.9	3.1	3.2	3.0	25
Average relative humidity (%)	66	65	65	63	61	61	60	62	65	68	66	67	64
Average dew point °C (°F)	7.0 (44.6)	7.0 (44.6)	9.0 (48.2)	10.0 (50.0)	13.0 (55.4)	16.0 (60.8)	18.0 (64.4)	20.0 (68.0)	18.0 (64.4)	15.0 (59.0)	10.0 (50.0)	8.0 (46.4)	12.6 (54.7)
Mean monthly sunshine hours	195	198	242	270	307	336	353	329	261	226	192	186	3,095
Percentage possible sunshine	63.5	64.9	64.5	68.4	69.8	76.7	79.4	78.1	70.3	64.6	62.5	61.8	68.7
Source 1: Agencia Estatal de Meteorologia (AEMET OpenData)
Source 2: Time and Date (dewpoints, between 1985−2015)

Climate data for Almería Airport, 1981–2010 normals
Month	Jan	Feb	Mar	Apr	May	Jun	Jul	Aug	Sep	Oct	Nov	Dec	Year
Mean daily maximum °C (°F)	16.9 (62.4)	17.6 (63.7)	19.6 (67.3)	21.4 (70.5)	24.1 (75.4)	27.9 (82.2)	30.5 (86.9)	31.0 (87.8)	28.4 (83.1)	24.5 (76.1)	20.5 (68.9)	17.9 (64.2)	23.4 (74.1)
Daily mean °C (°F)	12.6 (54.7)	13.3 (55.9)	15.1 (59.2)	17.0 (62.6)	19.7 (67.5)	23.5 (74.3)	26.1 (79.0)	26.7 (80.1)	24.2 (75.6)	20.4 (68.7)	16.4 (61.5)	13.8 (56.8)	19.1 (66.4)
Mean daily minimum °C (°F)	8.3 (46.9)	9.0 (48.2)	10.6 (51.1)	12.5 (54.5)	15.3 (59.5)	18.9 (66.0)	21.7 (71.1)	22.4 (72.3)	20.0 (68.0)	16.3 (61.3)	12.3 (54.1)	9.6 (49.3)	14.7 (58.5)
Average precipitation mm (inches)	24 (0.9)	25 (1.0)	16 (0.6)	17 (0.7)	12 (0.5)	5 (0.2)	1 (0.0)	1 (0.0)	14 (0.6)	27 (1.1)	28 (1.1)	30 (1.2)	200 (7.9)
Average precipitation days (≥ 1 mm)	2.9	2.9	2.6	2.6	1.9	0.6	0.3	0.3	1.5	2.8	3.6	3.3	25.4
Average relative humidity (%)	67	67	65	62	63	61	60	63	65	68	67	67	65
Mean monthly sunshine hours	194	191	232	261	297	325	342	315	256	218	183	178	2,994
Mean daily daylight hours	10.5	11.3	12.4	13.6	14.6	15.2	14.9	14.0	12.8	11.7	10.7	10.2	12.7
Source: Agencia Estatal de Meteorología

== Demographics ==
Historical population

Year	Pop.	±%
1842	17,800	—
1857	27,036	+51.9%
1877	40,061	+48.2%
1887	35,865	−10.5%
1900	47,202	+31.6%
1910	47,637	+0.9%
1920	51,034	+7.1%
1930	52,409	+2.7%
1940	73,097	+39.5%

Year	Pop.	±%
1950	75,861	+3.8%
1960	86,680	+14.3%
1970	114,298	+31.9%
1981	140,745	+23.1%
1991	155,120	+10.2%
2001	166,328	+7.2%
2011	189,680	+14.0%
2021	200,273	+5.6%

Source: INE

== Culture ==
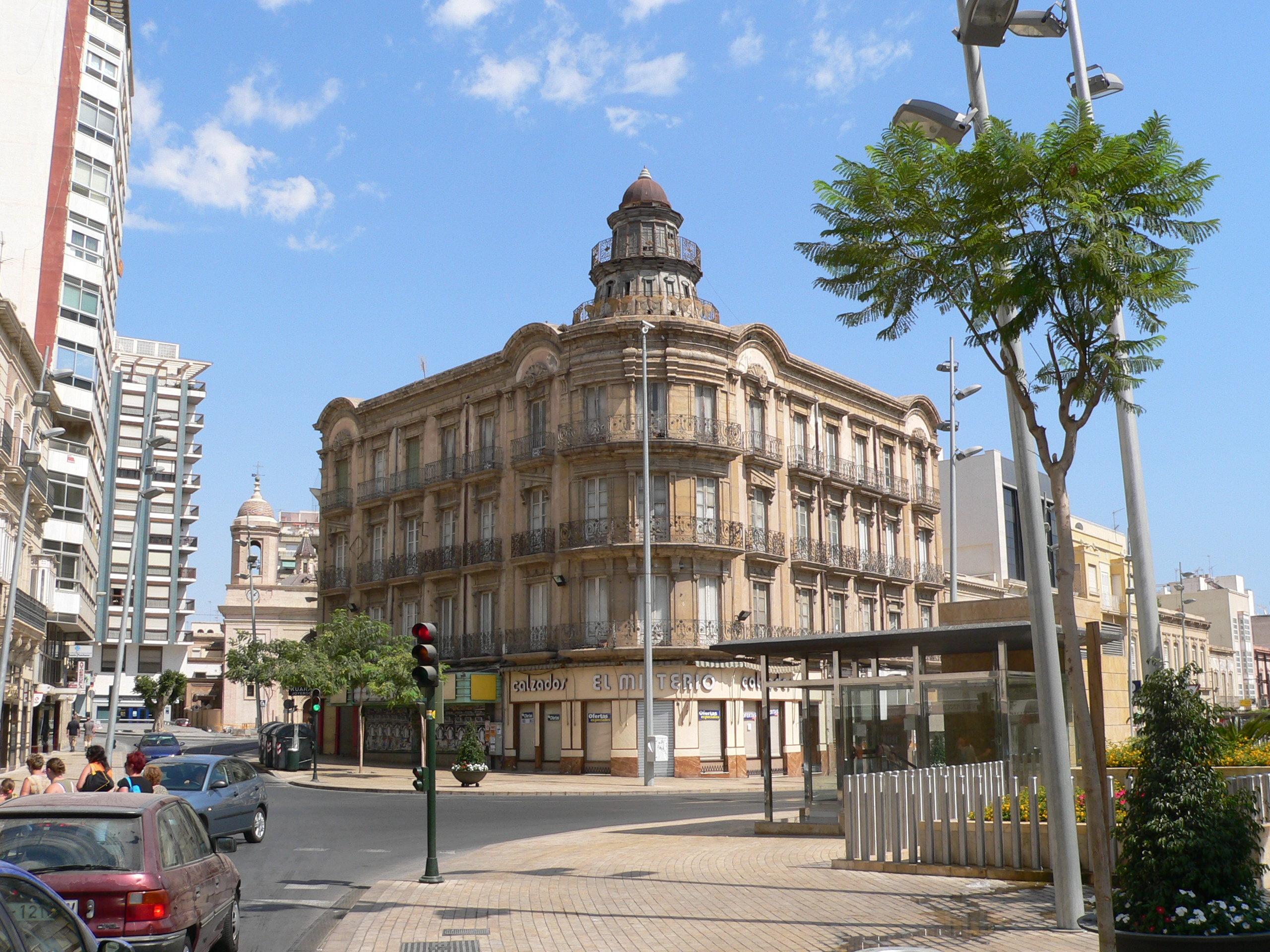
House of the Butterflies

Famous natives of Almería include Nicolás Salmerón y Alonso, who in 1873 was the third president of the First Spanish Republic, as well as several musicians, including the composer José Padilla Sánchez, whose music was declared of "universal interest" by Unesco in 1989, the popular folk singer Manolo Escobar, renowned Flamenco guitar player José Tomás "Tomatito" and Grammy Award winner David Bisbal; the champion motorcyclist Antonio Maeso moved to Almería as a child.

The Irish folk-rock group The Pogues paid tribute to Almería in "Fiesta", a song on the band's third album, If I Should Fall from Grace with God.

In 1989, English electronic band Depeche Mode filmed the video for their song "Personal Jesus" in Almería.

Tourism increased and hotels were all occupied from January to February during the filming of the sixth season of the TV series Game of Thrones.

=== Festivities ===
The festive events that occur in the municipality are listed below:

- Carnival
- Holy Week
- Cruces de mayo
- Saint Joan's Eve

=== Sports ===
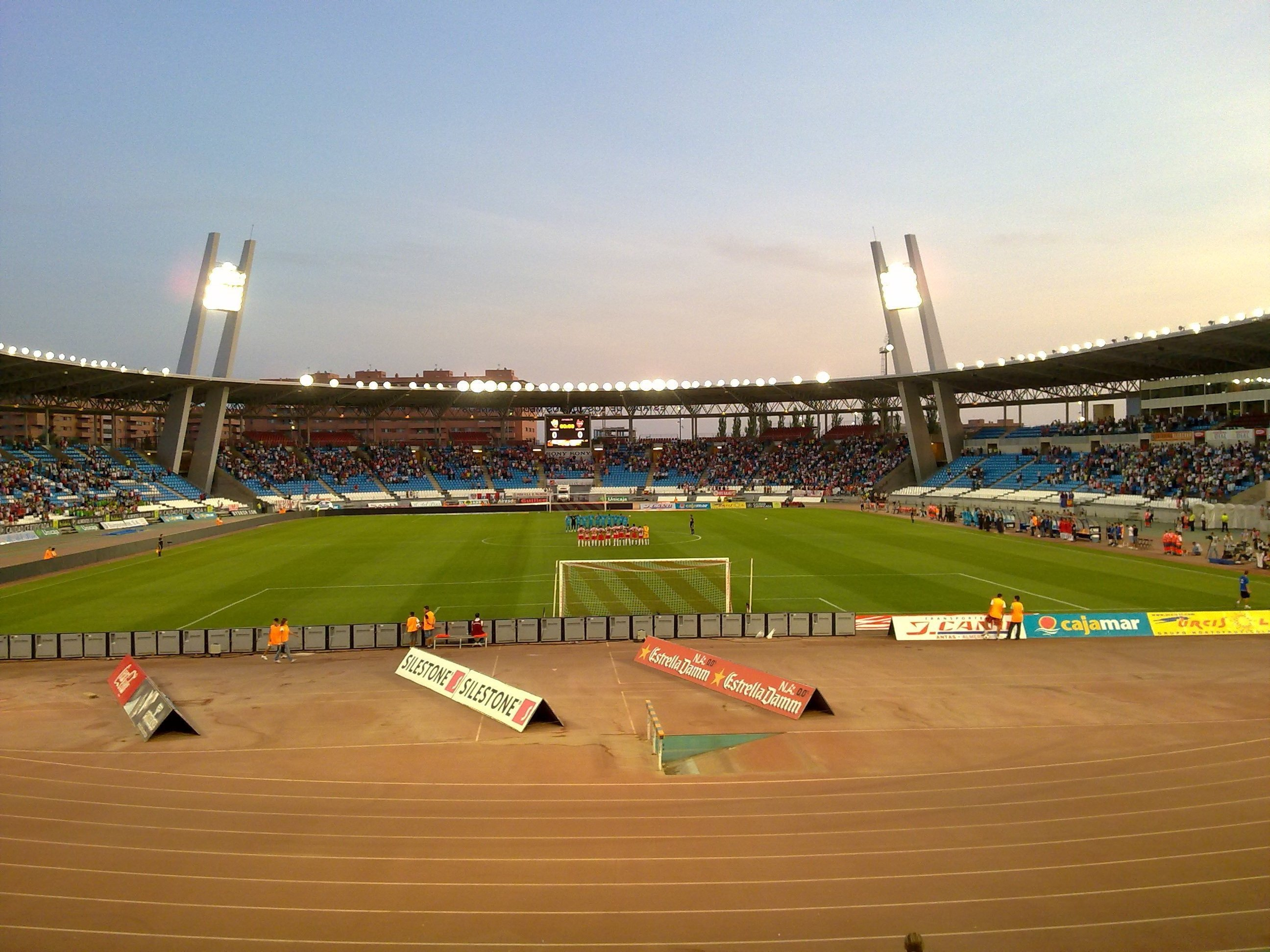
Estadio de los Juegos Mediterráneos

Almería hosted the Mediterranean Games in 2005. The city has two football teams: UD Almería, which was promoted to La Liga, the top tier of Spanish football, in 2022, and CP Almería, which plays in the División de Honor, the sixth tier.

The Plaza de toros de Almería is the main bullring in Almería. It has a capacity of 10,000 and it opened in 1882.

== Notable locations ==
- The Alcazaba, a medieval fortress that was begun in the 10th century but destroyed by an earthquake in 1522. It includes a triple line of walls, a majestic keep and large gardens. It commands a city quarter with buildings dressed in pastel colors, of Muslim-age aspect. It is the second largest among the Muslim fortresses of Andalusia, after the Alhambra.
- Almería air raid shelters, underground galleries for civilian protection during the Spanish Civil War, currently the longest in Europe open for tourists.
- The Cathedral has a fortress-like appearance due to its towers, merlons and protected paths, created to defend it from Mediterranean pirates. Originally designated as a mosque, it was later converted into a Christian church, before being destroyed in the 1522 earthquake. In the 16th century it was rebuilt in the Renaissance style, whilst keeping some of its defensive features.
- Renaissance church of Santiago, built in 1533, with tower and portal decorated with reliefs.
- Chanca, a group of houses carved into rocks.
- Castle of San Cristobal, now in ruins. It is connected to the Alcazaba by a line of walls.
- Museum of Almería. Includes findings from Prehistoric, Iberic, Roman, Greek ages and Muslim objects, mostly from the Alcazaba.
- Paseo de Coches, a modern seaside promenade with gardens and palms.
- Cable Inglés (English Pier), 1904 iron railway pier built to transfer iron ore, copper, and silver produced by British- and French-run mines in Granada from trains to waiting cargo ships.
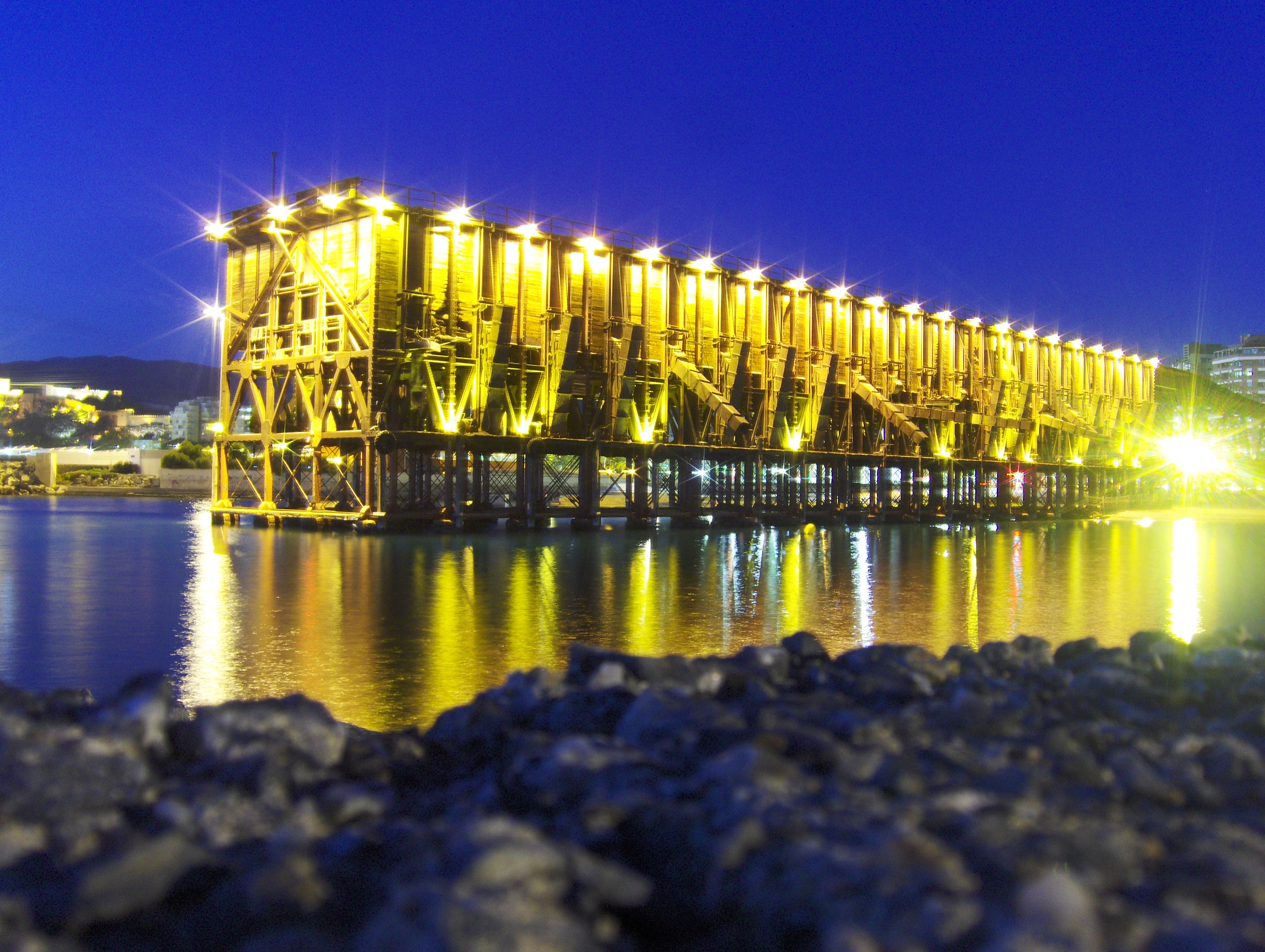
Cable Inglés, at night

Alcazaba of Almería

The ancient walls of Jayrán

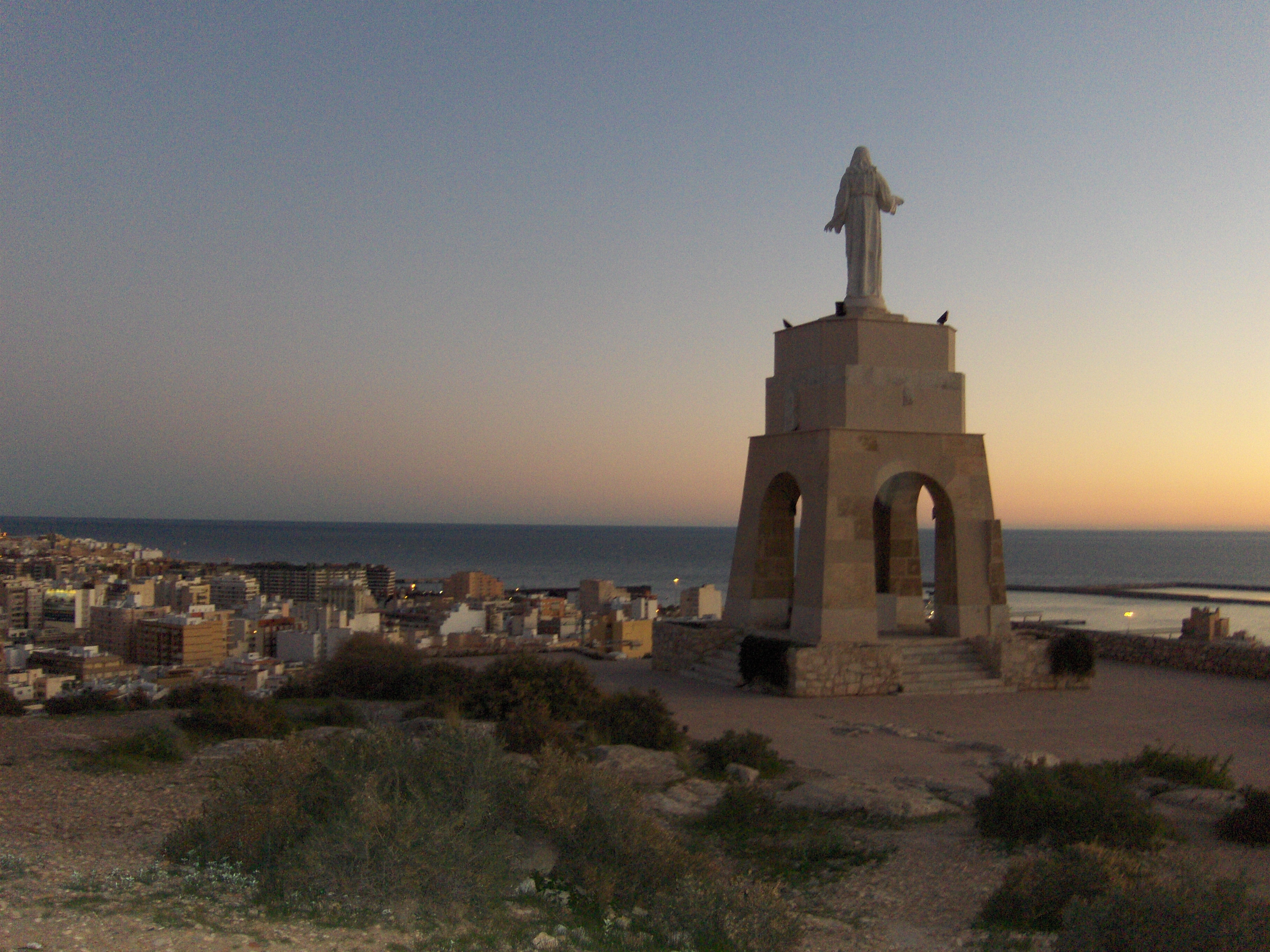
The statue of San Cristóbal

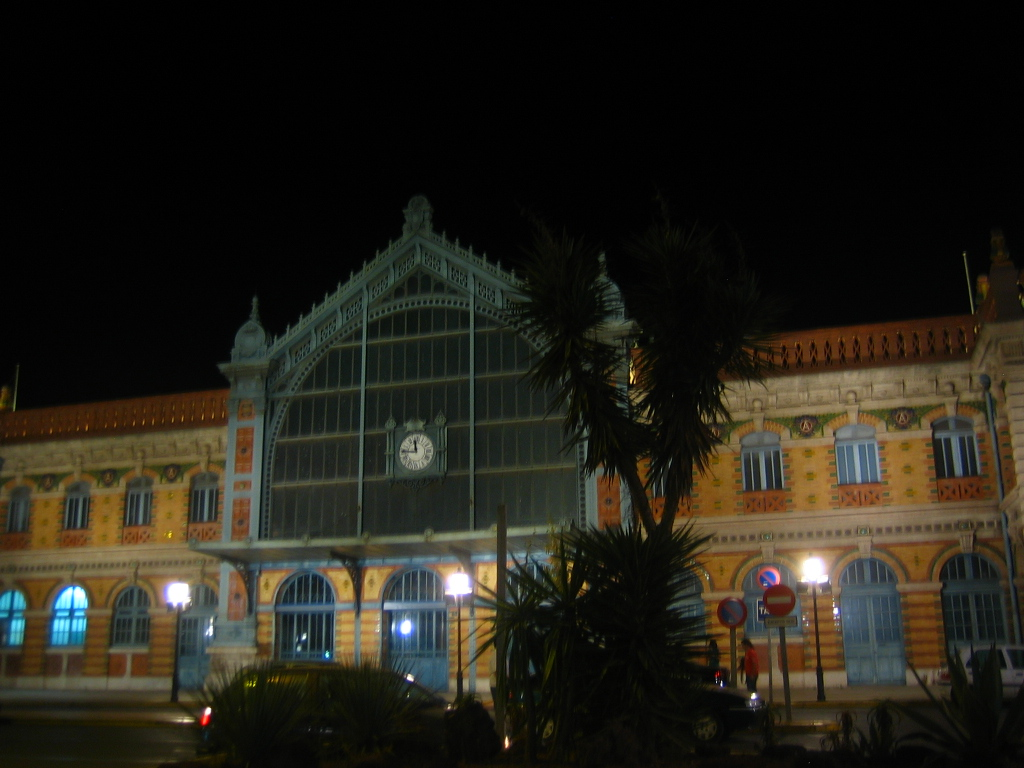
The former train station

== Economy ==
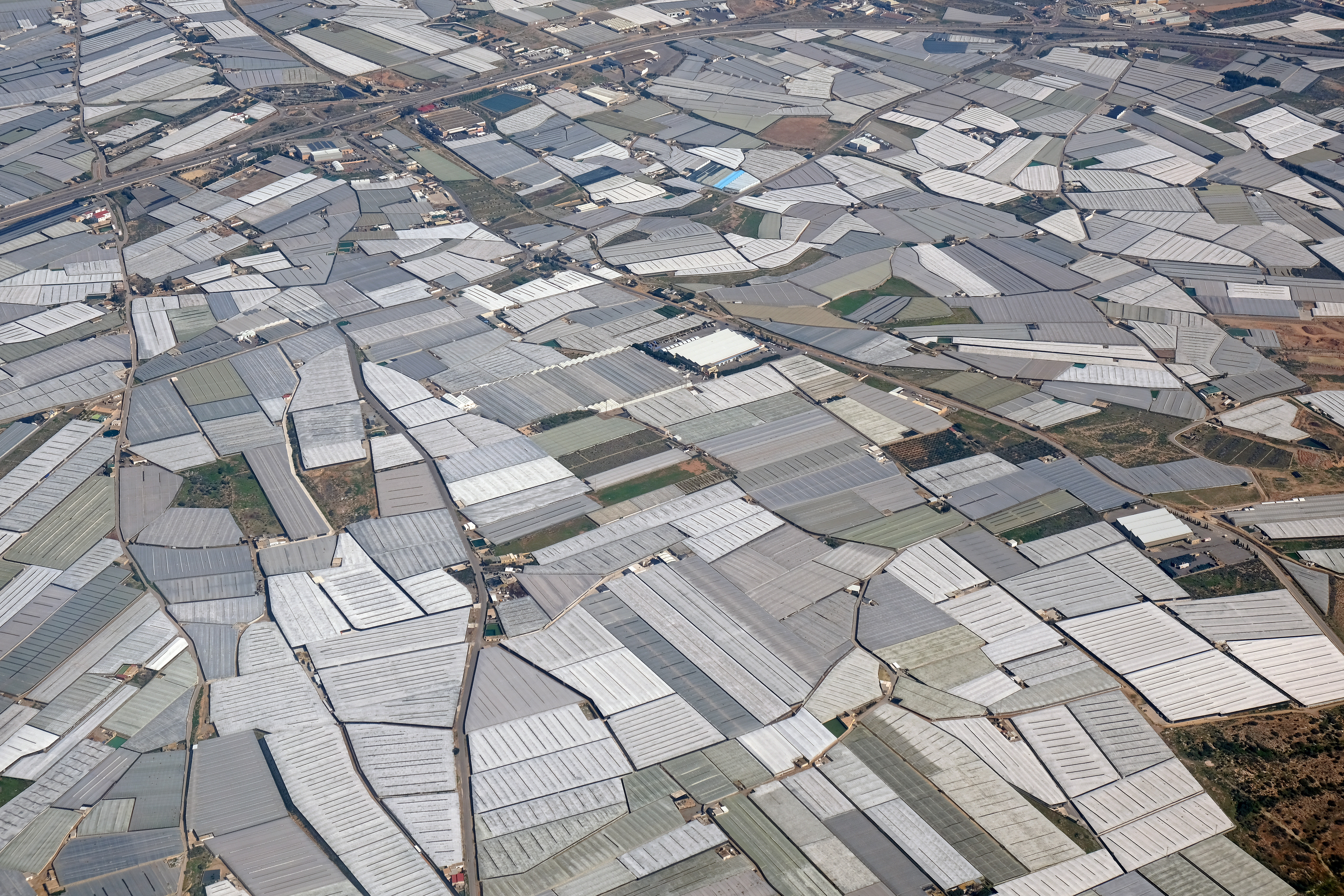
Greenhouses near Almería

Intensive agriculture has been the most important economic sector of Almería for the last 50 years. Nowadays, greenhouse production, handling and commercialisation of vegetables, and the supply industry of the sector, represent almost 40% of Almería's GDP. Directly, agricultural production accounts for 18.2% of the provincial GDP. In Andalusia, the average contribution is 6.6% and in Spain it is only 2.9%.

This situation is the result of an innovative dynamic model, which can continually incorporate new technologies: using soil sanding, plastic covers, drip irrigation systems, hybrid seeds, soil-less cultivation, irrigation programs, new greenhouse structures, and so on. They all allowed to improve production and increase commercialisation calendars, assuring the profitability and quality of the crops and the competitiveness of the markets. Moreover, Almería's economy has an important exporting function: 75% of production was sold abroad in 2018, with a value of 2,400 million euros.

This development is explained by familiar investment, as subsidies have been limited or non-existent. In this sense, the horticultural sector receives the least European aid from the Common Agricultural Policy: 1.9% of total income. This figure is much lower than that received by other sectors such as olive groves (33%) or cereals (53%).

The production of this area is based on fair competition with officially a just remuneration of employees, with similar salaries than the ones in the same sector in Europe: 8% higher than Italy and 11% than Belgium. This avoids the social dumping exerted by non-EU countries, like Morocco, with salaries up to 90% lower than those of Almería. However, there is well-documented widespread exploitation of workers from North Africa who work and live in terrible conditions, earning much lower than the minimum wage.

From a social point of view, Almería and Granada are an example of family-owned and smallholder agriculture, with small farms and little concentration of land. This social nature generates high equity in the level of income and welfare: social cohesion is produced, and inequality is reduced. Concretely, Almería is made up of 12,500 farms with an average of 2.5 hectares and 30% of familiar labour. The high education levels of the farmers are also significant, which demonstrates an innovative and receptive character towards continuing education: 81.2% of farmers have some type of formal academic training.

At the same time, a commercial system based on social economy enterprises has been developed, e.g. as cooperative societies. These companies represent 62% of production and sales. They assure the access to the market in optimal conditions, because they increase its position inside the agri-food supply chain, facilitate financing, technical advice, and incorporation of technology. Moreover, local ties increase environmental sustainability.

== Transport ==
By land, Almería can be reached by the A-7 Mediterranean Highway, which connects the Mediterranean area with the Spanish A-92 that unites it with the rest of Andalusia. Almería railway station is served by Renfe Operadora with direct rail services to Granada, and Madrid Atocha using a branch off the Alcázar de San Juan–Cádiz railway; the Linares Baeza–Almería railway. In the future, high-speed rail AVE services will link Almería to Madrid via Murcia. The central railway station has been closed for several months and it is not known exactly when it will re-open. Passengers currently start their journey by being bussed a few kilometres to Huercal de Almería station.

By sea, the port of Almería has connections to Melilla, Algeria, Morocco, and tourist cruises in the Mediterranean. It also has a marina with moorings for pleasure boats. Currently the port of Almería is being expanded with new docks and transformed into a container port to take large-scale international shipping and thereby increase its freight traffic. It normally connects with the following destinations:

- Acciona: Ghazaouet (Algeria), Oran (Algeria), Nador (Morocco) and Melilla.
- Comarit: Nador.
- Comanav: Nador.

By air, Almería is served by Almería Airport, the fourth largest in Andalusia. The winter timetable includes flights to Madrid, Barcelona, Melilla, London, and Seville, with international connections to Manchester, Birmingham, Brussels, Dublin and Swiss, German and other EU airports being added during the summer.

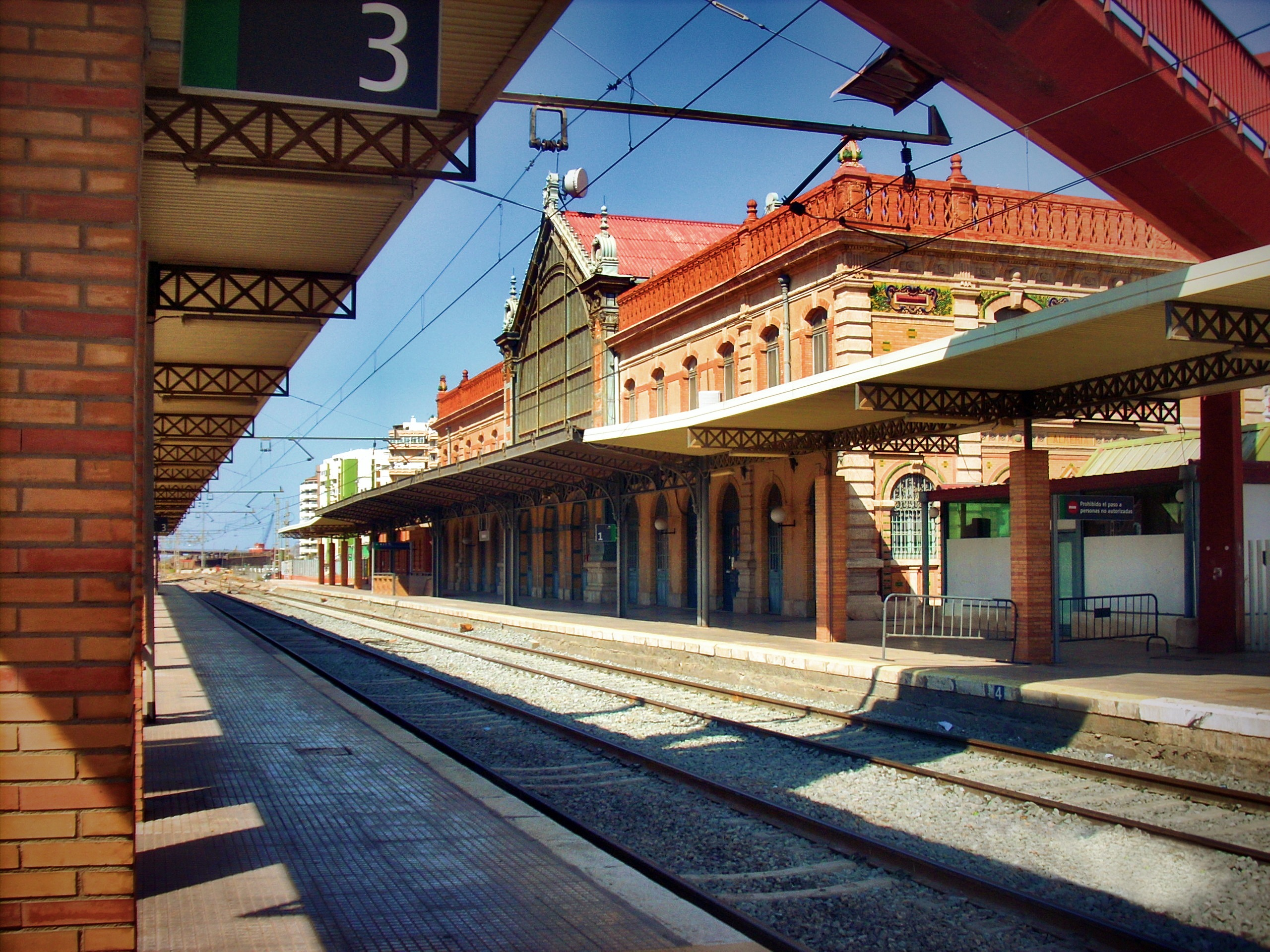
Almería rail station

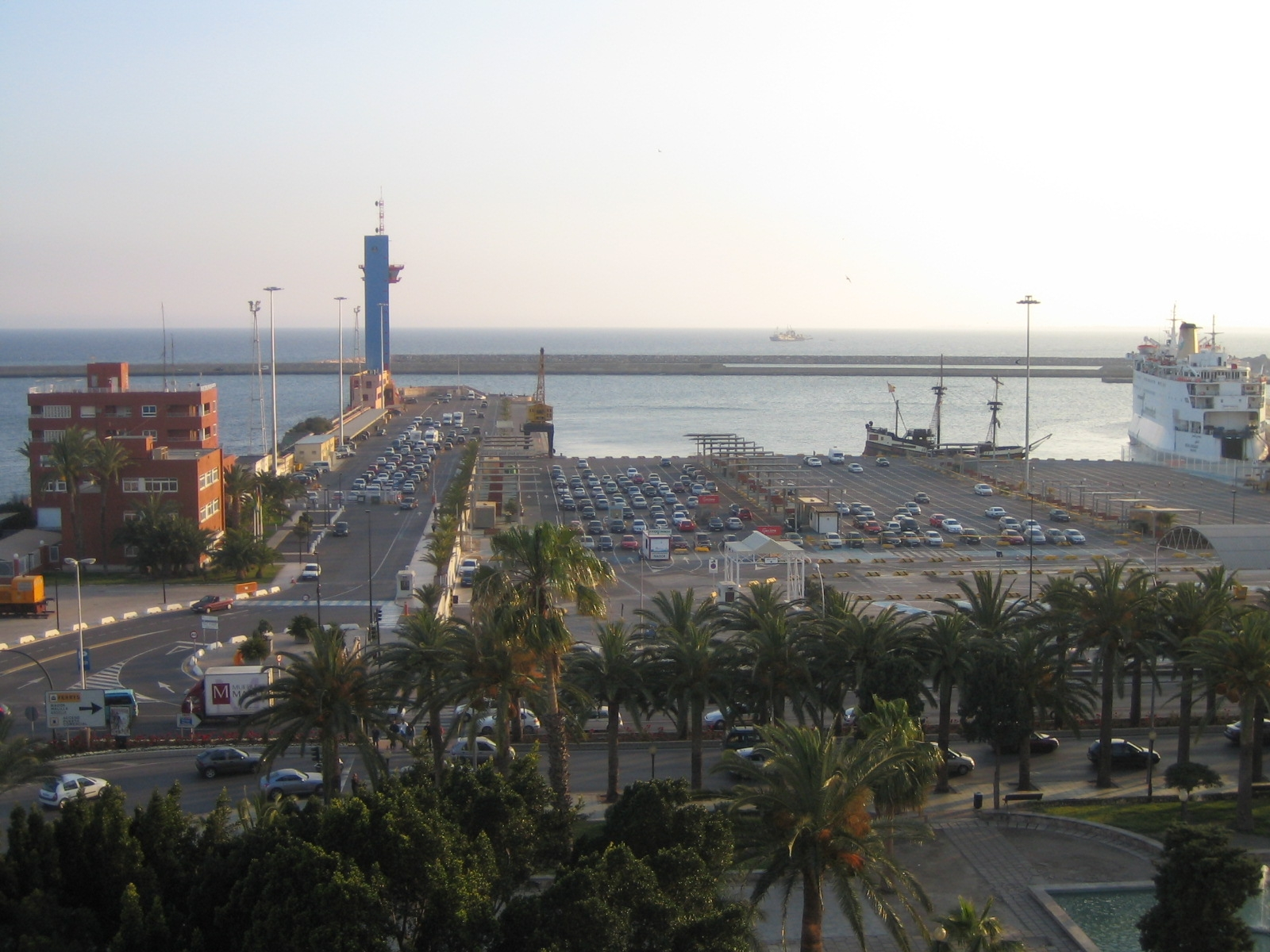
Harbour of Almería

== Notable people ==
- Said al-Andalusi (1029–1070), mathematician, astronomer and philosopher
- Francisco Losada (1612–1667), composer
- Luis de Soria Iribarne (1851–1935), guitarist and composer
- Jimena Quirós (1899–1983), Spanish scientist, considered the first female oceanographer in the country and the first female staff scientist of the Spanish Institute for Oceanography (IEO)
- Lita Baron (1923–2015), actress, singer and dancer
- Chus Lampreave (1930–2016), actress
- Nieves Navarro (born 1938), actress
- Manuel Lao Hernández (born 1944), founder of Cirsa, Spain's largest casino operator
- José Torres "Tomatito" (born 1958), flamenco guitar player
- Juan Martínez Oliver (born 1964), road bicycle racer
- Mar Abad (born 1972), journalist, writer and businesswoman
- David Bisbal (born 1979), Grammy Award winner
- Rosa García-Malea López (born 1981), first female fighter pilot in the Spanish Air Force
- Eduardo del Pino Vicente (b. 20th century), journalist and writer

== See also ==
- Helianthemum almeriense
- List of municipalities in Almería

== Bibliography ==
- Aziz Salem, Abdel (1979–1980). "Algunos aspectos del florecimiento económico de Almería islámica durante el período de los taifas y de los almorávides" (PDF). Revista del Instituto Egipcio de Estudios Islámicos (20): 7–22. ISSN 1132-3485.
- Mazzoli-Guintard, Christine (May 2016). "Almería, ¿ciudad-mundo en los siglos XI y XII?". Carolvs, Homenaje a Friedrich Edelmayer. Alcalá la Real: Ayuntamiento de Alcalá la Real. pp. 241–249. ISBN 978-84-89014-76-3.
- Melo, Diego Carrasco (2019). "El sultanato Nazarí de Granada y la frontera (S. XIII-XV)". Revista Encrucijada Americana. 11 (2). Santiago: Universidad Alberto Hurtado. ISSN 0719-3432.
- Molina López, Eduardo (1990). "Almería en la etapa Nasri (siglos XIII al XV). Estado de la cuestión, balance y perspectivas" (PDF). Almería entre culturas: (siglos XIII-XVI). Vol. 1. Instituto de Estudios Almerienses de la Diputación de Almería. pp. 15–68. ISBN 84-86862-43-4.
- Rodríguez Escudero, Luis Orlando (2017). Análisis arquitectónico y recreación virtual de los baños árabes, del Conjunto Monumental, La Alcazaba de Almería (PDF) (Master in ingeniery and architecture). University of Cordoba.
- Rogers, Clifford J. (2010). The Oxford Encyclopedia of Medieval Warfare and Military Technology: Vol. 1. Oxford University Press. ISBN 978-0195334036.
- Sánchez Sedano, María del Pilar (1985). "Inventario de arquitectura musulmana en la provincia de Almería" (PDF). Boletín del Instituto de Estudios Almerienses. Letras (5): 163–188. ISSN 0211-7541.
- Viguera Molins, María Jesús (2014). "Los reinos de taifas y el reino aftasí" (PDF). In Zozaya Stabel-Hansen, Juan; Kurtz Schaefer, Guillermo S. (eds.). Estudios sobre el reino aftasí. Badajoz: Consejería de Educación y Cultura. Junta de Extremadura. ISBN 978-84-9852-429-1.
