= Rosa García-Malea López =

First female fighter pilot in Spanish Air Force

- Born: Rosa García-Malea; 1981 (age 44–45); Almería
- Military career
- Allegiance: Spain
- Branch: Spanish Air Force
- Service years: 2003-
- Rank: Capitán
- Conflicts: Libyan war 2011
- Other work: F/A-18 Hornet, CASA C-101, Patrulla Águila pilot

Rosa María García-Malea López (born 1981) became the first female fighter pilot in the Spanish Air Force after qualifying to fly jet fighter aircraft in 2006.

== Early life ==
Rosa García-Malea López was born in 1981 in Almería, Spain.

== Military service ==
García-Malea is one of the first female fighter pilots in the Spanish Air Force qualified to fly F/A-18 Hornet, With more than 1,250 flight hours and after participating in the Libyan war in 2011, after 15 years service in the Spanish air force, she joined Patrulla Águila, the aerobatic demonstration team, as a CASA C-101 pilot. In 2018 she was awarded the Medalla de Andalucía for her achievements.
