= Eduardo del Pino Vicente =

Spanish writer and journalist

- Born: XX century Almería, Spain
- Education: IES Celia Viñas
- Alma mater: Universidad de Almería
- Occupations: Writer and journalist
- Years active: 2011–
- Organization: La Voz de Almería
- Parents: Miguel del Pino Santisteban (1917–2007) (father); María Vicenta Felices (1911–2010) (mother)
- Relatives: Juan del Pino Vicente; Miguel del Pino Vicente

Eduardo del Pino Vicente is a Spanish writer and journalist. In September 2017 he was named "vecino ejemplar" for the XVII Semana Cultural del Casco Histórico de Almería, and a new municipal library in Almeria was suggested to be named as Eduardo D. Vicente by CSIF.

He wrote about the franquism in Almeria in his works Almería, Memoria Compartida, Almas de Barrio and Almería, Los Años vividos.
