= Almería air raid shelters =

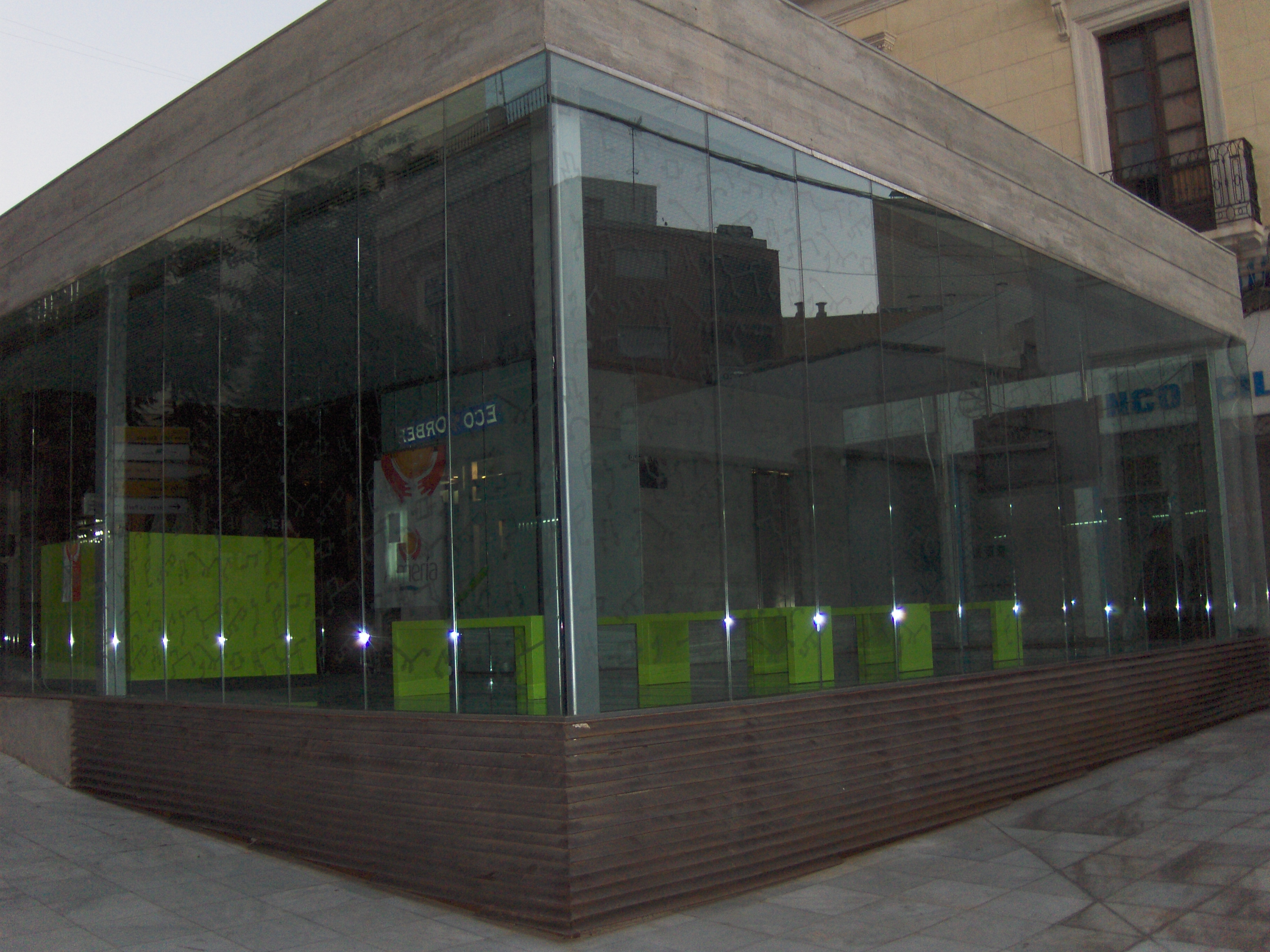
Entrance to the shelters.

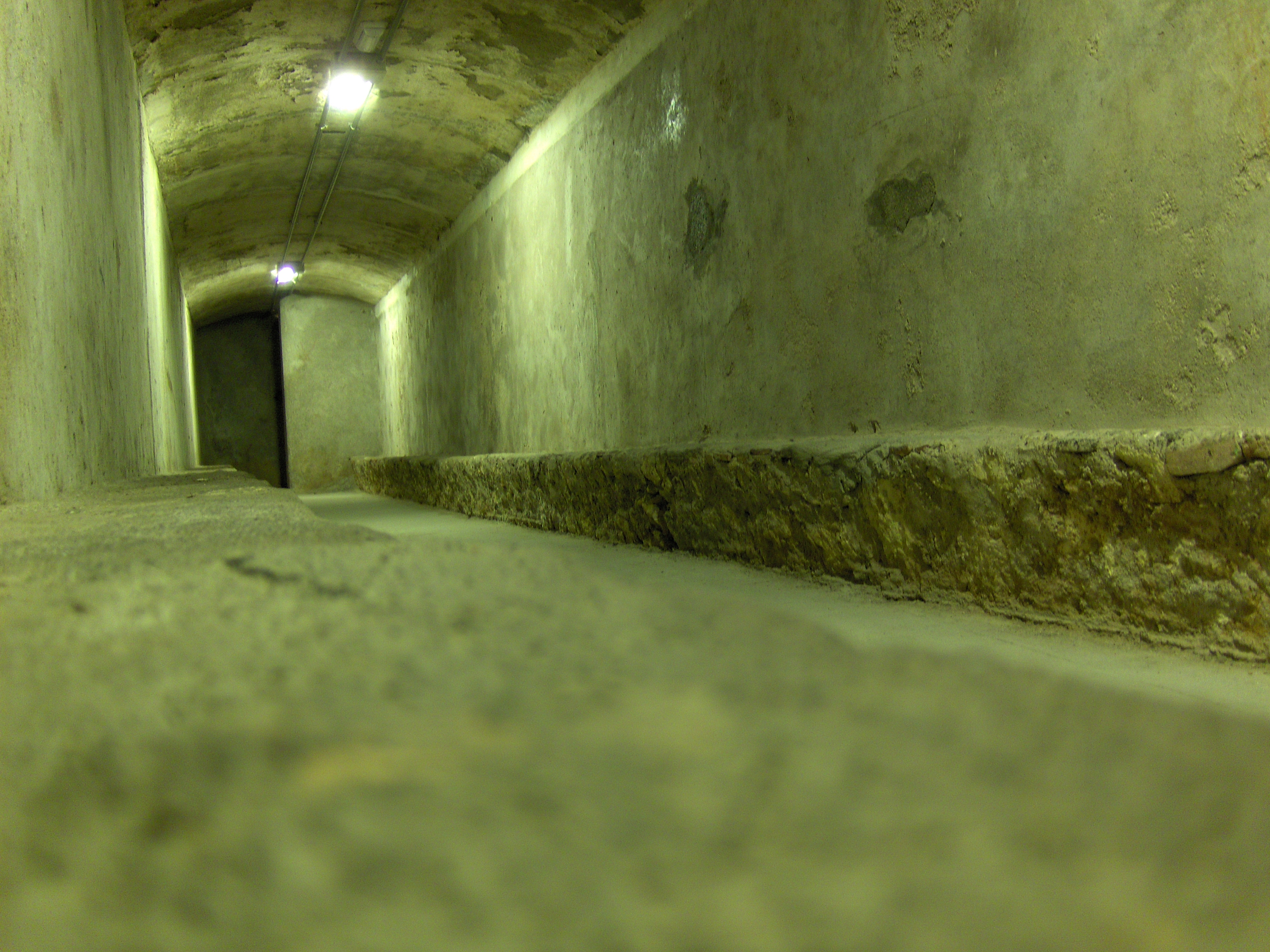
View of the interior of the galleries.

The Spanish city of Almería suffered up to 52 bombings from air and sea, with a total of 754 bombs dropped during the Spanish Civil War. This led to the decision to create a system of underground shelters for the protection of approximately 40,000 civilians. These shelters measure more than 4.5 km long, and they are equipped with a surgery room and a food storage room. They were designed by the local architect Guillermo Langle Rubio, being today the most important and better preserved shelters in all Europe.

== History ==
Its history began on 22 January 1937, after signing a project known as "The Project of Shelters against bombings in the city of Almería. The cost of its construction was estimated to be 4.5 million pesetas, of which the Central Government subsidized for 2 million. During the construction of these shelters, the government of the city established a special tax of 1% on all purchases to allow this expenditure, along with the cooperation of political parties and unions, contributions from business and voluntary labor work of some citizens. Its construction took a total of 16 months.

There is only one original plan, which is supposedly incomplete, that of the layout of the shelters. It is a document printed on onionskin paper dating from 1937, which designs for engravings on the outside of the shelters taken after rehabilitation.
