= Manuel Lao Hernández =

Spanish businessman

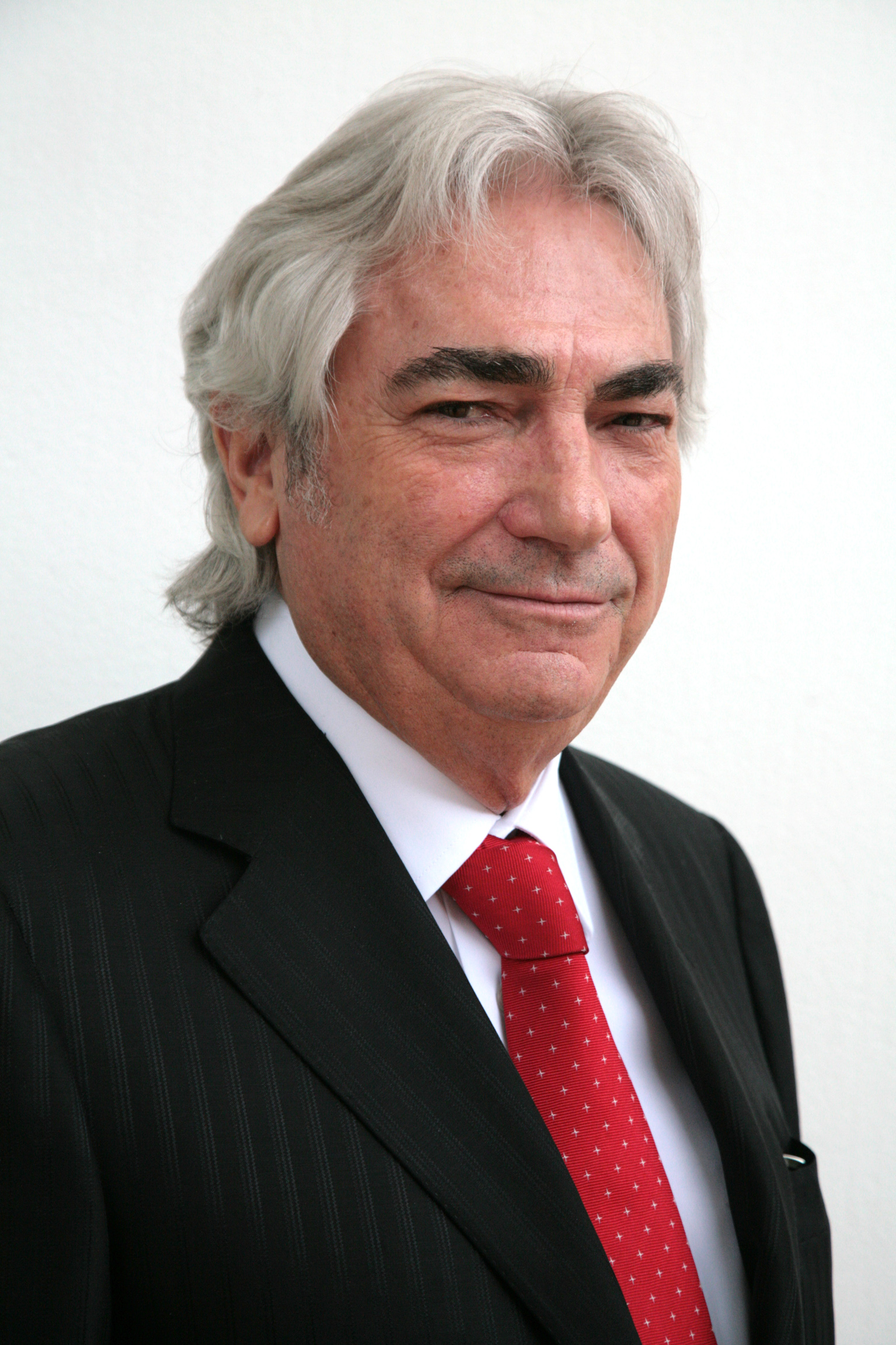
- Born: 1944 (age 81–82); Almería, Spain
- Title: Founder, Cirsa
- Children: 3

Manuel Lao Hernández (born 1944) is a Spanish billionaire, and the founder of Cirsa, Spain's largest casino company.

Lao was born in Almería in 1944. He is married, with three children, and lives in Matadepera, Spain.
