= Cirsa =

Spanish gambling company

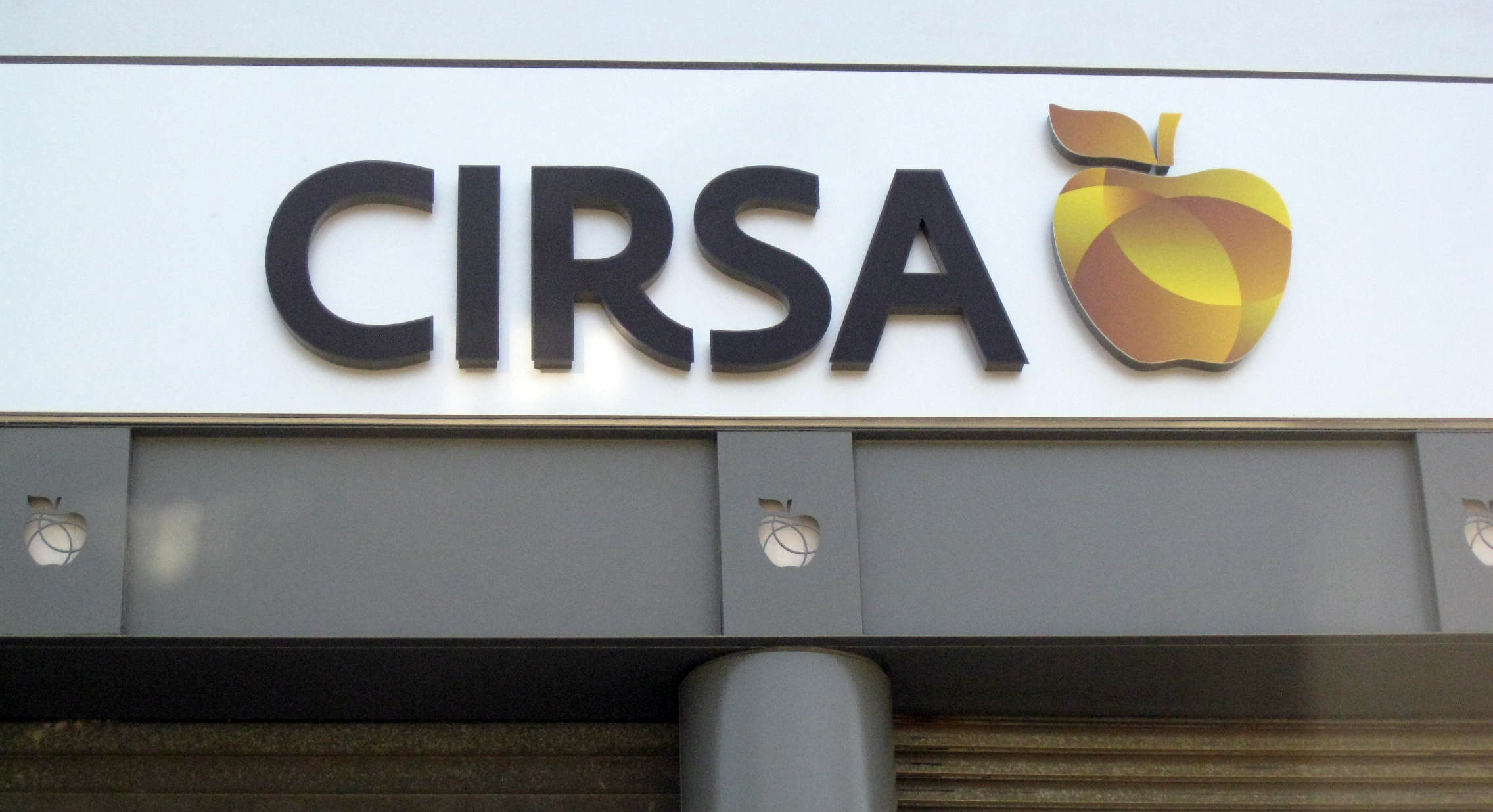
- Type: Public
- Traded as: BMAD: CIRSA
- Industry: Gambling
- Founded: 1978
- Founder: Manuel Lao Hernández
- Headquarters: Terrassa, Catalonia, Spain
- Areas served: Europe and Latin America
- Key people: Joaquim Agut (Executive Chairman)
- Revenue: €2.15 billion (2024)
- Operating income: €699 million (2024)
- Owner: Blackstone Inc. (2018–present)
- Number of employees: 15,510 (2024)
- Website: www.cirsa.com

Cirsa Enterprises, S.A. (branded CIRSA) is a Spanish multinational casino and gambling‑machine operator founded in Terrassa in 1978. The group runs 447 casinos and gambling halls and more than 83,000 slot machines across eleven regulated markets, making it Spain’s largest casino operator. Private‑equity firm Blackstone bought the company in 2018 and is now floating up to 25 % of its shares on the Bolsa de Madrid at a set price of €15, implying a post‑money valuation of €2.5 billion. Cirsa posted record revenue of €2.15 billion and EBITDA of €699 million in 2024, its third consecutive year of all‑time‑high results.

== History ==
Cirsa was founded in 1978 by Manuel Lao Hernández. It is involved in the fabrication and distribution of different types of gambling machines. By 1990, they started to expand their presence outside of Spain. It started with the Dominican Republic, then in 1991 went to Venezuela, and currently over seventy countries around the world. The company generated 349,328,000 million euros of revenue solely in the first quarter of 2018

On 8 April 2022, Cirsa announced the organisation had appointed Antonio Hostench as CEO.

In 2024, Cirsa acquired Apuesta Total, Peru's online gambling operator.

== Blackstone takeover ==
In April 2018, it was announced that The Blackstone Group would acquire the company. Blackstone Inc. acquired Cirsa in July 2018 for an enterprise value of about €2.2 billion, according to Refinitiv data cited by Reuters.

== Controversies ==
A 2023 Cyprus Confidential leak revealed Cirsa was embroiled in a tax dispute over two Moroccan casinos it bought from Israel’s Red Sea Group. Le Desk reported that Cirsa sought reimbursement for past taxes, while investigators questioned inflated fee invoices linked to a shell advisory firm.
