= Flag of Almería =

- Adopted: 1997

The flag of Almería was adopted in 1997 with a smooth red cross and a white back. The cross of Saint George was adopted after the Reconquista by the Reyes Católicos in 1489.
