= Manuel del Águila =

- Born: 13 June 1914; El Alquián, Almería
- Died: 8 November 2006 (aged 92); Aguadulce, Almería
- Occupations: Poet, composer and painter

Manuel del Águila (1914–2006) was a Spanish poet, versatile composer and painter born in the El Alquián neighborhood, in Almería (Andalusia), on 13 June 1914 and died on 8 November 2006 in Aguadulce (Roquetas de Mar, province of Almería, Andalusia).

== Education ==
The fifth of six children, Manuel del Águila lost his father and mother at only six years old in 1920. Close friends of the family, Francisco Bracho Cambronero and Dolores Bonilla Vega, took charge of his upbringing with Manuela, the nursemaid with whom Manuel del Aguila would remain close throughout his life.

That year he entered the College of the Brothers of the Christian Schools, playing close attention to his studies. From that age he received his first piano and first French lessons. His interest in language, music, literature, drawing and art in general was therefore developed quite early. He competed in various literary and musical events locally and nationally. He won, for example, the Juegos Florales poetry contest held in Almeria in 1955.

== Painter, language teacher, journalist ==
He was a fellow student and friend of Arturo Medina and Jesus de Perceval, with whom he attended classes in drawing and painting at the School of Arts and Crafts in the Almeria capital, where he was awarded a silver medal for his work.

In this institution he taught French during the years 1950 and 1951, and later created a private school in which he taught French classes and later English. It was one of the first schools of its kind in Almeria and thousands of students would pass through it.

From 1961 he was involved in several informational and literary programs of Radio Nacional of Spain, working as a correspondent until the 80s. For them he interviewed nearly all the filmmakers and actors who passed through the province of Almeria in the film boom years and covered events such as the Palomares hydrogen bombs incident.

He also worked with national and local media for several years, including ABC, La Vanguardia, Sur de España, Yugo, Ideal, La Voz de Almería and El Mundo, and published many articles on many subjects. These collaborations were extended to magazines specializing in literature such as Green Gold, Nouvelles Litteraires, Reader's Digest and Poética Bahía.

== Composer, lyricist and writer ==
In 1950 he composed a Christmas piece with lyrics by Celia Viñas. The following year, in 1951, he added lyrics to the Hymn-Prayer, composed by Jose Padilla to the Virgin of the Sea, patron saint of Almeria. In 1956, he did the same with the Hymn-Prayer to the Holy Cross of the Vote patron of the Alpujarran town of Canjáyar, whose brotherhood are also custodians of the copyrights to it.

in 1955 he published Canciones andaluzas (Andalusian songs), a first taste of his effort to revive folk poetry and customs, to great success. In 1973 he received compliments from the Nobel laureate Vicente Aleixandre, with whom he had published a poem in the Magazine Poética Bahía. In 1988 his book Seis chiquillos en la orilla (Six kids on the shore) was published, with illustrations by the artist Carmen Pinteño, which received critical acclaim locally and nationally. In 2003, the Ministry of Culture of the Andalusian Government published, in collaboration with La Voz de Almería, an anthology of all his poetry, Aqui, junto al mar latino (Here, by the Latino seaside).

With respect to musical compositions, he was a composer of numerous folkloric pieces. Noteworthy are Peteneras de la orilla (Peteneras from the shore), Zorongo de la Luna (the Zorongo of the Moon), Campanilleros de Cabo de Gata (Bellmen from Cabo de Gata) and Si vas pa la mar (If you go by the sea), made famous by Manolo Escobar. The Emilio Carrion Chamber Choir recorded the CD Concierto Homenaje a Manuel del Águila (Tribute Concert to Manuel del Aguila) in 2004, with polyphonic versions of several of his songs, some of them unpublished. He also wrote the lyrics for the Fandanguillo de Almeria.

== Awards and recognition ==
Manuel del Águila dedicated his professional life to many conferences in addition to socializing, reciting and playing the piano. He was also a presenter at numerous events and festivities associated with Almería, such as the patron festivals of the Casa de Almería in Barcelona, or the Christmas proclamation put on by the Ideal newspaper.

- 1991: Uva de Oro (Golden Grape), issued by the Casa de Almería and the Casa de la Alpujarra, Madrid.
- 1997: Special Plaque at the Casa de Almería's XVIII National Journalism Award, Barcelona.
- 2002: Homenaje a Manuel del Águila Ortega Homage to Manuel del Águila Ortega, volume of testimonies about Manuel del Águila published by the Institute of Almerian Studies.
- 2005: Gold Badge from the University of Almería.

Of note is the donation made by the family of Manuel del Águila, who gave over to the Institute for Almerian Studies Institute and the University of Almería, the composer's library consisting of 2,000 volumes, as well as instruments and personal items.
