= Almería Cathedral =

Roman Catholic cathedral in Almería, Spain

- Cathedral of the Incarnation
- Catedral de la Encarnación
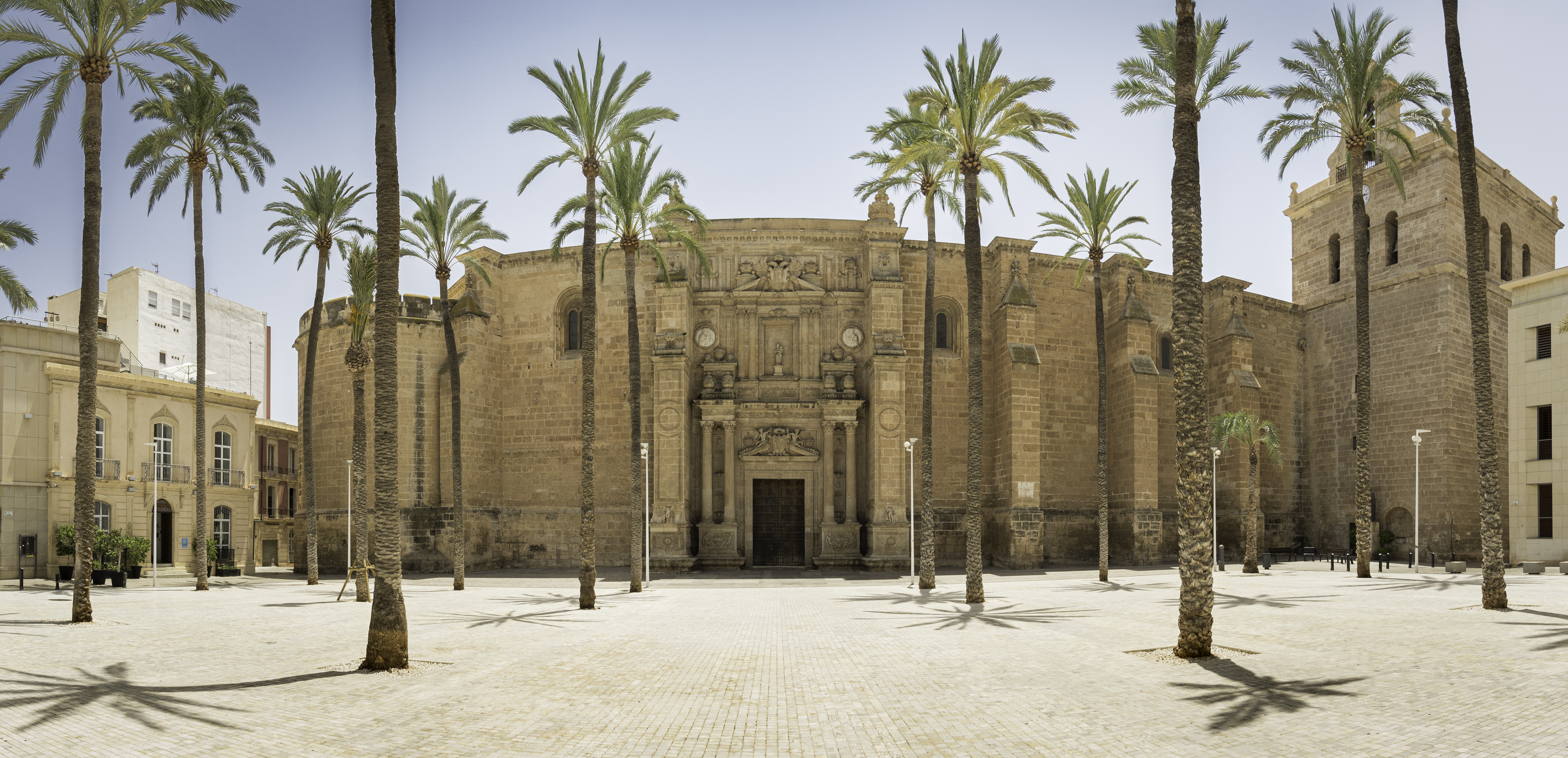
- Panoramic view of the North façade.
- Almería Cathedral
- 36.8387°N 2.4672°W
- Location: Almería
- Address: 8, Plaza de la Catedral
- Country: Spain
- Denomination: Catholic
- Website: catedralalmeria.com

History
- Status: Cathedral
- Dedication: Incarnation
- Dedicated: 1551

Architecture
- Architect: Juan de Orea
- Style: Gothic, Renaissance
- Years built: 1524—1562

Administration
- Metropolis: Granada
- Diocese: Almería

Clergy
- Bishop: Antonio Gómez Cantero

Spanish Cultural Heritage
- Type: Non-movable
- Criteria: Monument
- Designated: 3 June 1931
- Reference no.: RI-51-0000374

The Cathedral of Almería (Spanish: Catedral de Almería), in full the Cathedral of the Incarnation of Almería (Spanish: Catedral de la Encarnación de Almería), is a Roman Catholic cathedral in the city of Almería, Andalusia, Spain. It is the seat of the Roman Catholic Diocese of Almería.

== Description ==
The cathedral was built in the 16th century after an earthquake destroyed its predecessor. Its construction spans the period 1524 to 1562. It employs Gothic and Renaissance architectural styles as well as incorporating defensive features. Its last bell was built in 1805.

== Conservation ==
It is protected by the heritage listing Bien de Interés Cultural, having been declared as a Monumento histórico-artístico perteneciente al Tesoro Artístico Nacional by the decree of the June 3, 1931.

== Media interest ==
On March 21, 1969, the cathedral was used as a location for the American film Patton.

== Gallery ==
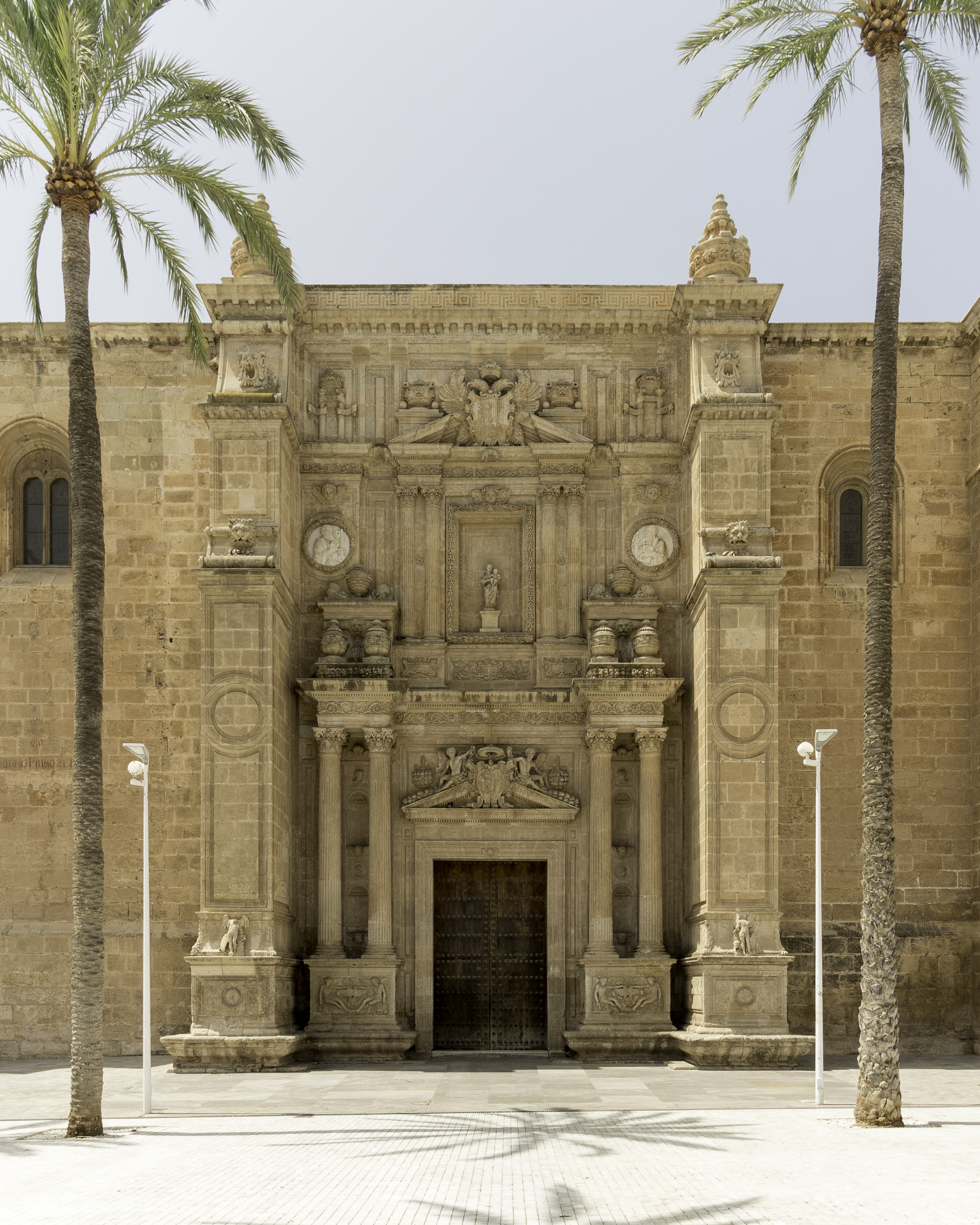
Main portal.

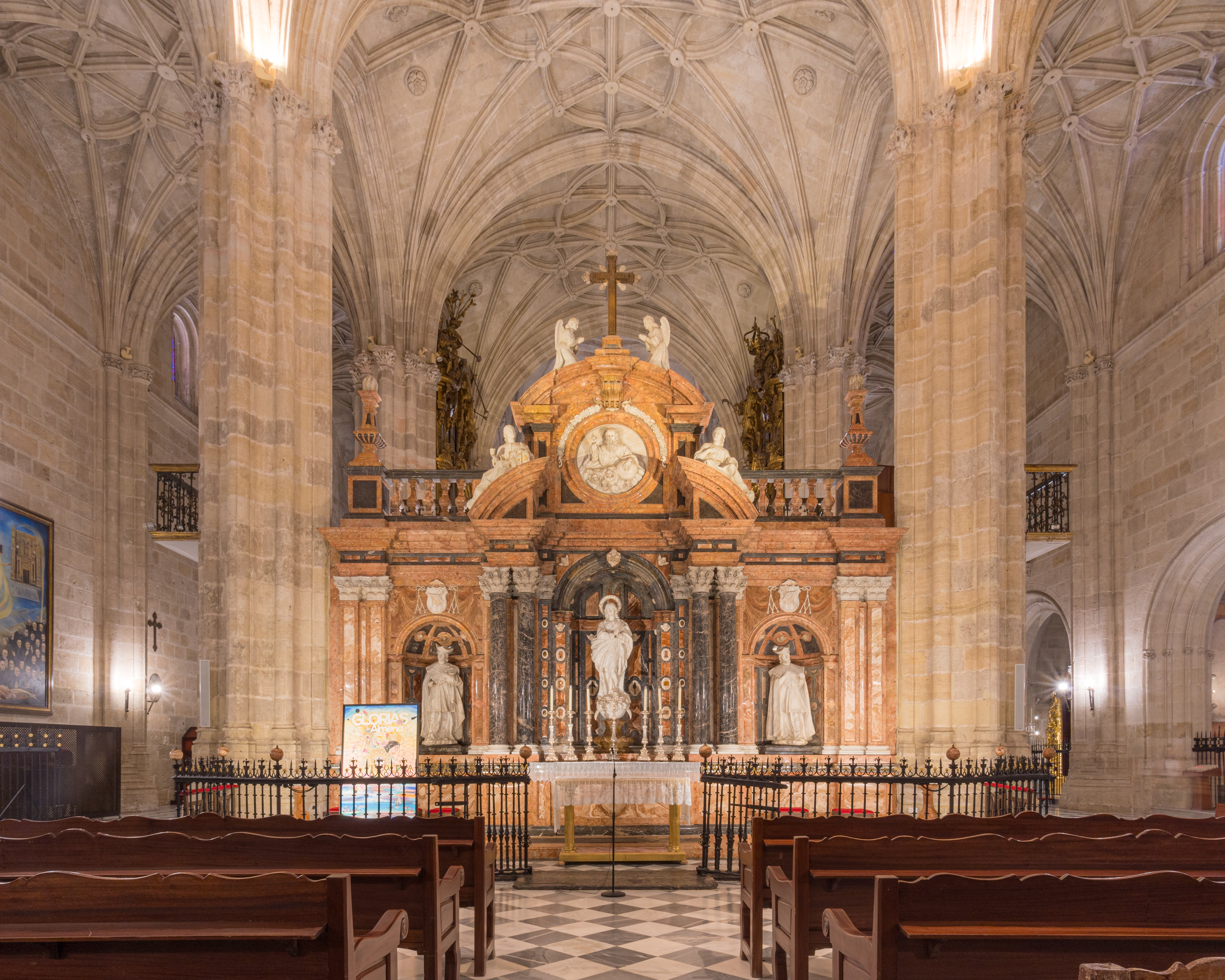
Retrochoir.

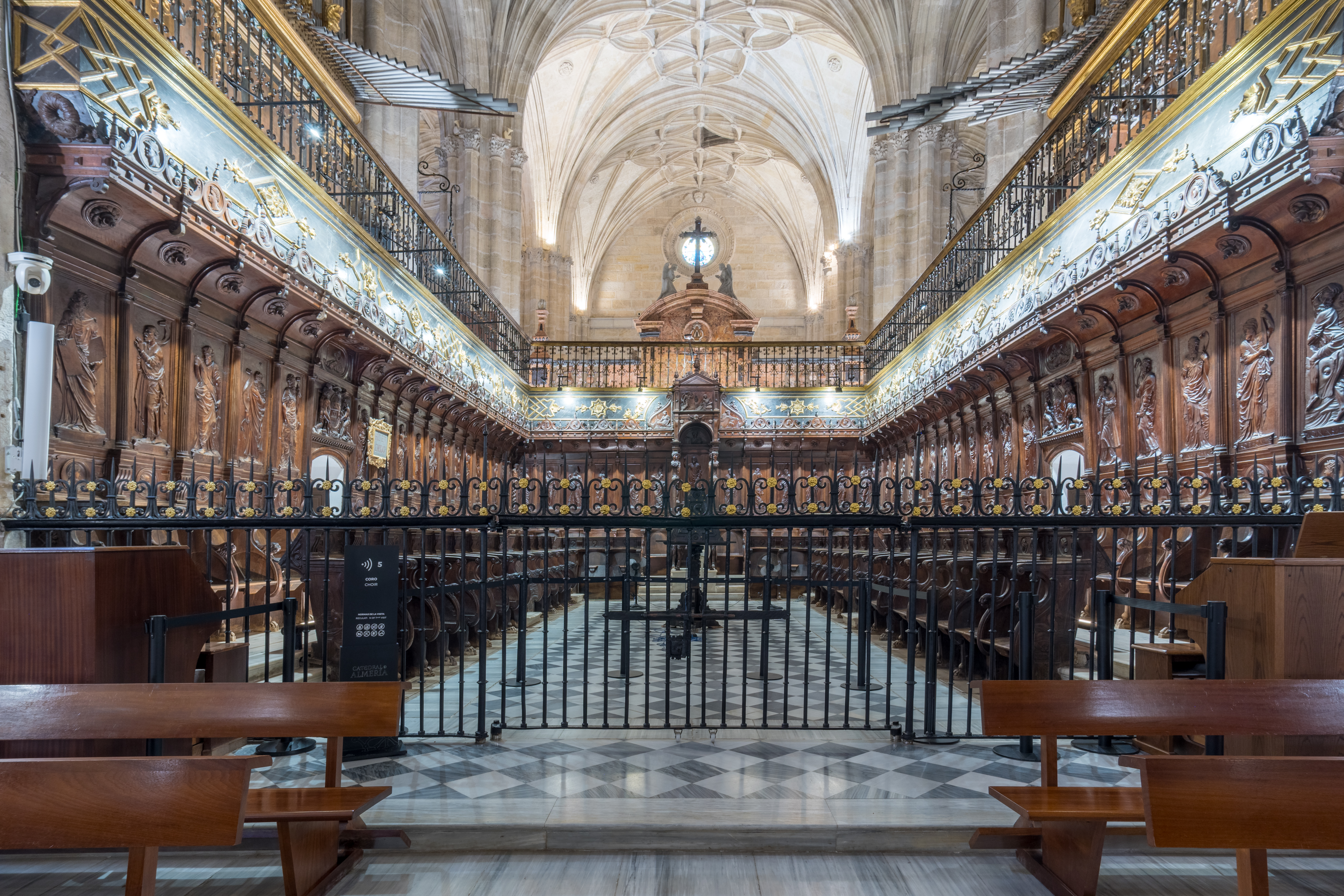
Choir.

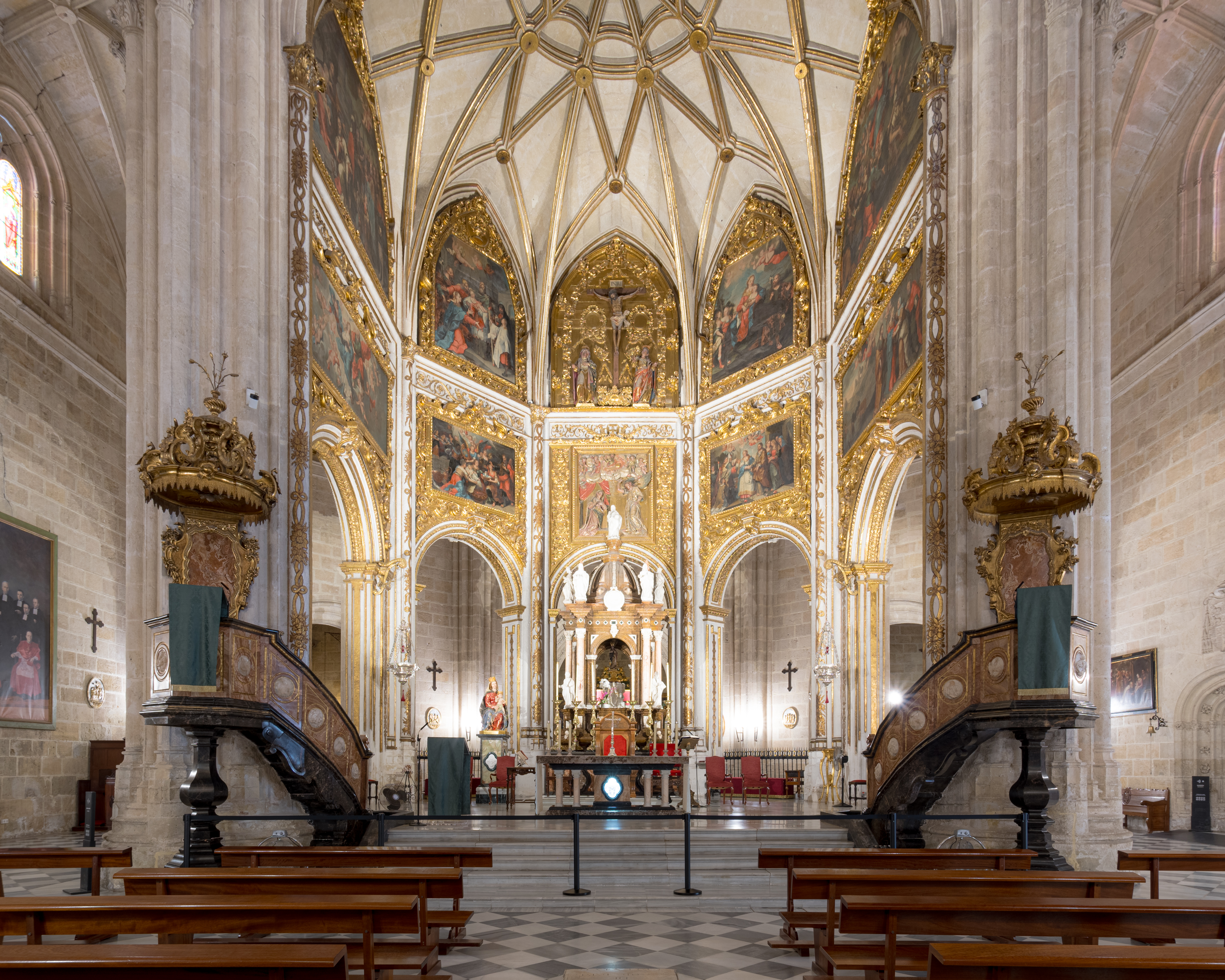
Main altar.

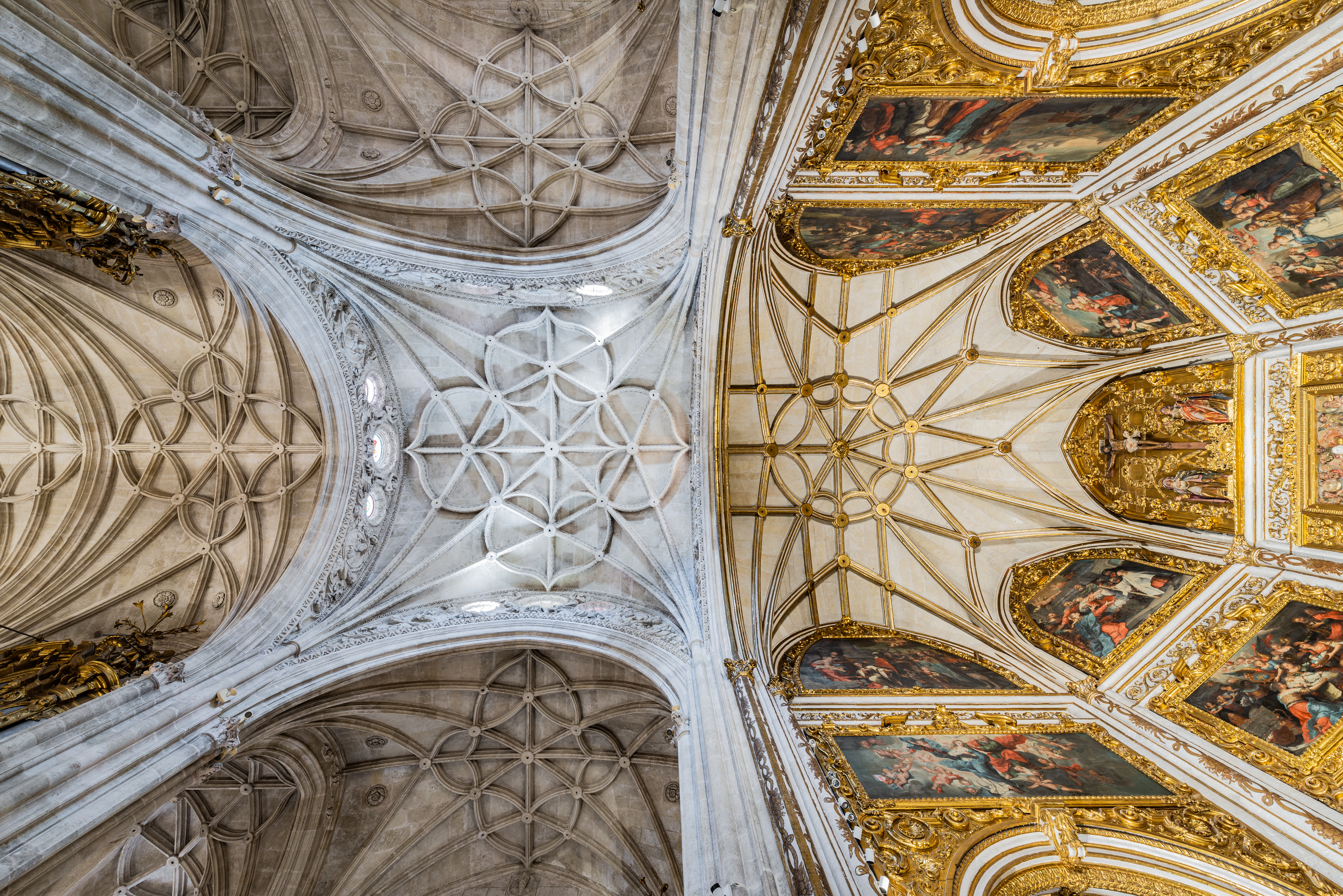
Ribbed vaults.

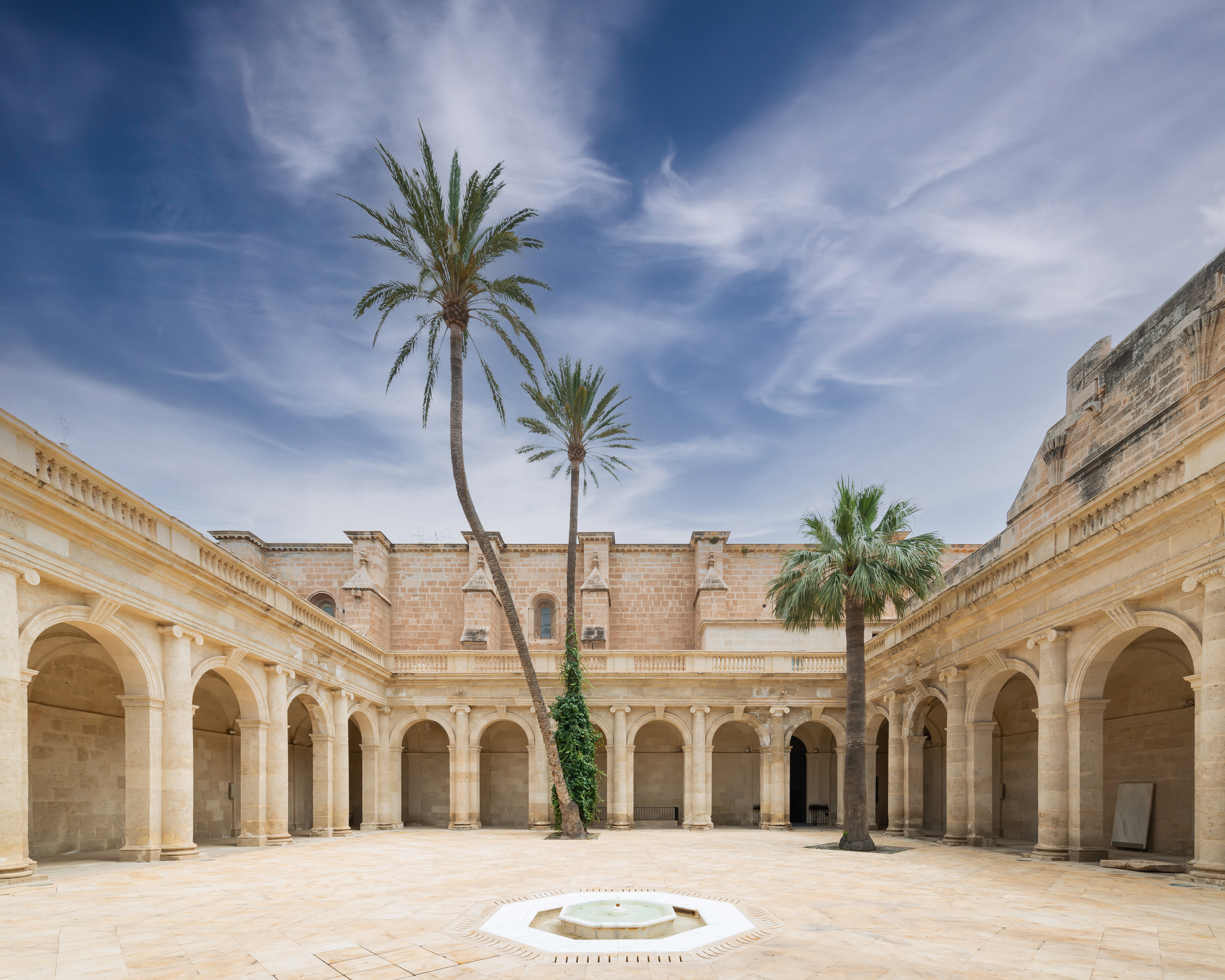
Cloister.
