= Barragán (surname) =

- Place of origin: Spain

Barragán, or Barragan in English-speaking countries, is a Spanish surname of Galician origins, from where they went to Extremadura, Spain, and even into Alentejo and Estremadura, in Portugal, where the surname was changed into Barragano, Barregano, Barregão, Barregoso, Barregosa (feminine), Varregoso, Varregosa (feminine).

It may refer to:

- Santos Saúl Álvarez Barragán (born 1990), Mexican Boxer
- Antonio Barragán (born 1987), Spanish footballer
- Bernabé Barragán (born 1993), Spanish footballer
- Claudio Barragán (born 1964), Spanish footballer
- Cuno Barragan (1932–2024), American baseball player
- Eduardo Barragán (born 1951), Colombian boxer
- Fernando Elizondo Barragán (born 1949), Mexican politician
- Gilberto Barragán Balderas (born 1970), Mexican drug lord
- Hernando Barragán (born 1974), Colombian interdisciplinary artist, designer, and academic
- Ismael Barragán (born 1986), Spanish footballer
- Javier Lozano Barragán (1933–2022), Mexican Roman Catholic cardinal
- Jonathan Barragán (born 1985), Spanish professional motocross racer
- Juan Carlos Barragán (born 1973), Mexican politician
- Julio Barragán (1928–2011), Argentine painter
- Luis Barragán (1902–1988), Mexican architect
- Luis Barragán (1914–2009), Argentine painter
- Luis Barragan (executive) (1971–2006), American businessman and philanthropist
- Luis Carlos Barragán (born 1988), Colombian science fiction writer and illustrator
- Martín Barragán (born 1991), Mexican professional footballer
- Martín Peláez Barragán, Leonese master of the Order of Santiago between 1217 and 1221
- Miguel Barragán (1790–1844), Mexican general and politician
- Nahuel Barragán (born 1996), Argentine footballer
- Nanette Barragán (born 1976), American politician
- Nieves Barragán Mohacho, Spanish chef
- Raúl Barragán (c. 1957–2013), Argentine hacker
- Rodolfo Barragán Schwarz (1931–2017), Mexican architect
- Santiago Barragán (born 1987), Spanish motorcycle racer

== See also ==
- Barragán family
