= Almoravid and Almohad textiles =

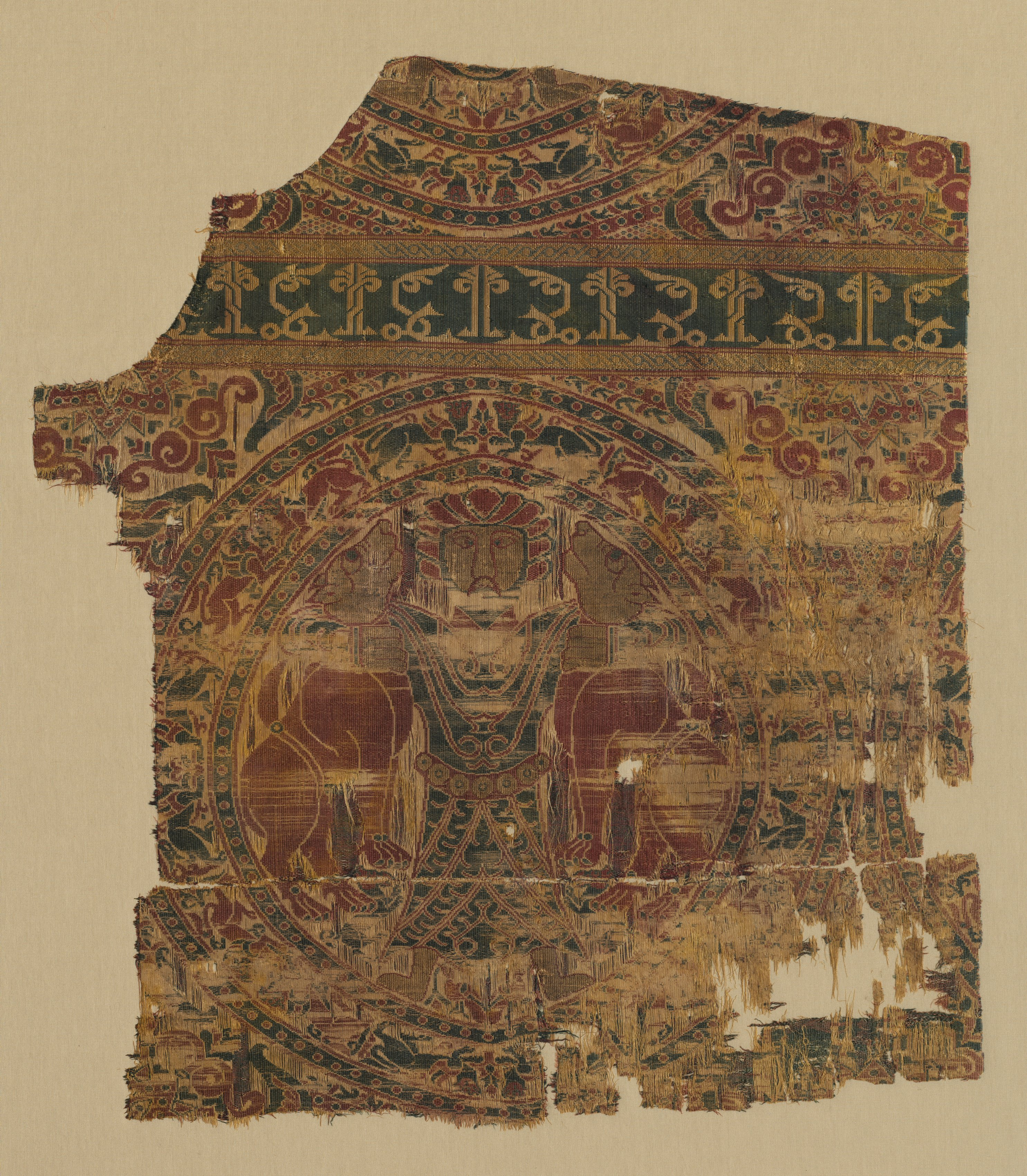
Lampas with lion strangler, from a dalmatic of Saint Bernard Calvo from the Almoravid period

Almoravid and Almohad textiles were produced within parts of northwest Africa and Spain between 1058 and 1269 CE under the Almoravid (1050s–1147) and Almohad (1147–1269) caliphates. Production in the Iberian Peninsula was first established under the Umayyad Caliphate, and it became centered in major cities such as Almería, Seville, and Málaga, each of which were home to Tirāz factories which produced silks and other textiles. These textiles were made in a wide range of techniques and styles, and the high quality and richness of the fabric lead to Iberian silks being highly sought after. Due to their valuable nature, Almohad and Almoravid textiles were spread throughout Europe, North Africa, and the Middle East through extensive trade routes.

== Origins and development ==
The basis for textile production and trade in al-Andalus was established with Tirāz factories that predated the Almoravids and Almohads in Almería and Seville, and other cities throughout Iberia. The first proof of silk production in the region was the establishment of a Tirāz weaving workshop in Córdoba under the reign of Umayyad Caliph 'Abd al-Rahmān II (ruled 821-852). The first evidence of drawlooms appears in the 11th century, with three silks found in the church of Saint Isidoro in León. Techniques such as the weaving of lampas silk arrived in al-Andalus from places like Baghdad around the beginning of the 12th century, and soon, those techniques were replicated in the Iberian peninsula.

During the beginning of the Almoravid period asceticism was preferred by the Almoravids, which can be seen in the architecture of their early reign. However, ‘Ali ibn Yusuf, 5th Emir, notably shifted away from earlier simplicity, and adopted the local Andalusian styles. This included Andalusian textiles, such as the chasuble of San Juan de Ortega at Quintanaortuña, which is a piece of Almohad weaving and an example of Almerían silk production that has been used to characterize other silks of the period, and bears his name in an inscription. The group of associated silks feature both floral and animal motifs, which appear throughout textiles from the period. Under Almoravid rule, textile production was further expanded into Málaga, which became known for its gold silk brocade, though Almería continued to be singled out as the leading location for trade and manufacturing. Approximately 800 silk workshops were noted within the city of Almería circa 1154 CE, which worked in different styles and types of silk textile.

The Almohads succeeded the Almoravids after destroying their empire and conquering Morocco and Islamic Spain over a period of three years from 1144 to 1147. Silk textiles for exportation continued to be produced at a rate similar to how they had been throughout the previous periods, but the rate produced for nobility within al-Andalus slowed. In the same locations, weaving patterns in the Almohad period showed a stylistic turn towards geometric design.

=== Trade and transmission ===
The Almoravids spanned across North Africa to al-Andalus, or Islamic Spain. This guaranteed them control of Trans-Saharan trade. Naturally, this facilitated the cultural exchange of ideas, materials, styles, and methods. This land continued to be a center of trade through to the Almohad dynasty. Almerían silks were particularly sought after by people from all over the world, and they drew many to the markets of Almería, which was the center of textile production.

The Almoravid dynasty’s expansion into al-Andalus around 1085 was the catalyst for the booming textile market that would soon come to be. The Almoravids brought styles and practices from North Africa, such as Egypt, to Spain, which collided and mixed to form a highly sought-after, high-quality product. Tirāz workshops were formed as part of the royal court of the Umayyad dynasty in Córdoba and are the first solid evidence of textile manufacture in the area. This textile manufacturing center eventually moved to Almería, and at the same time, power shifted from the Umayyads to the Almoravids. However, due to poor documentation, the origins of certain practices and styles are not firmly known. It is possible that settlers from Syria introduced the practice to al-Andalus. Byzantium textiles also influenced those in Almería due to proximity.

The weavers who set up shop in Andalusia were from many different parts of the Muslim world, so while the dynasty didn’t exactly bring an “Almoravid” style to the land, it financially supported the industry, as it was one of the primary sources of income for the area. Many of the silks produced, in fact, were made to imitate the quality and style of Baghdadi silks. These imitations were known as bagdadíes. However, a result of cultural exchange is the emergence of new styles, and such was the case with the Baghdadi imitations. Many considered the quality and style of Almerían silks to surpass those of Baghdad, and people in other areas of the world began to create imitations of the Almerían silks themselves. Almerían silks conveyed a sense of luxury and were prized across Europe, Asia, and Africa. Particular references to them can be found in many French sources wishing to emulate a luxurious setting. Merchants worldwide would arrive at the Almerían port by ship with luxury goods to trade in exchange for textiles, particularly silks.

The production of Almerían silks was threatened as the Almohad dynasty came into power in the area. The Almohad rulers were not keen on textiles, preferring a style of “simplicity”. Though they restricted the luxuriousness of fabrics their subjects wore, the production of silks did not halt in the area. This could be attributed to its financial importance and the all-encompassing cultural significance of textiles in the area. Though production was not halted, the style did change due to the preferences of the Almohad rulers.

== Function and uses ==
The textiles produced in Almería under the Almoravids served several functions. Primarily, they were decorative. The intricate nature of the textiles made it so they were usually not used in practical situations where they would become damaged or worn quickly; They were a luxury good. Textiles were made for dress, decorative tapestries, carpets, and more. Notably, they were an important symbol of social and political status as well as an outlet for artistic endeavors. At the head of the Almohad period, there was a decline in luxury textiles used for dress due to the Islamic principle of partaking in a simpler style of clothing preferred by the rulers. However, outside of the empire, luxury textiles and silks created in this region were still being adorned popularly across cultural and religious boundaries.

== Almerían silks ==
Luxury silk lampas produced in Almería during the Almoravid period, between 1100 and 1050

The city of Almería was a prominent hub of textile manufacturing during the Almoravid period. One of the largest cities in Andalusia, it flourished under Almoravid rule. Muslim cartographer Muhammad Al-Idrisi noted over 800 silk workshops producing a variety of styles. Almerían silks were renowned for their luxury within contemporary French and German literature, and the city’s location allowed it to take advantage of Mediterranean trade and the Almoravid dynasty’s internal trade networks. Some of the varieties of silks produced in the city mimicked styles from Baghdad and Isfahan, showing a broad cross-pollination in textile manufacturing techniques between the Islamic world. After a siege of the city by the Kingdom of Castile in 1147, the city’s prominence declined, but it remained a center of trade into the Almohad period.

The silk goods produced included luxury fabrics and brocades called "dihaj" and "siqlatun" respectively, silk threads, curtains and netting, striped silks called "attabi", knotted silks called "muajar", silks of Isfahani style and more. At the height of Almoravid prosperity, in the 12th century, imitations of Baghdadi silks were especially prized, of which the shroud of San Pedro de Osma is a notable example.

Almería was, along with Córdoba, Málaga, and Seville, one of the centers of silk weaving crafts mentioned most frequently by the writers Ibn Hawkal, Yakut, and Makkari.

== Tirāz factories ==
Tirāz factory manufacturing of luxury fabrics dates back to the middle of the eighth century following Muslim conquest of Spain. Originally established in Córdoba, the Dar al-Tirāz, royal workshop, initially signaled Córdoba as the primary textile power in al-Andalus. Following the installation of the Almoravids, however, the textile industry and Dar al-Tirāz shifted to Almería. Almería was an important port as it allowed for greater trade between other Mediterranean empires. At the Almerían port, “ships arrived loaded with exotic merchandise and departed full of silks, ceramics, marbles and other luxury objects." Luxury textile production existed within the Dar al-Tirāz and in private workshops. Almería’s eight hundred workshops made fine thread, richly woven fabrics, and brocades for those in high position in Almoravid society, like caliphs and emirs, and the many delegations of representatives visiting al-Andalus.

The downfall of the Almoravid empire represented a great change for the textile industry in al-Andalus. The Almohads’ initial rejection of the textile industry defines most scholarship on the textile transition between empires. Abu Yusuf Yaqub al-Mansur, a caliph of the Almohad empire, commanded the sale of many textiles held in tirāz and prohibited luxurious garments, including women’s embroidered gowns. Many scholars believe that the Almohads halted textile production in alignment with religious beliefs of “piety and simplicity” that “[glorified] the word of God as its primary aim." Recently, however, scholars such as Laura Rodríguez Peinado have suggested that the halt in textile production “could have been due to the hatred that the Almohads showed for their predecessors, the Almoravids." In small, private workshops, the production and exportation of luxury textiles continued, maintaining Almería’s wealth. Textile production slowly picked back up under later Almohad rule, never reaching its former renown, but still developing a new, distinctive Almohad design, notably with fewer figural motifs.

== Major examples ==
=== Almoravid pieces ===
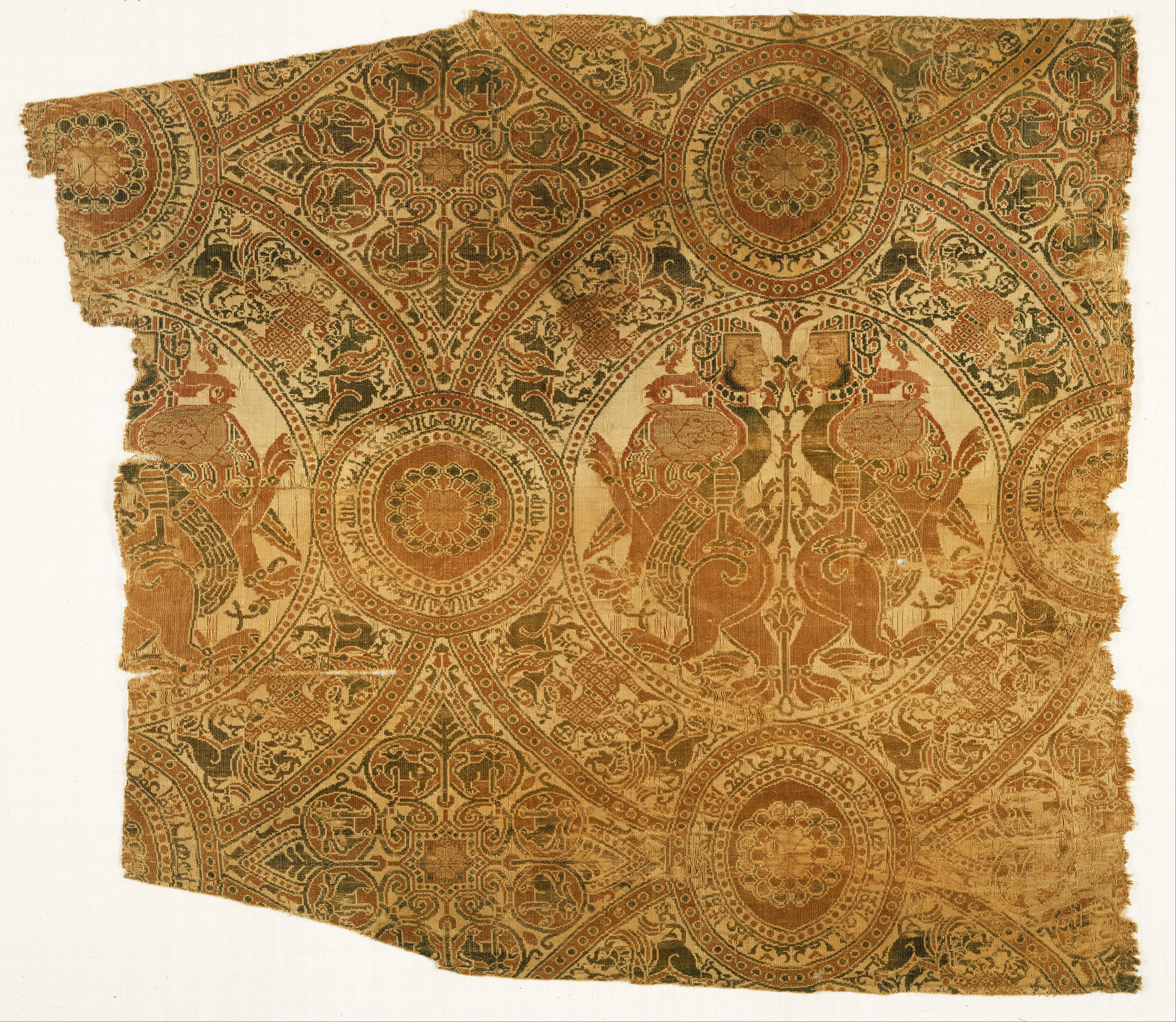
Fragment of the shroud of San Pedro de Osma, with wrestling lions and harpies, early 12 century, Almoravid

Many of the remaining fabrics from the Almoravid period were reused by Christians, with examples in the reliquary of San Isidoro in León, a chasuble from Saint-Sernin in Toulouse, the Chasuble of San Juan de Ortega in the church of Quintanaortuña (near Burgos), the shroud of San Pedro de Osma, a tunic found in the tomb of Infante Don García (son of Alfonso VII), and a fragment found at the church of Thuir in the eastern Pyrenees.

The Shroud of San Pedro de Osma is notable for its inscription stating "this was made in Baghdad", suggesting that it was imported. As a result of the inscription, many of these textiles are known in scholarship as the "Baghdad group", representing a stylistically coherent and artistically rich group of silken textiles seemingly dating to reign of Ali ibn Yusuf or the first half of the 12th century. More recent scholarship has suggested that the shroud was instead produced locally in centres such as Almeria, but that they were copied or based on eastern imports. It is even possible that the inscription was knowingly falsified in order to exaggerate its value to potential sellers. Al-Saqati of Málaga, a 12th-century writer and market inspector, wrote that there were regulations designed to prohibit the practice of making such false inscriptions.

=== Las Navas de Tolosa Banner ===
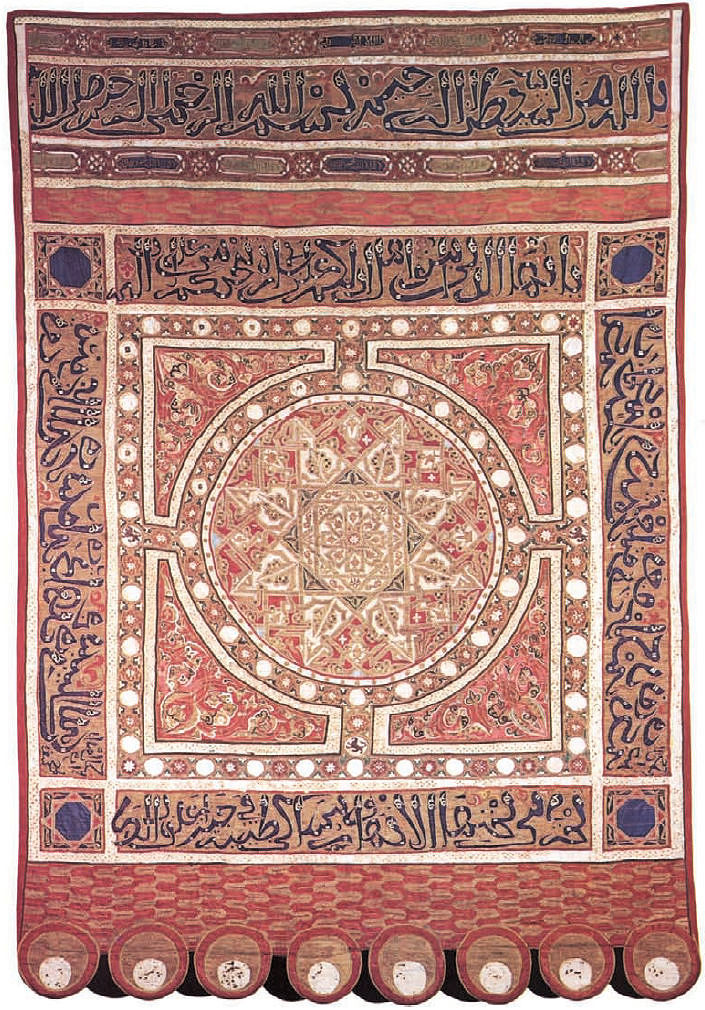
"Banner of the Moors" or "Las Navas de Tolosa," traditionally attributed to the Almohad period but possibly from a later period

One of the best-known textiles traditionally attributed to the Almohads is the "Las Navas de Tolosa Banner", so-called because it was once thought to be a spoil won by Alfonso VIII at the Battle of Las Navas de Tolosa in 1212. More recent studies have proposed that it was actually a spoil won some years later by Ferdinand III. The banner was then donated to the Monastery of Santa Maria la Real de Huelgas in Burgos, where it remains today. The banner is richly designed and features blue Arabic inscriptions and white decorative patterns on a red background. The central motif features an eight-pointed star framed by a circle inside a larger square, with smaller motifs filling the bands of the frame and the corner spaces. This central design is surrounded on four sides by Arabic inscriptions in Naskhi script featuring Qur'anic verses (Surah 61: 10–12), and another horizontal inscription in the banner's upper part which praises God and Muhammad. Recent studies have argued that the banner is of 14th century origin rather than of Almohad origin, due to its similarities with captured Marinid banners kept at the Cathedral of Toledo and to its similarities with Nasrid motifs. It remains uncertain whether it was crafted either in Fez under the Marinids or in Granada under the Nasrids.

== Iconography ==
=== Almoravid iconography ===
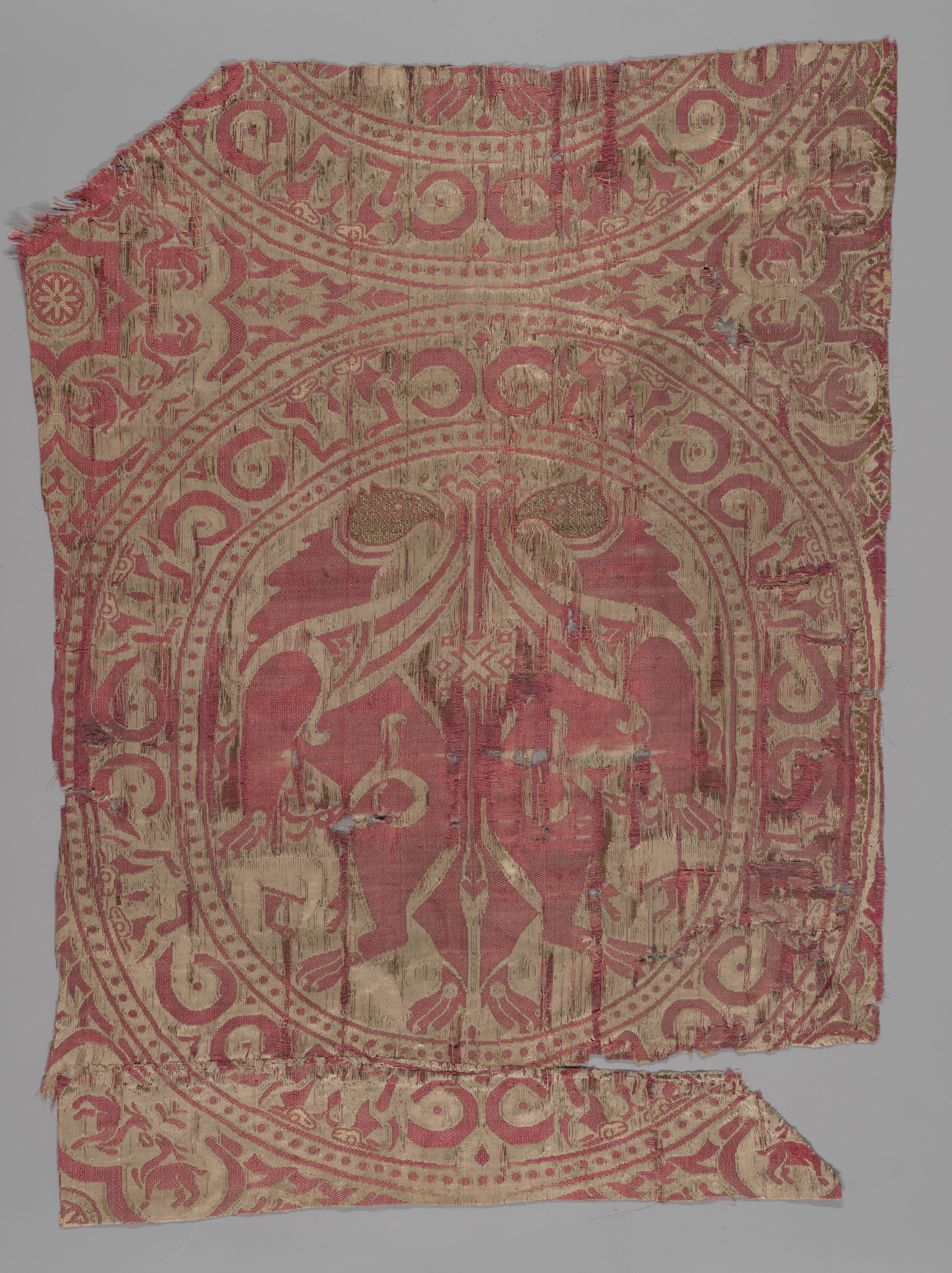
Textile Fragment from the Shrine of San Librada, Sigüenza Cathedral, dated to the first half of the 12th century during Almoravid rule.

Almoravid textiles were renowned for their precise technique and figural style, influenced by Iraqi and Persian silks. Almoravid design features large rondels “with ribbons of pearling…disposed in rows and enclosing pairs of animals,” often mythological, such as griffins and harpies, or grand, such as peacocks and eagles. These animals either face each other in confrontation or are addorsed (back-to-back). Sometimes, rondels featured human figures, like in the Chasuble of Saint Thomas Becket. The decorative theme of having a regular grid of roundels containing images of animals and figures, with more abstract motifs filling the spaces in between, has origins traced as far back as Persian Sasanian textiles. In subsequent periods, starting with the Almohads, these roundels with figurative imagery are progressively replaced with more abstract roundels, while epigraphic decoration becomes more prominent than before.

The "Baghad group" textiles (also discussed above) typically employ a "dull orange-red" colour for decorative motifs, occasionally highlighted with gold, or green and blue colours against an "ivory" background. Some of these pieces are characterized by the appearance of Kufic or "Hispano-Kufic" woven inscriptions, with letters sometimes ending in ornamental vegetal flourishes. The Chasuble of San Juan de Ortega is one such example, made of silk and gold thread and dating to the first half of the 12th century. Aside from its inscription, the Shroud of San Pedro de Osma is also decorated with images of two lions and harpies inside roundels that are ringed by images of small men holding griffins, repeating across the whole fabric. The chasuble from Saint-Sernin is likewise decorated with figural images, in this case a pair of peacocks repeating in horizontal bands, with vegetal stems separating each pair and small kufic inscriptions running along the bottom.

=== Almohad iconography ===
Almohad textiles deviated greatly from Almoravid textiles. The rigorous production found during Almoravid rein slowed as the Almohads took power and halted production in the Dar al-Tirāz. Although textiles continued to be produced in private workshops and Almohad rulers eventually became less strict about luxury textiles, the number of textiles produced during Almohad rule was much fewer. Widespread warfare throughout the region as the Almohads took power also negatively impacted production.

Design under Almohad rule is noticeably simpler. Rather than depicting figures in large rondels, Almohad textiles were defined by use of geometric patterns, vegetative imagery, and Kufic or cursive script. Almohad textiles were “aniconic, glorifying the word of God as [their] primary aim." Recent scholars have pointed out that the Fatimid, Syrian, and Iranian textiles that Almoravid textiles took inspiration from also had great shifts in style, suggesting that Andalusian tirāz adjusted both to Almohad aniconism and to “new models from Central Asia." Some textiles implement techniques that make the textile design look “flat…as much for the background as for the ornamentation,” often understating Andalusia’s established silk so it is only used for binding. Only designs made with gold thread stand out. The overall effect is one of understatement, even with luxurious materials. Densely packed design such as this has been argued to demonstrate that much of Almohad design “came from the East, and does not respond to a strictly local phenomenon.”

== See also ==
- Armazine
- Barragan (cloth)
