= Corruption in Argentina =

Corruption in Argentina remains a serious problem. Argentina has long suffered from widespread and endemic corruption. Corruption remains a serious problem in the public and private sector even though the legal and institutional framework combating corruption is strong in Argentina.

A 1996 article in The New York Times noted that "payoffs, kickbacks and government corruption are considered part of everyday life" in Argentina. Bribery and fraud are also found common among the private sector, and the lack of transparency in government regulations and laws has triggered an increased uncertainty among investors.

The Financial Action Task Force removed Argentina from its "gray list" in October 2014, noting significant progress made by the country in improving its legislation and procedures against money laundering and illicit financing.

== Extent ==
In Transparency International's 2025 Corruption Perceptions Index, Argentina scored 36 on a scale from 0 ("highly corrupt") to 100 ("very clean"). When ranked by score, Argentina ranked 104th among the 182 countries in the Index, where the country ranked first is perceived to have the most honest public sector. For comparison with regional scores, the best score among the countries of the Americas (Note: Argentina, Bahamas, Barbados, Belize, Bolivia, Brazil, Canada, Chile, Colombia, Costa Rica, Cuba, Dominica, Dominican Republic, Ecuador, El Salvador, Grenada, Guatemala, Guyana, Haiti, Honduras, Jamaica, Mexico, Nicaragua, Panama, Paraguay, Peru, Saint Lucia, Saint Vincent and the Grenadines, Suriname, Trinidad and Tobago, United States of America, Uruguay, Venezuela) was 75, the average score was 42 and the worst score was 10. For comparison with worldwide scores, the best score was 89 (ranked 1), the average score was 42, and the worst score was 9 (ranked 181, in a two-way tie). Comparing the 2020 and 2021 Corruption Perception Indexes, Transparency International wrote of the Americas region that "Dropping four points compared to last year, Argentina (38) is the country in the region that has declined the most. Interference in the judiciary by political authorities is jeopardising the country’s independence and creating an impression of impunity. 2021 was also characterised by abuses of power during the pandemic: the discretionary vaccination scheme (VIP vaccination) for public officials and their cronies, non-transparent procurement and contracting, and unethical behaviour by government officials."

The Financial Times noted in 2013 that in Argentina corruption is widely considered to be "engrained", and "there is the sense that public officials are untouchable". In May 2013, sociologist Atilio Borón lamented that "the Argentinian is very accustomed to the idea that governments are corrupt, and does not seem shocked at acts of corruption," and that the corruption of politicians therefore does not prevent their reelection. "This is an economy that for the past 20 years has tolerated a legal drain of over 160 billion dollars," he added, "and this is now coming to take its revenge." A CIPCE (Center for the Investigation and Prevention of Economic Crimes) study concluded that public sector corruption alone cost the national treasury around US$10 billion from 1980 to 2006.

A major Argentine newspaper, La Nación, editorialized in October 2013 that although corruption has been a major problem in Argentina since the 1890s, it has been "on the increase" since the 1990s.

Diplomatic cables leaked in 2011 revealed that diplomats from the United States and several other Western countries had expressed deep concern about the current levels of corruption in Argentina. "Under President Cristina Fernández de Kirchner," reported The Heritage Foundation in 2013, "respect for markets and the rule of law has deteriorated and corruption has boomed."

According to Transparency International, Argentina has sufficient legislation and institutions dedicated to the prosecution of corruption in the public sector, but enforcement is highly inadequate, with the result that "impunity continues to trump integrity."

== History ==
There is a long history of serious corruption in Argentina. "Ever since independence, almost 200 years ago Argentina's foreign debt has been a source of impoverishment and corruption and the biggest scandals." Likewise, rumors or allegations of corruption have frequently been publicized by feuding political figures or factions in Argentina by way of undermining rivals.

=== Baring Brothers incident ===
The earliest major episode in the history of corruption in Argentina began with an 1824 loan from the British banking house Baring Brothers, which was "the leader in financing Argentina's economic development for upwards of sixty years and the major issuer of that country's loans," with Baring Brothers' Argentine loans totaling £19.2 million by the late 1880s (nearly US$100 million). In August 1888, however, Baring Brothers was unable to place £10 million of shares and debentures in Buenos Aires Water Supply & Drainage Company, a firm that was "denounced as a feeding trough for corrupt politicians and rapacious foreign capitalists."

Baring Brothers' inability to dispose of these and other Argentinian holdings placed the firm in acute distress, forcing the Bank of England to arrange a rescue in which J.P. Morgan & Co. played the major role. The Baring Brothers episode was an important chapter not only in the history of Argentinian economics but also in the history of the global stock market. According to one source, "scandals surrounding corruption claims in connection with the loan damaged both Buenos Aires and London."

=== Miguel Juárez Celman ===
President Miguel Juárez Celman, who was in office from 1886 to 1890, came to the presidency as a result of electoral fraud. Through a policy known as "Unicato," Juárez Celman, who opposed universal suffrage and considered it to be always an error "to consult the people," assumed total power in Argentina, bringing together the forces of business and politics in ways that enabled both to profit at the expense of the state treasury. An English newspaper of the time is quoted as describing Argentine corruption as follows: "Today there are dozens of men in government who are publicly accused of malpractice, who in any civilized country would be quickly punished with imprisonment, and yet none of them have been brought to justice. Meanwhile Celman is at liberty to enjoy the comfort of his farm and no one thinks to punish him." Juárez Celman was, however, eventually removed from office in the Revolution of 1890, amid allegations of corruption.

=== The Infamous Decade ===
The period between 1930 and 1943, starting when General José Félix Uriburu came to power in the 1930 coup, was known as the Infamous Decade owing to the high degree of corruption involving business, and both the ruling Concordance party and its opponents. This period was marked by electoral fraud, persecution of political opponents, and government corruption generally. The key scandal of the era centered on CHADE (Companía Hispano Argentina de Electricidad), a supplier of electricity, whose bribery of officials was so transparent that the recipients of the bribes were known as "chadístas." Another widely reported case at the time was that of the President (Speaker) of the Argentine Chamber of Deputies, Juan Kaiser, who resigned in 1940 following revelations that he had profited from the sale of 23 hectares (57 acres) of Army land in the upscale Buenos Aires suburb of El Palomar.

=== "Prosecutor of the Nation" ===
Lisandro de la Torre, who was a Senator in the 1930s, earned the nickname "Prosecutor of the Nation" for the investigation into the corruption-ridden Argentine beef trade that he spearheaded in 1935. During the investigation, a disciple of de la Torre's, Enzo Bordabehere, was murdered by Ramón Váldez Cora, who was believed to have been out to kill de la Torre himself.

=== Juan Perón ===
Brink Lindsey of The Wall Street Journal noted that before Perón took power (Perón ruled Argentina from 1946 to 1955, and then again from 1973 to 1974), Argentina's Supreme Court justices experienced little political tampering, and that "at the beginning of Perón's first administration in 1946, Supreme Court justices averaged 12 years on the bench."

Since 1946, wrote Lindsey, "It's been downhill," with the Supreme Court "reduced to a puppet of executive power." In 1950, writes one source, "Argentina's postwar export boom tapered off, and inflation and corruption grew." Perón was overthrown in September 1955 by a military coup; but while around 2,000 Peronist officials were detained, only 167 were charged with any crime (corruption or otherwise) despite confessions extracted under duress, and ultimately none were convicted.

One of Perón's salient legacies was the rise of the CGT labor federation, which remained among the nation's most powerful institutions even after his overthrow. The CGT diversified their growing resources through investment banking via the Banco Sindical, captive insurance, and real estate, such that by 1965 union dues accounted for only a third of the CGT's income. While these profits financed an array of generous benefits for the rank-and-file, a thriving balance sheet also increasingly engendered corruption among union leaders. Many solicited bribes from employers using the threat of strike action and one – Commercial Union leader Armando March – was convicted in 1969 of embezzling up to US$30 million from his union's accounts over the course of the decade.

=== Isabel Perón and the Triple A ===
Perón returned to Argentina in 1973 and died in office a year later. His widow and successor, Isabel Perón, was ousted in a March 1976 coup amid mounting political and economic chaos as well as congressional investigations into embezzlement charges of her own. She was indicted two months after the coup for the use in 1975 of around a million dollars from the Cruzada de Solidaridad charity fund to settle a probate dispute with the late Eva Duarte's family.

The Argentine Anticommunist Alliance (Triple A) death squad, which claimed 1,100 to 2,000 lives, reached the height of its influence during Mrs. Perón's tenure. Organized in 1973 by Perón's secretary, José López Rega, it was largely financed by funds embezzled from the Ministry of Social Welfare (to which López Rega was appointed Minister). Some Triple A squad leaders – notably Rodolfo Almirón, Aníbal Gordon, and Raúl Guglielminetti – perpetrated numerous high-profile ransom kidnappings in subsequent years with the cooperation of both criminal gangs such as the Puccio family and rogue elements in the police and intelligence services.

=== Montoneros and David Graiver ===
The Triple A's chief nemesis at the time, the far-left terrorist group Montoneros, claimed up to 1,000 lives from 1970 until their elimination in 1976. They also perpetrated a number of high-profile ransom kidnappings, notably that of Jorge and Juan Born in September 1974. The Born brothers, directors of what was then one of Argentina's largest conglomerates (Bunge y Born) paid US$60 million for their release in June 1975, a world record at the time. At least US$14 million of these proceeds were laundered by David Graiver, a real-estate developer. Graiver fled Argentina in 1975 and settled in Manhattan, from where he bought controlling stake in a variety of banks in the U.S. and elsewhere. He reportedly died in a plane crash near Acapulco in August 1976, however, leaving US$45 million in bad debts that resulted in the collapse of American Bank & Trust – at the time the 4th largest bank failure in U.S. history. District Attorney Robert Morgenthau was skeptical that Graiver died in the crash, and indicted Graiver for the failure of American Bank & Trust; Graiver's banks in Argentina and elsewhere also failed. New York Judge Arnold Fraiman ultimately ruled in January 1979 that Graiver was deceased, although he did so with reservations.

=== Military junta ===
Argentina was subsequently ruled for seven years by a right-wing dictatorship that oversaw a reign of terror. General Jorge Videla, who was dictator of Argentina from 1976 to 1981, presided over most of the Dirty War abuses, including extensive kidnapping and torture, thousands of forced disappearances, the murders of some 13,000 to 30,000 dissidents and political enemies and their families at secret detention camps, and the kidnapping and sale of around 500 babies born at the camps. Their property was often seized without due process via an agency created for the purpose known as CONAREPA (National Reparations Commission), which had liquidated an estimated US$200 million in absconded valuables by the time it was dissolved in 1983.

The Dirty War likewise served as cover for numerous ransom kidnappings, which continued even after the return of democracy in 1983 at the hand of a number of the same officers. The Director of Battalion 601, the Army Intelligence unit where most of these ransom kidnappings originated, was the hard-line General Guillermo Suárez Mason. His appointment as head of YPF in 1981 was followed by a period of severe mismanagement at the state oil concern. He installed many of his hard-line Army Intelligence colleagues in managerial posts, and they in turn diverted large quantities of fuel into the director's newly established company Sol Petróleo – a dummy corporation used by Suárez Mason and his appointees for embezzlement as well as to divert funds to the Contras and the fascist organization P2 (to which Suárez Mason belonged). YPF debts thus rose 142-fold during Suárez Mason's tenure, at the end of which in 1983 the company recorded a US$6 billion loss.

The 1976 coup ushered in what would become the costliest, most consequential wave of corruption in Argentina up to that point. The Economy Minister during most of the dictatorship, José Alfredo Martínez de Hoz, advanced twin anti-labor and financial deregulation policies that interrupted industrial development and upward social mobility while sharply increasing the nation's debt burden. Industrial output thus fell by 20%, real wages by at least 36%, and the public debt soared from US$8 billion to US$45 billion; by 1983, interest charges alone reached US$6.5 billion, creating a balance of payments crisis that weakened the economy for years.

While chronic budget deficits (exacerbated during the dictatorship by growing tax evasion and military spending) accounted for around half the new debt, the remainder originated in banking deregulation enacted in 1977 and in a crawling peg enacted in 1978 that by 1980 made the peso one of the most overvalued currencies in the world. At least US$20 billion borrowed by private parties from foreign banks in just two years were wired to offshore banks by 1981, around US$15 billion of which was absorbed into the public debt the following year. The total cost of these bailouts rose to US$23 billion by the time they were curtailed in 1985. These costs included bailouts for two firms in which Martínez de Hoz was the chief shareholder: the insolvent CIADE electric utility (US$395 million) and steel maker Acindar (US$649 million). At least one Martínez de Hoz subordinate who objected to the CIADE bailout (Juan Carlos Casariego) joined the ranks of the disappeared in 1977.

Following Judge Norberto Oyarbide's repeal in 2006 of the immunity that had shielded civilian officials in the dictatorship from prosecution (Martínez de Hoz was the highest ranking such civilian), the former Economy Minister was formally charged with ordering the extortion kidnapping of textile industrialists Federico and Miguel Gutheim in 1976, and banker Eduardo Saiegh in 1981. Martínez de Hoz returned to the world of banking in later years, and was fined US$5 million for his role in the US$170 million Banco General de Negocios failure in 2002. He was placed under house arrest in 2010, and died in 2013.

The dictatorship eventually called elections and stepped down, though not before further damaging Argentina's international standing with the disastrous Falklands War in 1982. The war itself became a backdrop for corruption when, at the height of the brief conflict in May 1982, a Patriotic Fund was organized for the benefit of the underequipped troops at the Falklands front. The May 9 Public Television telethon and other fundraising efforts yielded US$54 million in donations (including 141 kilograms (311 lb) in gold) by the time the Argentine military surrendered five weeks later. Most donations never served their intended purpose, however: the cash and gold were mostly used by the Central Bank to offset the cost of the war; food and clothing donations were impeded from reaching the troops by the fighting; and a sizable percentage would remain unaccounted for. The only donor who successfully sued to recover his donation (vintner Renato Vaschetti) found that the three kilos of gold returned to him in 1984 had been stamped by a Swiss bank.

Videla, convicted of homicides, kidnapping, torture, and other crimes, was sentenced to life in prison, was pardoned by President Menem in 1990. Menem's pardon was ruled unconstitutional on President Néstor Kirchner's initiative in 2006. Videla returned to prison in 2012, where he died the next year.

=== Raúl Alfonsín ===
Although Raúl Alfonsín, who was president from 1983 to 1989, won international recognition for human rights reforms, for initiating the Trial of the Juntas in 1985, and for fighting corruption, Argentine business and government continued to be marked by severe corruption during his period in office. The Central Bank was defrauded in 1986 by Banco Alas (the 13th largest in Argentina at the time) for US$110 million in export credits; and Alfonsín's National Customs Director, Juan Carlos Delconte, was sentenced to 10 years in prison in 1998 for aggravated smuggling a decade after it was discovered that he had been running a secret "parallel customs" system.

=== Carlos Menem ===
Corruption allegations "swirled" throughout Carlos Menem's two terms as president (1989–99). Menem reportedly "used the resources coming from privatizations to strengthen his inner circle and the Perónist corrupt clientelistic machine working at provincial levels." He "allowed provincial and local governments to contract loans, contributing thus to an increase in the national debt that would contribute to the severe financial crisis years later, prompting the downfall of President De La Rúa."

==== Swiftgate (1990) ====
When the U.S. Ambassador to Argentina, Terence Todman, informed the Argentine government in 1990 that Menem advisor and in-law Emir Yoma had solicited a bribe from Swift, the U.S. meat packing firm, it led to a scandal known as Swiftgate. The scandal resulted in the resignations of Yoma, Economy Minister Antonio Érman González, and other officials in January 1991. The whistleblower, economist Guillermo Nielsen, had to move to Uruguay as a result of threats.

==== Yomagate (1991) ====
A cocaine trafficking operation revealed in 1991 involved the shipment of large sums of drug money from New York City to Argentina, where it was laundered through the purchase of real estate, jewelry, or businesses, or diverted to Uruguay. Amira Yoma, who was at the center of the scandal, was Menem's secretary and sister-in-law, and was eventually cleared of all charges.

==== Domingo Cavallo and Alfredo Yabrán ====
Menem's Finance Minister, Domingo Cavallo, "built his reputation on fighting corruption inside Government agencies and privatized industries," reported The New York Times in 1996. As a result, he was "unpopular within the Government" and "sparred publicly" with Menem.

Cavallo accused businessman Alfredo Yabrán in 1995 of being a sort of mafia boss who enjoyed political and judicial protection, who covertly ran several major transport and security companies including Correo OCA (which handled 30% of the Argentine postal market), and whose firms were involved in drugs and weapons trafficking and money laundering. After José Luis Cabezas, a photojournalist who was investigating Yabrán, was murdered in 1997, it was shown that Yabrán had connections at the highest levels of government and had bought Menem a mansion. Yabrán was found dead in 1998, a supposed suicide – although some observers questioned whether he had in fact killed himself, and some raised doubts as to whether the body was even his. However, there have been no sighting reports, and the DNA testings on the corpse confirmed that it was Yabrán.

==== María Julia Alsogaray ====
María Julia Alsogaray, the daughter of prominent conservative politician Álvaro Alsogaray, was appointed by Menem to oversee a number of the privatizations carried out from 1989 to 1991. Her role in these negotiations resulted in the sale of these state firms for a fraction of their stated book value.

Alsogaray's tenure at Environment Secretariat, which was elevated to a cabinet-level post by the president in 1991, was also marked by a number of scandals. These included bid rigging for the refurbishment of the Haedo Palace (the secretariart's headquarters) and, particularly, of a 1993 plan to decontaminate the Riachuelo (a heavily polluted waterway along Buenos Aires' industrial southside). Alsogaray obtained a US$250 million loan from the IADB for the purpose; of this, however, US$150 million were destined to unrelated social projects, six million were lost in IADB fines, US$90 million were never allocated, and only one million was used for the actual cleanup.

Upon stepping down when President Menem left office in 1999, financial transactions in her name totaling over US$200 million came under scrutiny, and Alsogaray was ultimately convicted of misappropriation of public funds in 2004. She was sentenced to three years in prison and served 21 months, thus becoming the only Menem administration official to serve time in prison. The statute of limitations expired on a number of other charges in 2013; but she was ultimately convicted to a second term in prison in February 2015 over the Haedo Palace charges.

==== Privatizations (1990–94) ====
Privatizations were viewed by the World Bank and the IMF in the 1990s as the preferred solution for developing countries such as Argentina to overcome the debt crisis. Accordingly, the Menem administration secured special powers from Congress, which enacted new legislation in shortly after his inaugural in 1989 authorizing the sale of some 300 state enterprises for US$24 billion. The proceeds were largely channeled toward repayment and monetization of the US$65 billion foreign debt (90% of which was found in a 1984 Economy Ministry audit to be fraudulent in nature). The US$31 billion in Brady Bonds issued for this purpose deepened the nation's debt crisis, however, because while Argentina serviced them at face value, the bonds typically traded at a steep discount.

Large public service rate increases, added to weak regulatory frameworks and constant renegotiation of concession contracts, brought outsized profits to the privatized companies. Between 1993 and 2000, the 200 largest companies in Argentina accumulated US$28.4 billion in profits, 56.8% of which were earned by privatized companies, and 26.3% by firms that had ties to those companies. Prices and wages were virtually frozen in Argentina from 1995 to 2001; but utility fees rose in line with the U.S. inflation rate, constituting an additional source of earnings for the newly privatized companies. The linking of public services fees charged in Argentina to the U.S. inflation rate enabled privatized companies to pocket US$9 billion by 2000. Additionally, privatized firms sent 70% of their earnings abroad while failing to pay the annual concession fees or to make all the investments stipulated by the contracts. The companies also imported large quantities of inputs and goods produced by associated firms, contracting heavy trade debts in dollars while violating a law that required them to prioritize Argentine products when making purchases.

The terms of the privatizations themselves often included lopsided benefits to the buyers. Some of the most notable cases included the ENTel state phone company, privatized in 1990 with US$180 million in land gifted to its buyers and at a further loss of US$250 million to the state; the Somisa state steel works, sold to Techint in 1992 for one seventh the book value of US$1 billion that Jorge Triaca, Alsogaray's predecessor at Somisa, had estimated; and Aerolíneas Argentinas, sold free of liabilities in 1990 (at a cost to Argentina of US$800 million) to Spain's Iberia, which indebted the airline by US$900 million over the next decade while selling off 29 of the 30 airplanes the firm owned when it was privatized.

==== IBM scandal (1995–98) ====
Allegations emerged in 1995 that IBM-Argentina had paid US$37m in kickbacks and bribes in 1993 to win a US$250m contract with the government-run Banco de la Nación. In 1998, arrest warrants were issued for four former IBM executives and Judge Angelo Bagnasco charged ten people with crimes, including a former president of Banco de la Nación and IBM-Argentina's former CEO and former COO. The New York Times noted in 1996 that six months after the initial revelations, the IBM scandal was "still front page news in Argentina, as new disclosures emerge almost weekly, tainting the computer giant's reputation for honesty here." In 2000, IBM was ordered by the U.S. Securities and Exchange Commission to pay a civil penalty of US$300,000. IBM was concurrently involved in no bid contracts awarded by Social Security Director Arnaldo Cisilino, which later resulted in the latter's indictment for fraud in 1998.

==== Arms-shipment deal and other Menem scandals ====
Menem was finally arrested in 2001 "for his alleged role in an illegal arms-shipments deal," involving the wartime export of weapons to Croatia and Ecuador in 1991 and 1996, only to be set free "after five months of house arrest...by his hand-picked Supreme Court." After his release, Menem and his second wife, Cecilia Bolocco, moved to Chile, from which Argentine authorities sought to have him extradited to face embezzlement charges. After the arrest warrants were canceled, Menem and his family returned to Argentina in December 2004. The case of the 1995 Río Tercero explosion, which killed seven people and was believed by prosecutors to be linked to the Croatia/Ecuador arms sale scandal, was likewise closed in 2006 with no indictments.

A 2008 settlement between Siemens and the U.S. government revealed that Menem administration officials had accepted about US$106 million in bribes from Siemens in exchange for being awarded a 1.2 billion-dollar National ID card and passport production contract in 1998, a violation of the Foreign Corrupt Practices Act.

In 2012, Menem was ordered to stand trial for obstruction of justice in an investigation of a 1994 bombing of a Jewish community center in which 85 people died; he was accused of covering up evidence connecting the attack to Hezbollah and Iran. In 2013, after an Appeals Court ruling found Menem guilty of smuggling weapons to Ecuador and Croatia, he was sentenced to seven years in prison. As a Senator, however, he was immune from incarceration, and was instead placed under house arrest. Oscar Camilión, who had been his Defense Minister, was sentenced to five and a half years.

=== Fernando de la Rúa ===
Fernando de la Rúa, President of Argentina from 1999 to 2001, was investigated in 2006, along with several members of his administration, on charges of financial irregularities and malfeasance during his presidency allegedly involving such international banks as Credit Suisse, First Boston Corporation, HSBC Bank Argentina, JP Morgan Securities, and Salomon Smith Barney.

The charges pertained to the 2001 Megaswap negotiated between Economy Minister Domingo Cavallo and said banks. Cavallo attempted to avoid a bond default by offering bondholders a swap, whereby longer-term, higher-interest bonds would be exchanged for bonds coming due in 2010. The Megaswap was accepted by most bondholders (particularly banks, which used the Megaswap to shed rapidly depreciating bonds), and delayed up to US$30 billion in payments that would have been due by 2005; but it also added US$38 billion in interest payments in the out years, and of the US$82 billion in bonds that eventually had to be restructured (triggering a wave of holdout lawsuits), 60% were issued during the 2001 megaswap. He and President de la Rúa were indicted in 2006 for malfeasance in public office related to the Megaswap, but were cleared of all charges in 2014.

De la Rúa was also indicted in 2008 on a charge of "aggravated active bribery." He was accused in October 2000 of having bribed senators that April for their vote in favor of a labor flexibilization law requested by the IMF. Several senators were also indicted on charges of accepting the bribes. He was also indicted on homicide charges in 2007, on the grounds that he had ordered attacks on demonstrators in 2001; de la Rúa escaped conviction in all these cases.

=== Néstor Kirchner ===
Néstor Kirchner, then governor of the Province of Santa Cruz, and his wife, Congresswoman Cristina Kirchner, "intensely and successfully lobbied President Carlos Menem in 1992 to sell the state oil company YPF". Upon its privatization in 1993, the federal government paid Santa Cruz Province US$654 million in long-outstanding royalties owed by YPF (minus a US$100 million tax debt). Governor Kirchner transferred the funds to Credit Suisse and other foreign banks in 2001. Kirchner became president in 2003, and pledged to repatriate the funds. Amid delays, a civil suit was filed against Kirchner in 2004; but it was dismissed in 2005 by the judge, who was Kirchner's nephew-in-law. A 2006 inquiry found that of the US$520 million fund, US$390 million remained in Credit Suisse. Santa Cruz Governor Daniel Peralta ultimately announced in 2008 that US$554 million had been repatriated.

One of the leaked cables noted that while Néstor Kirchner based his 2003 campaign largely on an anti-corruption platform the government had in fact placed less emphasis on efforts to combat corruption since 2004.

=== Cristina Kirchner ===
Cristina Fernandez de Kirchner currently faces some of the most serious charges of corruption since the return of democracy in 1983.

==== Suitcase scandal (2007) ====
Another case with foreign origins is that of Guido Alejandro Antonini Wilson, a self-identified member of the entourage of Hugo Chávez, who arrived in Argentina in August 2007 on a private flight paid for by Argentine and Venezuelan state officials. Wilson was carrying US$790,550 in cash, which he did not declare and which the police seized on arrival. A few days later Wilson, a Venezuelan-American and a close friend of Chávez's, was a guest at a signing ceremony involving Kirchner and Chávez at the Casa Rosada. He was later arrested on money laundering and contraband charges, and it was established that the cash was to have been delivered to the Kirchners as a clandestine contribution to Fernández's campaign chest.

The incident led to a scandal and what Bloomberg News called "an international imbroglio," with the U.S. accusing five men of being secret Chávez agents whose mission was to cover up the attempt to deliver the cash.

==== Skanska case (2007) ====
In 2007, Federal Judge Guillermo Montenegro was leading an investigation into bribes allegedly paid by Swedish firm Skanska to former government officials working on a gas pipeline project, and Carlos Stornelli was serving as prosecutor on the case, when both men received job offers that were viewed as motivated by a government attempt to stall the investigation. Montenegro received an offer from Buenos Aires Mayor-elect Mauricio Macri to join his cabinet as Security and Justice Minister, while Vice President offered Stornelli a job as Security Minister in Buenos Aires Province. If both men accepted the offers, the result would be a year-long halt in the investigation and prosecution of the Skansa case.

==== Ombudsman meeting with U.S. ambassador (2008) ====
An April 2008 cable later made leaked noted that the U.S. Ambassador to Argentina, Earl Anthony Wayne, had met with Argentina's National Ombudsman Dr. Eduardo Mondino, who had told him about "a case he is investigating involving possible corruption related to commissions being charged on government contractual transactions, the proceeds of which are being deposited in a U.S. bank."

==== Bendini case (2008) ====
Army Chief of Staff Roberto Bendini resigned in September 2008 in the wake of an Appeals Court's decision to proceed with charges against him for "peculado," or the improper diversion of funds. Bendini had been promoted over more senior generals by Kirchner despite Defense Minister Nilda Garré's apparent lack of confidence in him. Bendini was described as having operated a "parallel" bank account into which he diverted large sums of government money.

==== Francisco de Narváez (2009–13) ====
Congressman Francisco de Narváez, a senior member of the center-right Federal Peronist caucus, was discovered in 2009 to have placed numerous phone calls from his cell phone to Mario Segovia, the "king of ephedrine" (whose use as a recreational drug is illegal in Argentina). Subpoenaed by Judge Federico Faggionato Márquez, de Narváez initially announced he would resign from Congress, but later recanted, claiming a ranch hand in his employ used his phone to place the calls in question. Faggionato Márquez's successor, Judge Adrián González Charvay, dismissed the case in 2010.

He similarly came under scrutiny after declaring a 2008 taxable income of 670,000 pesos (around US$200,000) against 70 million pesos in exemptions, 30 million in inter vivos gifts to his children, and another 30 million in personal expenses. Accordingly, his tax liability was estimated to be at least 100 times what he actually paid, and in 2010 a tax lien was placed on his assets for 87 million pesos (US$22 million at the time). Another significant case – failure on the part of the La Rural-Ogden group (of which de Narváez is a partner) to repay a US$106 million loan from the Bank of the Province of Buenos Aires – expired via statute of limitations in 2013.

==== Santa Cruz property case (2011) ====
One of the leaked cables mentions an investigation of members of the Kirchner administration and its business allies in Santa Cruz province. The investigation focused on the purchase and resale, at massive profits, of large tracts of public land by nearly fifty top level politicians and businesspeople during Néstor Mendez's final years as the mayor of El Calafate, from 1995 to 2007. As of March 2011, the investigation into this case was being directed by prosecutor Natalia Mercado, the Kirchners' niece.

==== Shared Dreams case (2011) ====
In a 2011 article entitled "Corruption in Argentina", The Economist noted that Shared Dreams, the "social-work arm" of the respected Association of Mothers of the Plaza de Mayo, had become mired in corruption. Granted $45m of public funds to build housing for the poor, the group hired Meldorek, a company that was owned by Sergio Schoklender, who had been imprisoned for 14 years for murdering his parents, and that, according to other contractors, "was charging twice the market rate for homebuilding." After Schoklender left the firm, the courts began "investigating allegations of fraud, money-laundering and illegal enrichment." The Economist noted that President Fernández's closeness to the Association of Mothers risked "becoming an embarrassment".

==== Siemens case (2011) ====
The Argentine Securities and Exchange Commission (CNV) charged former Siemens executives with bribing two consecutive Argentine presidents – Carlos Menem and Fernando de la Rúa – with $100 million to secure a contract for a $1 billion national ID card." Kurtz concluded. "If the football federation launders money, if 13,000 police officers can be arrested for crimes, and if 60% of Argentines in a national survey believe they can pay law enforcement officials to avoid infractions, this society's problems might run deeper than mere technocratic adjustment."

==== Ralph Lauren (2013) ====
In April 2013, Ralph Lauren paid $1.6 million to the SEC to settle allegations that it bribed Argentine customs officials $580,000 in cash between 2004 and 2009 "to improperly obtain paperwork necessary for goods to clear customs; permit clearance of items without the necessary paperwork and/or the clearance of prohibited items; and on occasion, to avoid inspection entirely."

==== Buenos Aires municipal contracts (2013) ====
Civic watchdog group Poder Ciudadano ('Citizen Power') expressed concern over the Buenos Aires Public Contracts Law passed November 2013 by the Buenos Aires City Legislature and urged that it be vetoed by Mayor Mauricio Macri, who promoted and signed the bill. The concern was that the laws, dealing with municipal government contracts, would reduce transparency and eliminate control mechanisms, thus promoting corruption. Poder Ciudadano similarly denounced the municipal waste management bidding process and service (20% of the city's budget) for its lack of oversight in a 2013 report.

Mayor Macri, elected to the post in 2007, privatized numerous city services and made unprecedented use of subcontractors in the construction of municipal public works; expenditures on city contracts reached US$500 million in 2013 out of a municipal budget of US$8.8 billion. Some of the most controversial such contracts include those for the construction in 2013 of the Metrobus bus lanes on 9 de Julio Avenue, which cost 166 million pesos (US$30 million at the time) for 3 kilometres (1.9 mi) of lanes when routes completed in 2012 had cost 2.5-5.3 million pesos (US$0.5-1.1 million) per kilometer.

A similar controversy arose with Macri's purchase in 2011 of 178,000 school netbooks for US$274 million from PRIMA S.A., a subsidiary of the Clarín Group (the country's most influential media group). The contract yielded PRIMA a price premium of US$185 million, based on a similar purchase that year by the UTN. Documents related to the contract were subpoenaed in 2013 amid a money laundering investigation involving JP Morgan Chase's Argentine offices; PRIMA is one of 15 Clarín Group subsidiaries included in the JP Morgan case. Freedom of information laws in Argentina allow access to all public contracts records; but as of 2013, out of 500 such requests filed at Buenos Aires City Hall, fewer than 10% were answered.

==== Boudougate (2010–13) ====
The Argentine Revenue Administration (AFIP) called for the printing house Ciccone Calcográfica to declare bankruptcy in July 2010, but two months later, after Ciccone received 2.3 million pesos (US$600,000) from the Old Fund, a shell corporation whose representative, Alejandro Vandenbroele, thereupon became president of Ciccone, the AFIP rescinded its request and, on orders from then Minister of Economy Amado Boudou, allowed Ciccone time to refinance its debts. After Laura Muñoz, Vandenbroele's ex-wife, publicly accused him of being a front for Boudou, the latter denied the charge, but in April 2012 a judicial investigation revealed that Vandenbroele had paid the rent for a flat belonging to Boudou. Members of Congress tried unsuccessfully to impeach Boudou. In September 2013, a Federal Court permitted Boudou to file for a dismissal of charges. Despite the scandal, the Central Bank of Argentina commissioned Ciccone in March 2012 to print banknotes.

==== Lázaro Báez case (2013) ====
A massive and complicated scandal that emerged piecemeal over the course of much of 2013 focused on the Kirchners' relationship to public-works contractor Lázaro Báez, an longtime friend and business associate of theirs whose companies had been awarded many public works contracts during both Kirchners' presidencies. Journalist Jorge Lanata, on successive episodes of his highly rated Sunday-evening public-affairs program "Periodismo para todos" ("Journalism for All"), served up numerous allegations regarding Báez and Fernández.

Lanata claims that Báez would appear to have funneled taxpayer money from his government contracts back to the Kirchners in the form of rent payments for rooms at hotels owned by the couple. The official books of Báez-owned companies showed that they had spent millions of dollars "to reserve a third of the Kirchners' hotel rooms, whether the rooms were used or not". The state-owned airline Aerolíneas Argentinas "guaranteed another third of the rooms, providing a steady flow of profits to the presidential couple's private businesses".

Lanata also covered the fact that Báez, who was described as monopolizing all public works in Santa Cruz province, had bought several estates in Santa Cruz for US$28 million in 2007, allegedly having been informed that the province intended to build hydroelectric dams on the land. In addition, Lanata's program aired hidden-camera footage in which a Báez associate, Leonardo Fariña, admitted to involvement in a money-laundering network that handled proceeds from government corruption. Fariña had deposited 55 million euros of Báez's funds in Switzerland and said that Kirchner knew all about Báez's operations and was a partner in all of them.

Furthermore, Lanata revealed that a vault holding cash and sensitive documents was emptied and refitted as a wine cellar. One of the workers who took part in the conversion of the vault into a wine cellar took photos to protect himself, fearing he was involved in an illegal activity. Lanata sardonically congratulated Báez, who only a few years earlier had been a low-level bank employee, for amassing a fortune quicker than Henry Ford or Bill Gates.

Lanata also devoted some attention on his program to the Argentine judges and prosecutors who were reluctant to take the case, since it had been transferred to Río Gallegos courts, which were known to have Kirchner ties.

On an August 2013 episode of his program, Lanata charged that Fernández had stayed in the Seychelles, a tax haven, in January 2013 as part of a money-laundering operation involving Báez. A week later Lanata hosted on his program Nella De Luca, a Venezuelan journalist who claimed to have stayed in the same hotel as Fernández in the Seychelles at that time. Shortly after the program aired, the Casa Rosada issued a statement to the effect that Fernández's plane had made a "technical stop" in the Seychelles.

After Lanata's report about Báez and the Seychelles, Oscar Parrilli, Secretary General of the Presidency, called Lanata a "media hit man," in response to which Lanata said on CNN that he would take the matter to court. At one point, the government chose to blunt the impact of Lanata's show by scheduling evening matches between two very popular soccer teams, Boca Juniors and River Plate, directly opposite the Sunday-night program. Initially, more viewers watched Lanata's show than the soccer matches. His ratings later declined, however.

==== Zannini case (2013) ====
Carlos Zannini, the Executive Legal Advisor for the Kirchner administration, was accused in 2012 of several charges, including embezzlement of public funds, money laundering, and corruption. From 2003 to 2011 his personal wealth was reported to have increased by nearly thirty-eightfold (in pesos). A complaint was filed to this effect with Judge Norberto Oyarbide; the case was suspended for a time and only recently was the complaint further pursued.

It has been reported that members of Kirchner's administration and of the government have stalled the case and interfered in many ways. For instance, when Oyarbide ordered an investigative raid on Zannini's property to attain evidence, Carlos Liuzzi, a presidential secretary and subordinate of Zannini's, reportedly called him and ordered him to cancel the raid and offered him a bribe. Cabinet Chief Jorge Capitanich was asked to comment on the accusation, although no clear answers have been given. Press Secretary Oscar Parrilli stated that such accusations were false and that no call was ever made. Oyarbide, however, has publicly stated that he did receive a call from Liuzzi asking him to halt the raid.

=== 2020s ===
In 2025, leaked recordings alleged Karina Milei received kickbacks from a contract with the National Agency for Disability.

== Areas ==
=== Political corruption ===
Several parties announced in 2013, under the slogan "No more to corruption" (Nunca más a la corrupción), that they would propose that the Argentinian parliament create a bicameral commission to investigate government corruption. Margarita Stolbizer, a candidate in the 2013 elections, released a "Corruption Report" in August 2013, saying: "Corruption is dramatically black, because it is a corruption that has cost lives." Another candidate, Ricardo Alfonsin, submitted a set of proposals for increased transparency.

Quoting Pope Francis's description of corruption as "a weed of our times that infects politics, economy, and society," the editors of La Nación accused Argentinian officials in October 2013 of "embezzlement, bribery, extortion, illicit enrichment, negotiations incompatible with the exercise of public functions, concealment and laundering,...influence peddling and misappropriation of public funds," and blamed official corruption for 194 deaths at a dance club in 2004, 51 deaths in a train crash in Once in 2012, and 60 deaths in floods in 2013. The newspaper also attributed deficiencies in public access to housing and health care to various forms of corruption, ranging from outright embezzlement to the placement of medical aircraft at the service of officials instead of patients.

In a December 2013 editorial triggered by Argentina's poor performance in that year's corruption ratings by Transparency International, the editors of La Nación stated that the Argentine government "encourages lying, concealment and illegality." The newspaper's editors complained about the "very high level of impunity" for corrupt officials, and called on the government to promote a "culture of transparency" which would make possible a "culture of legality." La Nación has been at odds with the federal government over an injunction issued in October 2003 that allowed it to continue in subsequent years to claim an expired corporate tax credit on payroll taxes paid; were the injunction to be lifted, a US$50 million tax debt, including interest, would result.

There were 25 public cases in 2012 in which former and current government officials were accused of illicit enrichment. In September 2013, Ricardo Jaime, who had been Kirchner's Transportation Secretary, was given a six-month suspended sentence on charges of withholding evidence in a case of unjust enrichment. Ombudsman Eduardo Mondino told U.S. Ambassador Earl Anthony Wayne in 2011 about allegations that the Argentine government charged a 15% commission on all private international contracts, and wanted Wayne to help find out whether the earnings were being deposited in a U.S. bank. A German CEO also told Planning Minister Julio De Vido that one of the latter's aides had asked him for a bribe.

==== Patronage jobs ====
As an example of Argentine political corruption, Brink Lindsey of The Wall Street Journal has noted that Tucumán Province's public sector has been used almost exclusively to enrich politicians and fund patronage jobs. Elected officials are alleged to embezzle enough funds to create fortunes for themselves, with the annual salary of provincial legislators amounting to roughly $300,000. Such corruption, stated Lindsey, is common elsewhere in Argentina. In Formosa Province, Argentina's poorest, roughly half of the workforce is on the government's payroll but many only show up to work once a month.

Such corruption, according to Lindsey, contributed to Argentina's financial crisis. He noted that while many blame the free market for Argentina's woes, it is rather the control economics in place that have caused such problems.

==== Intelligence Secretariat and Battalion 601 ====
The Secretariat of Intelligence (SI) was established by President Juan Perón in 1946 as the State Information Coordination Secretariat (CIDE); it was renamed SIDE in 1958, and SI in 2001. Its first director was Rodolfo Freude, one of the principal figures in the ODESSA Nazi post-war ratline. Since its inception, the SI was responsible for spying on politicians, journalists, intellectuals and trade unionists; gathering information that even today remains "classified". As both the Cold War and leftist political violence intensified in the early 1970s, however, the SIDE would acquire a prominent role in the persecution, murder, and disappearance of thousands of people during Argentina's Dirty War in the mid-1970s.

The CIA contributed to this policy with intelligence training and technical assistance, including arson techniques for "clean" fires whose origin was made difficult to detect. This collaboration, as well as similar arrangements with other South American dictatorships, was known as Operation Condor, and was formally implemented in 1975. SIDE worked closely with the Triple A right-wing death squad initially, and with the Argentine Army Intelligence unit, Battalion 601, after the March 1976 coup. SIDE operated the Automotores Orletti detention facility in Buenos Aires in which around 300 people were killed, with the victims' property distributed among the torturers. Two of its managers, SIDE officer Aníbal Gordon and Battalion 601 officer Raúl Guglielminetti, had also belonged to the Triple A and later perpetrated numerous ransom kidnappings. The "Gordon Group", as it was known, worked with the cooperation of mafiosi such as the Puccio family, SIDE colleagues including Alejandro Encino (whose father-in-law, General Otto Paladino, headed SIDE during the dictatorship), General Eduardo Cabanillas (who headed the 2nd Army Corps in the 1990s), and François Chiappe (a convicted bank thief and French Connection heroin trafficker).

President Raúl Alfonsín, elected to succeed the dictatorship in 1983, sought to demilitarize SIDE by appointing its first civilian director and ending its partnership with Battalion 601. Some SIDE agents implicated in human rights abuses, such as Luis Sarmiento, fled the country. Others, however, made attempts to infiltrate sensitive government posts – notably Raúl Guglielminetti, who in 1985 was discovered to have infiltrated the president's security detail.

The most serious case of intelligence agency wrongdoing involved banker Osvaldo Sivak. Sivak had been kidnapped for ransom by Battalion 601 agents in 1979, and again in 1985; his buried corpse was found two years later. A subsequent investigation by Federal Police Chief Juan Ángel Pirker revealed that Sivak had been kidnapped and murdered by former Federal Police captains who had worked for both Battalion 601 and SIDE during the dictatorship. Because Sivak was a top fundraiser and close personal friend of President Alfonsín, the murder was interpreted as a threat against Alfonsín and his efforts to reform the two agencies. The "Captains' Band," as it became known, was responsible for numerous other high-profile ransom kidnappings from 1978 to 1991, including those of Karina Werthein and Mauricio Macri. Like their military and police counterparts, intelligence officers implicated in the Dirty War benefited from Full Stop and Due Obedience laws signed by Alfonsín in 1987, and pardons signed by Menem in 1990. Many, however, were convicted in the decade after the repeal of amnesty in 2003 to prison terms ranging from 6 to 25 years for criminal conspiracy.

=== Police corruption ===
Corruption is a pervasive and widespread practice among police agents in Argentina. It’s hard to know with precision the extent of corruption within Argentine law enforcement. Corruption is difficult to measure because most of it is never discovered and/or is not reported. However, there are some numbers that can indicate the extent of the problem in Argentina. In 2008, there were 120 investigations against police officers in relation to allegations of corruption and criminal involvement.

In the Buenos Aires Provincial Police force alone, there were 13,619 police officers investigated for acts of corruption, violence, and/or irregularities between 2008 and 2009 according to the General Auditing Office of Internal Affairs. Global Integrity ranks Argentine law enforcement as weak on anti-corruption performance with a score of 63 over 100. Likewise, Transparency International (TI)’s Bribe Payers Index 2008 gives the Argentine police a score of 3.9 on a 5-point scale, 1 being 'not at all corrupt' and 5 'extremely corrupt.'

The most common form of corruption practiced in Argentina by police agents is the request of a bribe or the acceptance of a bribe offered by citizens who committed a traffic violation or any ordinary infringement of the law in order to avoid legal penalties. According to Barómetro de las Américas done by the Latin American Public Opinion Project, in Argentina, 15% of the population has been asked for a bribe by a police agent. This finding is backed by the Latinobarómetro 2008, which found that 59% of Argentines believe that it is possible to bribe a policeman in order to avoid a fine or arrest.

There is also strong evidence that police agents act in connivance with criminals. In exchange for a percentage of the proceeds from criminal activities, police officers facilitate “freed zones” –where police officers do not go in- for thieves to be able to carry out robberies or kidnappings, or for drug dealers to be able to sell drugs. In other words, it is a common practice for criminals in Argentina to operate under protection of the police. In addition, law enforcement officers are known to be involved in organized criminal activities. According to Freedom House 2010, Buenos Aires police has been involved in several incidents of drug trafficking and extortion. Police officers are also involved in arms trafficking. Police arms depots or warehouses function as a source of weapons for the black market.

=== Lack of transparency ===
Another linchpin of official corruption in Argentina is the lack of public access to government information. There is a 2003 decree that provides for such access, but it applies only to executive entities and companies that receive state funds. Transparency International has called for a federal law that would increase transparency and accountability.

=== Banking and money laundering ===
Numerous large bank fraud and asset stripping cases have taken place in Argentina since banking deregulation was enacted by the last dictatorship in 1977, most of which led to the insolvency of the banks involved; some were resolved by the Central Bank, but at considerable cost to public coffers. The most notable early case was probably that of the BIR, whose US$3 billion Ponzi scheme collapse in March 1980 triggered a nationwide financial crisis. Its chairman, José Trozzo, shared ownership of the bank with among others Admiral Emilio Massera (the second most powerful figure in the military junta during its first three years); Trozzo evaded justice by fleeing to Mexico, leaving the bank's last director, Raúl Piñero Pacheco, to pay US$20 million in Central Bank penalties.

Other significant such cases include Banco Internacional (1981), which collapsed under US$1.2 billion in securities fraud orchestrated by its chairman, Rómulo Seitún, and led to the bankruptcy of the largest agroindustrial firm in Argentina at the time, Sasetrú; Banco Alas, the nation's 13th largest when it was shuttered in 1986 for defrauding the Central Bank; Banco Mayo (1998), whose US$200 million collapse led to a prison term for former DAIA president Rubén Beraja; Banco República (1999), whose chairman Raúl Moneta obtained a US$89 million rediscount from the Central Bank four days before his bank collapsed and had a US$26 million tax debt condoned despite fleeing the country; and Banco Velox (2002), whose owners, the Peirano Basso brothers, transferred US$800 million in deposits to a Cayman Islands offshore bank, leading to the insolvency of Velox, Banco Alemán (Paraguay), and Banco Montevideo (Uruguay). With the exception of Rubén Beraja (who is Jewish), the chairmen involved in each of these bank collapses were members of the right-wing Roman Catholic group, Opus Dei.

Another major category of corruption has been money laundering. In a March 2009 cable, the U.S. Embassy in Buenos Aires reported on the controversy over Argentina's new tax amnesty law and allegations by opposition politicians that it facilitates money laundering. The Financial Action Task Force (FATF) had told the Argentine press that "It's not enough to have a good law, you have to apply it." In 2011, however, Transparency International commended Argentina for a law enacted that year that recognizes money laundering as an offense in and of itself and prescribes substantial punishments, and in October 2014 the Financial Action Task Force removed Argentina from its "gray list" and noted the government's improving control over money laundering.

The seriousness of the issue was again highlighted, however, by a February 2014 fire at a southside Buenos Aires corporate records warehouse owned by U.S. based Iron Mountain Incorporated. The fire, which killed nine firemen and a civil defense officer, followed charges by the AFIP revenue bureau that Iron Mountain South America Ltd. and Iron Mountain Chile S.A. are front companies operating from tax havens. Money laundering investigations were subsequently initiated against 24 firms (out of 642) with documentation stored at the warehouse. Similar fires had recently taken place in four Iron Mountain facilities in North America and Europe.

=== Tax evasion ===
Tax evasion has long saddled Argentina's public finances, shifting the burden to the middle and working classes by way of high value-added taxes (which are easier to collect). Improvements in enforcement since the 1990s have abated the problem from its peak in the 1980s, when fully half of all tax liabilities (and most income taxes) were evaded. Nevertheless, Hernán Arbizu, a former JP Morgan Chase executive, testified in 2013 and 2014 on how Argentine firms and wealthy Argentine clients still evade billions of dollars in taxes using local banks and exchange houses. Among those implicated were the Clarín Media Group; energy firm Petrobras Argentina; electricity distributor Edesur; the late María Amalia Lacroze de Fortabat and her executor, Congressman Alfonso Prat-Gay; former YPF head Sebastián Eskenazi; and the late television host Bernardo Neustadt.

During his testimony, he described how he helped clients move funds to offshore accounts (mainly in Switzerland), using private banking offices and legal loopholes. He stated that around US$85 billion had been transferred from Argentina to around 4,000 such accounts as part of a massive scheme that began in 2000, resulting in tax evasion losses of 60 billion pesos (US$7 billion); with the sole exception of Banco Credicoop, all 60 major banks in Argentina, including several local offices of foreign banks, had been involved.

Another similar case was that of HSBC Bank Argentina, which the 2014 SwissLeaks scandal revealed to have facilitated tax evasion on US$3.8 billion by over 4,000 local account holders. Accordingly, the AFIP revenue bureau had the courts issue an international arrest warrant on Miguel Abadi, whose GEMS fund accounted for at least US$1.4 billion of this total.

=== Media groups ===
The larger media conglomerates in Argentina, particularly the Clarín Group and La Nación, oppose anti-trust laws passed during Cristina Kirchner's administration to replace media ownership laws enacted in 1980 under the last dictatorship. Media consolidation has become the greater threat to freedom of the press in Argentina and elsewhere in Latin America, according to UN Special Rapporteur on Freedom of Expression Frank LaRue, and he, the IFJ, and a majority of journalist respondents in a 2011 Argentine Journalism Forum (FOPEA) survey consider the new law a partial or even substantial progress compared to the previous one.

The shared ownership by the Clarín Group, La Nación, and the Argentine Government in Papel Prensa (the largest producer of newsprint in Argentina), has also been marked by controversy. The administration alleged that the sale of Papel Prensa by the family of the late David Graiver in 1976 was done so by illicit means and in collusion with the dictatorship. The government presented a report in 2010 claiming that during the Dirty War, while being coerced, the Graivers were forced to sell the newsprint maker at a bargain price. Another source of contention between the government and its private partners in Papel Prensa was a preferential pricing scale that allowed La Nación and the Clarín Group's numerous dailies to buy newsprint at a 25% discount while other dailies were charged prices based on expensive Chilean imports; the practice was made illegal in 2010.

The Clarín Group and La Nación are also at odds with federal regulators over a 2008 case of securities fraud by the Clarín Group against pension funds holding Clarín stock, and the continued use since 2003 of an expired corporate tax credit on payroll taxes (worth over US$50 million) in the case of La Nación.

=== Pharmaceuticals and narcotics ===
In late 2008, the then Minister of Health of Argentina, Graciela Ocaña, informed U.S. Ambassador Anthony Wayne that pharmaceutical corruption was one of many major problems afflicting the country's health-care system. Citing allegations of price manipulation and fraudulent products, Ocaña called for greater transparency on the part of the agency responsible for distributing drugs. Also, the Argentinian government was purchasing "fraudulent medicines" from pharmaceutical manufacturers that had contributed to Fernández's 2007 election campaign. Ocaña said it was a challenge to effectively run her ministry when the money allocated for public health was in fact going to "other places."

A 2013 report by the U.S. State Department indicates that the Argentine Government does not actively produce or encourage the production of narcotics. Nevertheless, "several security force members, including high-ranking officers," were accused in 2012 of cocaine and marijuana trafficking on a grand scale or protecting trafficking schemes.

According to one 2013 source, the epicenter of the country's drug trade is the city of Rosario. There were minimal import restrictions on these "precursor chemicals," including ephedrine and pseudoephedrine, which are used to produce drugs like cocaine and methamphetamine, and the Kirchner and Fernández administrations were loath to impose restrictions on pharmaceuticals, since pharmaceutical companies were among the Kirchners' largest campaign donors.

=== Political finance ===
Another area in which there is extensive corruption in Argentina is political financing. There is an insufficient degree of transparency and accountability, and although recently passed legislation forbids donations by companies to political campaigns, there are ways for businesses to skirt the law and cover non-campaign expenses by politicians and parties. Incumbents also enjoy a decided advantage.

Campaign finance corruption may originate abroad, as well. NML Capital Limited, the Cayman Islands-based vulture fund demanding US$832 million for Argentine bonds purchased for US$49 million in the secondary market in 2008, was found in 2013 to be the principal backer of the NGO run by Congresswoman Laura Alonso of the right-wing PRO; this NGO – and Congresswoman Alonso – had been vocally lobbying for NML up to that point.

=== Judicial integrity ===
Argentine courts "are slow, inefficient, and vulnerable to corruption and executive branch influence," according to a 2013 report by The Heritage Foundation. The general perception is that many members of Argentina's judiciary are political appointees who enjoy a close relationship with the executive branch. Another major problem is that the judicial system is plagued by inefficiency, delays, and insufficient administrative support. It is a common practice for government officials to offer political jobs to judges in charge of important cases, thereby derailing the cases.

The Centre for the Study and Prevention of Economic Crimes has noted that corruption cases in Argentina take an average of 14 years to be resolved. Out of 750 cases tried during a certain period, only 15 resulted in convictions. This is said to be the result of Fernández's "neuter[ing]" of "government oversight," which she has accomplished by "giving auditing posts to cronies compromised by conflicts of interest."

La Nación accused the government in October 2013 of seeking "to impose an absurd judicial reform" designed largely "to guarantee the impunity of those in power." The newspaper also accused the government of amending the "reform" of the civil and commercial codes in order to enhance the impunity of public officials, "thus distorting the original initiative."

In November 2013, the Court of Criminal Appeals canceled the prosecution of 25 individuals who had been government ministers and high officials under Menem and who had been accused of accepting inappropriate bonuses. The prosecution was canceled on the grounds that the defendants' right of due process had been violated. Among the defendants were former Labor Minister José Armando Caro Figueroa, former Justice Minister Elias Jassan, former Interior Secretary Adelina D'Alessio de Viola, and former Secretary of Trade and Investment Carlos Sánchez. The case was remanded to a lower court.

== Public perceptions ==
In July 2013, 72% of Argentines thought that corruption in their country had increased during the previous year, with politicians and parties identified as the most corrupt institutions.

=== Buenos Aires street protests (November 2012) ===
Thousands of Argentines held a street protest against their government in Buenos Aires in November 2012, waving signs that read: "Stop the wave of Argentines killed by crime, enough with corruption and say no to constitutional reform." The Guardian noted that Argentines were plagued by "increasingly bold home robberies, in which armed bands tie up families until victims hand over the cash that many Argentines have kept at home since the government froze savings accounts and devalued the currency in 2002. The vast majority of the crimes are never solved, while the death toll is rising."

=== Nationwide protests (April 2013) ===
Nationwide demonstrations on April 18, 2013, focused largely on corruption and "the sense of official impunity." "A giant wave of peaceful protesters took to the streets of Argentina," reported The Guardian, "banging spoons against kitchen pots, in a rally that attracted even larger crowds than a similar mass demonstration in November against corruption, inflation and insecurity under Cristina Fernández de Kirchner." Organized via Facebook and Twitter, the rally "was fuelled by anger against judicial overhaul being pushed through Congress that could give the government virtual control of the courts" and came in the wake of "allegations that businessmen laundered tens of millions of euros obtained from public work contracts through offshore accounts." Protesters carried signs reading "Argentina, wake up!" and "Corrupt Cristina."

=== Concerns by foreign powers ===
In 2011, leaked cables revealed that diplomats from the United States, Germany, Spain, and Finland had grown concerned about the increasing levels of corruption. In May 2008, for example, the Secretary General of the Spanish cabinet, Bernardino León was quoted in a leaked cable as saying that Spanish companies doing business in Argentina were growing concerned at the populist sentiments and polarization of the Argentine government, as well as the corruption level among the Kirchner network. In February 2008, German ambassador Wolf Rolf Schumacher also expressed concern with the Cristina Kirchner administration's attitude towards corruption.

A great number of the leaked cables indicate that the U.S. Embassy in Argentina has been actively involved in anti-corruption efforts on the part of Argentinian officials and others in Argentina. The Spanish newspaper El País reported in 2011 that "official corruption in Argentina worries the U.S., whose embassy in Buenos Aires sent to the State Department over a hundred confidential dispatches over several years warning about the fragility of the judicial system in the South American country and about the impunity of those who commit crimes."

== Anti-corruption institutions ==
The principal government entities whose role is to fight official corruption are the Auditor General 's Office and the Anti-Corruption Office. There are similar entities in each province and in the Buenos Aires municipal government.

Transparency International has complained that such agencies as the Anti-Corruption Office, the Auditor General's Office, and the General Comptrollers Office "need a more robust mandate to hold public officials to account" and should "be independent and more proactive in corruption investigations."

Leaked cables revealed that in 2007, Dr. Abel Fleitas Ortiz de Rozas, then head of Argentina's Office of Anticorruption, told the US ambassador of the challenges Argentina faces in combatting corruption, among them a perceived tolerance of corruption, no transparency, and an ineffective legal system.

=== Manuel Garrido ===
A May 2009 report noted that Argentina's lead District Attorney of the National Prosecutor's Office for Administrative Investigations, Manuel Garrido, initiated more than a hundred investigations, but during a more than five-year period obtained no convictions. After his March 2011 resignation, Garrido was replaced by Julio Vitobello, a close friend to the Kirchners known for arranging soccer matches at their residence. Among the cases in which Garrido had been involved were Guillermo Moreno alleged manipulation of the Argentine statistical agency, INDEC; the Skanska scandal wherein the company was billing false invoice; a case of a literal bag of cash being discovered in the office of Felisa Miceli; the allegations of Néstor Kirchner's and Daniel Marx's illicit enrichment; a contract for electrical cable installations being one by a company with close ties to the Kirchners; and contracts for rail repair being won by Ricardo Jaime, the Transport Secretary.

Garrido had also filed criminal complaints against Claudio Uberti, who had been implicated in the 'Valijagate' scandal wherein Hugo Chávez was alleged to have funneled Venezuelan money for Cristina Kirchner's campaign, and Jorge Simeonoff for alleged collusion in contract negotiations for highway construction jobs.

== See also ==
- Corruption in Brazil
- Crime in Argentina
- Geography of Argentina
- Population of Argentina
- International Anti-Corruption Academy
- Group of States Against Corruption
- International Anti-Corruption Day
- ISO 37001 Anti-bribery management systems
- United Nations Convention against Corruption
- OECD Anti-Bribery Convention
- Transparency International
