= Kemenyffy =

Kemenyffy is a surname. Notable people with the surname include:

- Steven Kemenyffy (born 1943), American artist
- Susan Hale Kemenyffy (born 1941), American artist
