= Barragan =

Barragan or Barragán may refer to:

- Barragán (surname), with a list of people of this name (includes 'Barragan')
- Barragan Luisenbarn, the second espada in the manga Bleach
- Barragán (Blonde Redhead album), 2014
  - "Barragán", the title track from the album
- Barragan (cloth), a type of woven cloth
- Luis Barragán House and Studio, Mexico City, residence of architect Luis Barragán
