= Billpocket =

Financial company based in Mexico

- Company type: Private
- Industry: Fintech
- Founded: 2012
- Founder: Alejandro Guízar
- Headquarters: Mexico

Billpocket is a financial company based in Mexico founded by Alejandro Guízar in 2012. .

== Overview ==
The company provides a solution that converts a mobile device into a point of sale that allows the vendors to accept payments through credit cards or debit cards. The company is certified by banking institutions and is allied with financial institutions such as American Express, Visa, and mastercard.

In 2016, the company launched a bluetooth implemented card reader that operates on any smartphone or tablet with Android or iOS operating systems.

== Achievements ==
Billpocket was among the 8 startups selected by Coca-Cola for the Latin America Bridge Program, a joint venture by Coca-Cola and their bottling partner Arca Continental.

Alejandro Guízar was finalist of EY Entrepreneur of The Year México 2017.
