= Fustian =

Variety of heavy cloth

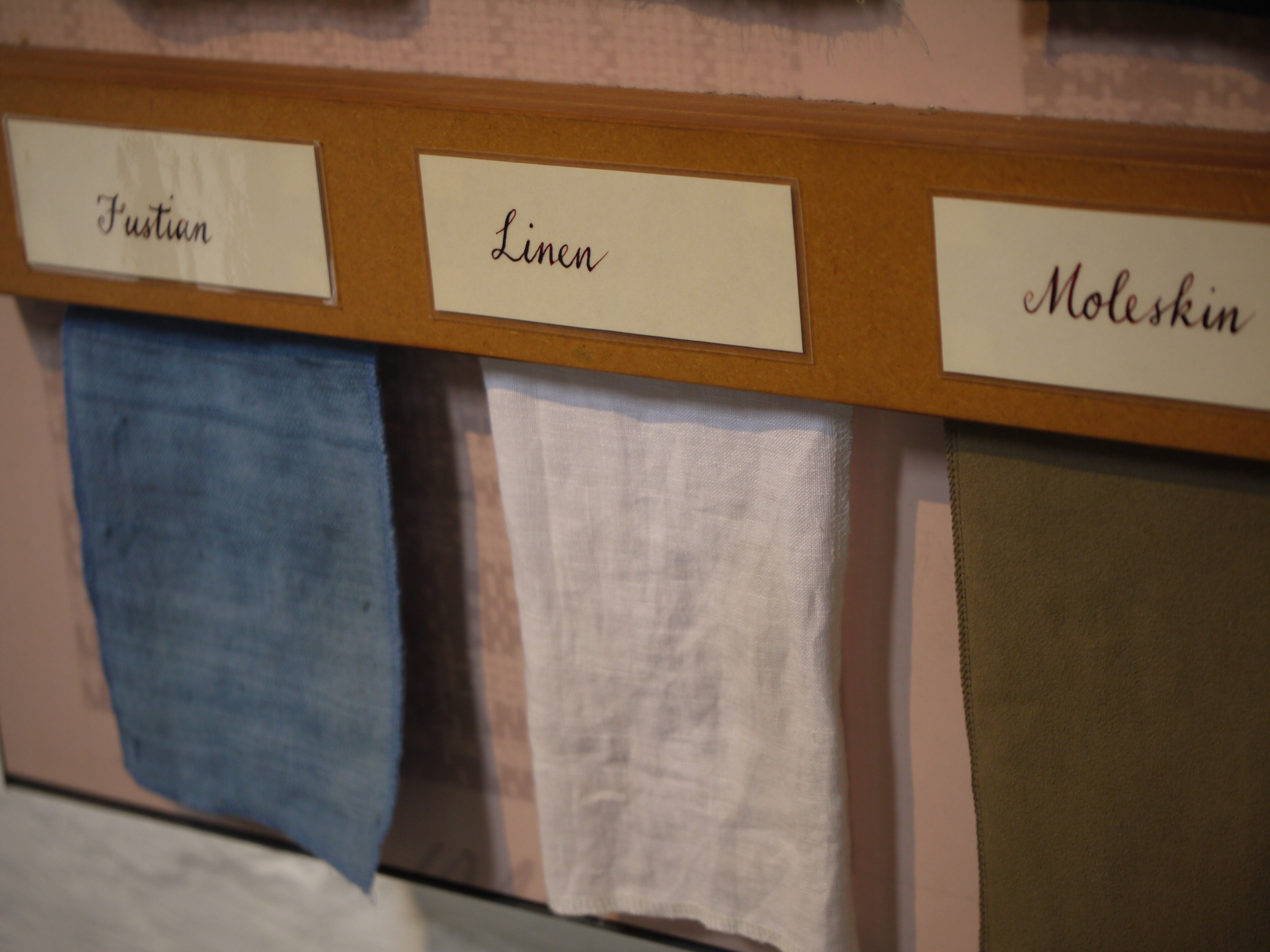
Textile samples: fustian, linen and moleskin

Fustian is a variety of heavy cloth woven from cotton, chiefly prepared for menswear.

== History and use ==
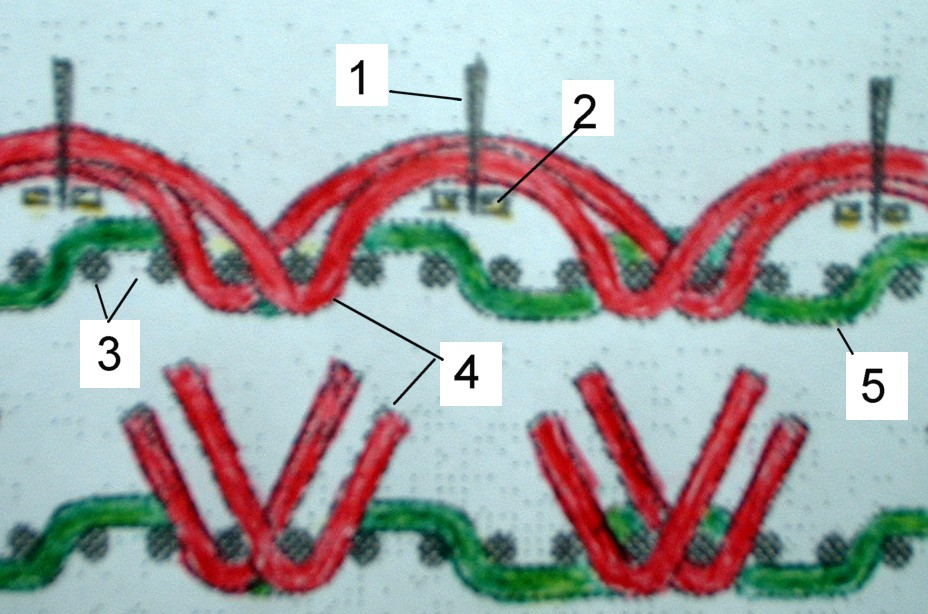
Corduroy: This modern diagram shows the warp (3) and the long (red-4) and short (green-5) weft threads; traditionally the knife (1) and the guide (2) are attached and the cutting motion is upwards.

Known in Late Latin as fustaneum or fustanum and in Medieval Latin as pannus fustāneus ('fustian cloth') or tela fustānea ('fustian mesh'), the cloth is possibly named after the Egyptian city of Fustat near Cairo that manufactured such a material.

It embraces plain twilled cloth known as jean, and cut fabrics similar to velvet, known as velveteen, moleskin, corduroy etc. The original medieval fustian was a stout but respectable cloth with a cotton weft and a linen warp. The term seems to have quickly become less precise, and was applied to a coarse cloth made of wool and linen, and in the reign of Edward III of England, the name was given to a woollen fabric. By the early 20th century, fustians were usually of cotton dyed various colours.

In a petition to Parliament during the reign of Mary I, "fustian of Naples" is mentioned. In the 13th and 14th centuries priests' robes and women's dresses were made of fustian. In the early 20th century, dresses were still made from some kinds, but the chief use was for labourers' clothes. From the mid-1600s to the mid-1700s, fustian was often used for bed hangings.

Fustian, by the 1860s, referred to any cut weft cotton fabric, and its manufacture was common in towns of the fringe of the Lancashire cotton region, such as Congleton in Cheshire, Mow Cop in Staffordshire and Heptonstall in Calderdale. Wilmslow, in Cheshire, was a major centre for the cutting of Fustian. From 1800 to 1850 it was commonly called Baragan Fustian, and much used in Australia.

== Manufacture ==
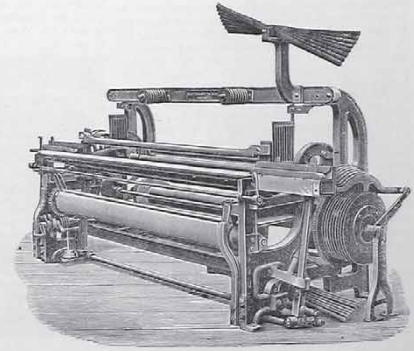
A loom used to manufacture fustian

Fustian cutting was a laborious process using a fustian cutting knife. This tool was around 50 centimetres (20 in) long, and looked like a long spike; about 10 centimetres (3.9 in) from the tip, the top edge was sharpened into a blade. It was inserted along the fabric alongside two warp threads, and under the raised weft, and as it was guided forward the blade severed the weft. In corduroy, there were seven ridges to the inch, so along a 31-inch (790 mm) bolt, there would be about 320 cuts to be done.

In the 1860s, the cloth would be stretched over a 22-yard-long (20 m) table, and the cutters would walk the length of the table as many times as was necessary. In recent times the cloth was tensioned over a 6-foot (1.8 m) table where all the cuts were made, and then the cloth would be released and the next two yards tensioned onto the table. Over a 60-hour week the cutter would be expected to produce 500 yards (460 m) of 7–8 ridge corduroy. Velveteen was cut the same way but had 32 ridges per inch, so production would be proportionately less.

Cutting was one part of the process. The yarn was sized and the cloth was woven—there would be a high number of weft threads to warp. The ridges were manually cut, and the cloth sent to be finished. It was scoured to remove the size, and brushed to raise the nap. This was then singed over a gas flame, then bleached and or dyed. It was brushed again. It was now stentered to pull it out to the standard width. The cloth was woven at about 31 inches (790 mm) and during processing shrank to 27 inches (690 mm); stentering stabilised the width to 28 inches (710 mm). The back of the cloth would now be filled to give it stiffness: this could be with a glue-based mixture made from boiled bones, although each manufacturer had its own techniques. The cloth was now ready to be taken to the warehouse to be sold.

== Political significance ==
Fustian was worn by workers during the 19th century. Accordingly, radical elements of the British working class chose to wear fustian jackets as a symbol of their class allegiance. This was especially marked during the Chartist era. The historian Paul Pickering has called the wearing of fustian "a statement of class without words."

Fustian also refers to pompous, inflated or pretentious writing or speech, starting from the time of Shakespeare. This literary use arose because the cloth type was often used as padding, hence, the purposeless words are fustian. Bombast, plant fibre used directly as padding (and not as fabric), has a similar literary meaning.

== See also ==
- Barragan (cloth), Spanish term describing a variety of medieval textiles
- Evolution of blue jeans
- Fustanella, a skirt-like men's garment

== General and cited references ==
- Harper, Douglas. "fustian". Online Etymology Dictionary.
- Pickering, Paul, A., "Class Without Words: Symbolic Communication in the Chartist Movement", Past and Present, cxii, August 1986, 144–162.
