= Luis Barragán (painter) =

Argentine painter

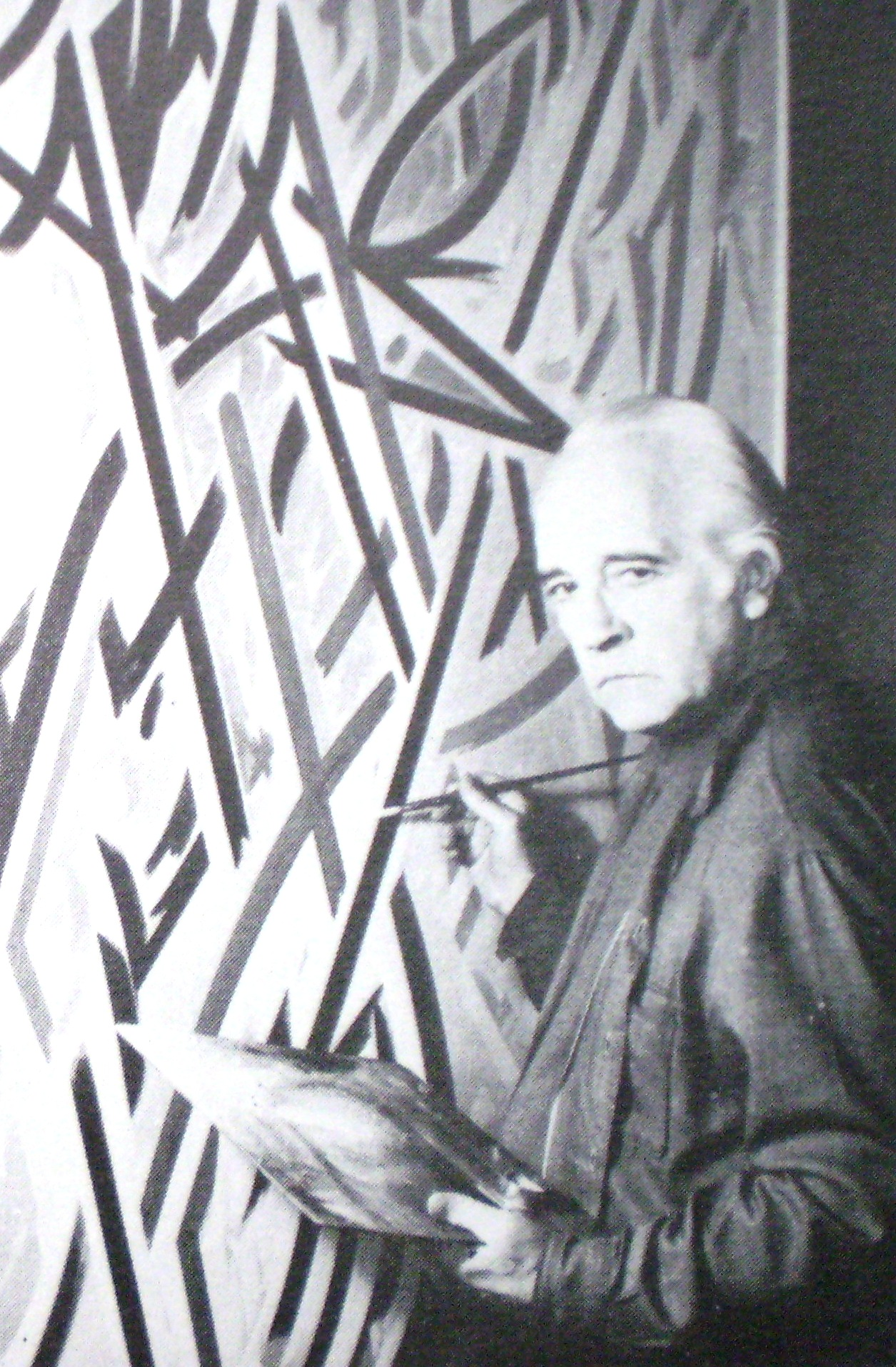
- Born: 17 December 1914; Buenos Aires, Argentina
- Died: July 25, 2009 (aged 94); Buenos Aires, Argentina
- Writing career
- Period: 1939–2002
- Genres: Abstract, Figurative, Surrealist

Luis Barragán (17 December 1914 – 25 July 2009) was an Argentine painter of the Abstract, Figurative, and Surrealist schools.

== Life and work ==
Luis Barragán was born in Buenos Aires in 1914, and studied at the National Art School and the Ernesto de la Cárcova School of Fine Arts.

In 1933 Barragán met Mauricio Lasansky (painter and printmaker) and the two young artists spent time painting murals across Argentina. Some of Barragán's and Lasansky's earliest professional work was done during 1933-1937 together. Lasansky later married Barragán's sister Emilia in 1937.

He secured his first gallery exhibition in 1939 as a member of the Orion Group. The Orion Group, which he founded with Vicente Forte, Orlando Pierri, Leopoldo Presas, Ideal Sánchez, and art critic Ernesto Rodríguez, became the leading local exponent of Surrealism in art. Art gallery catalogs featuring images of Barragán's canvases would feature his signature phrase: "In art, each work, as it is being created, will make its own rules."

After the two exposures of Orion, Barragán worked on a series of small canvases with figures and heads, and these were displayed in his first solo exhibition, at the Galería Sintonía, in 1948. The geometric aesthetic in his works yielded more toward the abstract during the 1950s, and broke with the Geometric, Concrete and Lyrical Abstraction trends prevailing among Argentine artists at the time.

Barragán was among the founders of the Twenty Painters and Sculptors group, with whom he worked between 1952 and 1963; the group also included Julián Althabe, Vicente Forte, Carlos Torrallardona, Bruno Venier, Líbero Badii, Aurelio Macchi and Juan Carlos Labourdette. He was given a second solo exhibition in 1957 at the Wildenstein Gallery, and he participated in the São Paulo Biennale in 1954 and 1973. The National Academy of Fine Arts awarded Barragán the Augusto Palanza Prize in 1971, and in 1977, he was incorporated as a distinguished academic.

Among his staunchest supporters since the Fifties, art critic and poet Rafael Squirru published a book on the painter in 1960 and many articles on his work over the years. In Squirru's work "Claves del arte actual", the artist is thus described: "Reaching at times the raptures of mysticism, Luis Barragán continues to be, in Shakespeare's words, "caviar to the general". In order to be appreciated, his aesthetic polyphony requires a degree of concentration not everyone is willing to make. As if emanating from an atomic battery, Barragán irradiates the type of energy which the years will cause to yield fruit, to the glory of the ascetic path he continues to follow..."

3 He continued to exhibit work in local galleries in subsequent years, notably in a series hosted by the now defunct Banco Alas. Another artist regularly featured in this series, his younger brother Julio Barragán, also became well known in Argentina. The elder Barragán's art show appearances became less frequent in later years, though in September 2002, he was featured in a Van Eyck Gallery exhibition. Local critic Raúl Santana wrote on the occasion that his work "appears more vital, prouder and more uncompromising than ever. The intensity of the color in both the backdrop and the lines provide a constant counterpoint, and reflects the artist's well-known love of music."

Barragán died on 25 July 2009, at age 94.
