= Barragán family =

Families that use the surname Barragán

The Barragán family are several important families that use the surname Barragán. Recently, the most notorious Barragán family comes from Mexico.

== House of Barragán ==
The surname Barragán was common during the Middle Ages, but according to Arturo and Alberto García Carraffa, the origin of the Barragán family was in Pontevedra. In 1492, Ramón Barragán married a woman from the Kingdom of Navarre and moves to Puente de la Reina, in Pamplona. He was named knight and his house became prestigious. One branch of his family moved to Seville, and from there another branch formed in Ahillones, and then to Guadalajara. The house became known for the military service. They fought the Turks and helped on the invasion of Francia.

Another house of the same name was formed in 1641, when Rodrigo Barragán Banousen was named kinght of the Order of Santiago. It is believed Martín Peláez de Barragán is his descendant.

== Fernández Barragán ==
=== History ===
The so-called Fernández Barragán family originated in the 18th century, when Gabriel Fernández de Lima del Castillo y Domínguez settled in Coscatlán, New Spain, and married María Teresa de Jáuregui Barragán in 1735, thus officially changing his last name. He indulged in several activities, including as a muleteer, loan shark and a successful merchant, selling, amongst other things, alcoholic drinks. Gabriel had several children, and only Felipe Santiago and Juana Fernández de Lima were considered legitimate. Gabriel died moneyless and in disgrace, but Felipe was trained in dealing with family business and inherited about 1,500 pesos nonetheless.

Felipe joined José de Escandón militia and married twice with families related with the Andrada Moctezuma family, the most powerful family from the region. In 1755 he married Ana María de los Dolores Trejo y Sáenz, and in 1782 he married María Faustina Ortiz de Zárate. Together with his half-brother, José Amaranto, he opened the Casa Comercial del Valle del Maíz, where he sold several imported goods and saw his money grow. In the 1770s, Felipe left their entrepreneurship and opened several selling points scattered in New Spain, thus creating his own merchant route. He was also part of bigger routes, from Querétaro and Mexico City. From 1777 on, Felipe joined the royal order, thus gaining money over the taxes in the region of Valle del Maíz, and later other regions as well. Thus, he came to be known as an important investor with a lot of money in his hands. He mostly invested in Ríoverde and Santiago de los Valles, where he became an important land owner and dedicated his lands for sugarcane plantation. He kept collecting taxes until December 1793, when he left for political pressure for supposedly hiding his real profits from the Government.

José Florencio Fernández de Lima del Castillo Jáuregui y Barragán Trejo Sáenz y Torres, son of Felipe Barragán, married an indigenous woman, Rita de Aguilar, thus creating conflicts with his father. He joined the militias to become independent. Despite that, he did receive inheritance from his father and used the money for his social ascension. In 1780, he became the leader of the Ríoverde mail system and kept serving the crown through his military service, but he lived under the shadow of his father. After Felipe's death, most of his fortune was split amongst his six children and José became the leader of family business. During his time as head of the family, the Spanish Crown tightened their control over the region, and he kept serving as military, being nominated as lieutenant colonel. His family was also officially recognized by the Crown and he became a congressman of the Cortes of Cádiz, representing San Luis Potosí.

José didn't have any male inheritors, and his daughter married Paulo Verástegui, thus losing his surname. Felipe did have other children, but they created other family nucleus. Thus, the Fernández Barragán family ended in 1811, with José's death.

=== Notorious members ===
- Gabriel Barragán (1693–1761): Bandit, merchant and muleteer, responsible for the creation of the Fernández Barragán family in New Spain.
- Felipe Barragán (1733–1796): Captain, merchant and land owner, he became one of the richest men from New Spain.
- José Barragán (1758–1812): Military, leader of the Fernández Barragán family.

== Barragán Morales ==
=== History ===
In Monterrey, Mexico, the members of the Barragán family, also called Barragán Morales family, became millionaires. They entered on the drink business when Manuel L. Barragán founded Topo Chico in 1895 to sell mineral water. It became the first Mexican company to be allowed to sell Coca-Cola in the country, and eventually it became part of Grupo Procor.

In 2001, Grupo Procor fused itself with Grupo Arma, from Arizpe Narro family, and Grupo Argos, from Fernández family, to form Arca Continental, the second biggest Coca-Cola distributor from Mexico. The company kept growing, expanding their operations to the United States and South America. They also allied themselves with the Lindley family. The Barragán family is the biggest shareholder of the company, with 47.1%. Since then, the family featured on Forbes as one of the richest families from Mexico, reaching the 14th place in 2023.

=== Notorious members ===
- Manuel L. Barragán (1888–1980): Founder of the International Red Cross and Red Crescent Movement and creator of Topo Chico.
- Miguel Carlos Barragán (1932–2025): Creator of Bebidas Mundiales and vice-president of the Regional Council of the Bank of Mexico.
- Manuel Barragán Morales (born in 1951): Borard member of Arca Continental, responsible for the distribution of Coca-Cola in the United States.
