= Mauricio Lasansky =

Argentine artist & educator (1914–2012)

- Born: Mauricio Leib Lasansky; October 12, 1914; Buenos Aires, Argentina
- Died: April 2, 2012 (aged 97); Iowa City, Iowa, U.S.
- Known for: Printmaking and Drawing
- Notable work: The Nazi Drawings
- Movement: American modernism
- Spouse: Emilia Barragán Lasansky (m. 1937)
- Awards: Five Guggenheim Fellowship (1943, 1944, 1945, 1953, 1964)
- Website: lasanskyart.com

Mauricio Leib Lasansky (October 12, 1914 – April 2, 2012) was an Argentine artist and educator known both for his advanced techniques in intaglio printmaking and for a series of 33 pencil drawings from the 1960s titled "The Nazi Drawings." Lasansky, who migrated to and became a citizen of the United States, established the program in printmaking at the University of Iowa, which offered the first Master of Fine Arts program in the field in the United States. Sotheby's identifies him as one of the fathers of modern printmaking.

== Biography ==
The son of Eastern European Jews, Lasansky was born on 12 October 1914 in Buenos Aires. He studied printmaking and engraving from his Polish father, who had made a living in those fields. He displayed early promise, showing favorably at the Mutulidad Fine Arts Exhibition with an honorable mention at 16 and a prize at 17 for sculpture. He entered the Superior School of Fine Arts in his hometown in 1933 and later met young Argentine Luis Barragán (painter). Three years later, Lasansky began his career as director of the Free Fine Arts School in Villa María, Argentina. Through school and the decade he held this directorship, he exhibited extensively, culminating in a solo retrospective exhibition at the Galleria Muller in Buenos Aires in 1943.

Lasansky relocated to New York City in 1943 on the first of five Guggenheim Fellowships and chose to remain in and become a citizen of the United States for political reasons in spite of a lack of financial resources and challenges with the English language. In 1945, he took his first position at the University of Iowa, as a visiting lecturer for graphic arts. Within three years, he would become a full professor and ultimately would establish its program in printmaking, offering the first Master of Fine Arts program in the field in the United States.

In the 1960s, Time magazine dubbed him "the nation's most influential printmaker." He remained with the program until his retirement in 1984, whereafter he continued as a practicing artist. Susan Hale Kemenyffy was among his pupils.

Lasansky wed in 1937, bringing his family with him to the United States at the time of his second Guggenheim Fellowship, in 1944.

== Work ==
Lasansky's work in his Argentinian period was primarily drypoint, with additional forays in etching, relief etching and linoleum cut. Lacking exposure to other printmakers, he developed innovative approaches to copper plate printmaking. He dedicated his first several months in the United States to studying the extensive print collection of the Metropolitan Museum of Art, experimenting with modern art techniques in his own work at Atelier 17 in New York, absorbing techniques in intaglio and investigating particularly the work of Picasso, who was a major influence. Other influences cited include El Greco, Goya, Modigliani, Chagall and Stanley William Hayter. He was an innovator in the creation of large metal-plate artwork, sometimes combining more than 50 plates to produce a single image.

In addition to his printmaking, Lasansky is known for the series "The Nazi Drawings". Produced between 1961 and 1966, these 33 drawings were inspired by what Lasansky described as the "unleashing of brutality" of the Holocaust. The series was first exhibited in the Whitney Museum of Art for its opening in 1967. The drawings, on regular paper with graphite pencil and watercolor washes meant to suggest blood, portrayed the victims and perpetrators of the atrocities of the Holocaust, but also the bystanders, whom Lasansky felt strongly bore a share of responsibility. As of Lasansky's death in 2012, the images were on exhibit at the University of Iowa Museum as a long-term loan.

== Honors and recognition ==
- 1943: Guggenheim Fellowship
- 1944: Guggenheim Fellowship
- 1945: Guggenheim Fellowship
- 1953: Guggenheim Fellowship
- 1959: Honorary Doctorate, Iowa Wesley College
- 1963: Guggenheim Fellowship
- 1969: Honorary Doctorate, Pacific Lutheran University
- 1979: Honorary Doctorate, Carleton College
- 1980: Distinguished Teaching of Art Award, College Art Association
- 1983: Honorary Award in Arts & Humanities, Commission for the Aging
- 1985: Honorary Doctorate, Coe College
- 1990: Academician, National Academy of Arts & Design, New York
- 1999: Iowa Award, 14th Recipient
