= Luis Carlos Barragán =

Colombian Sci-fi writer (born 1988)

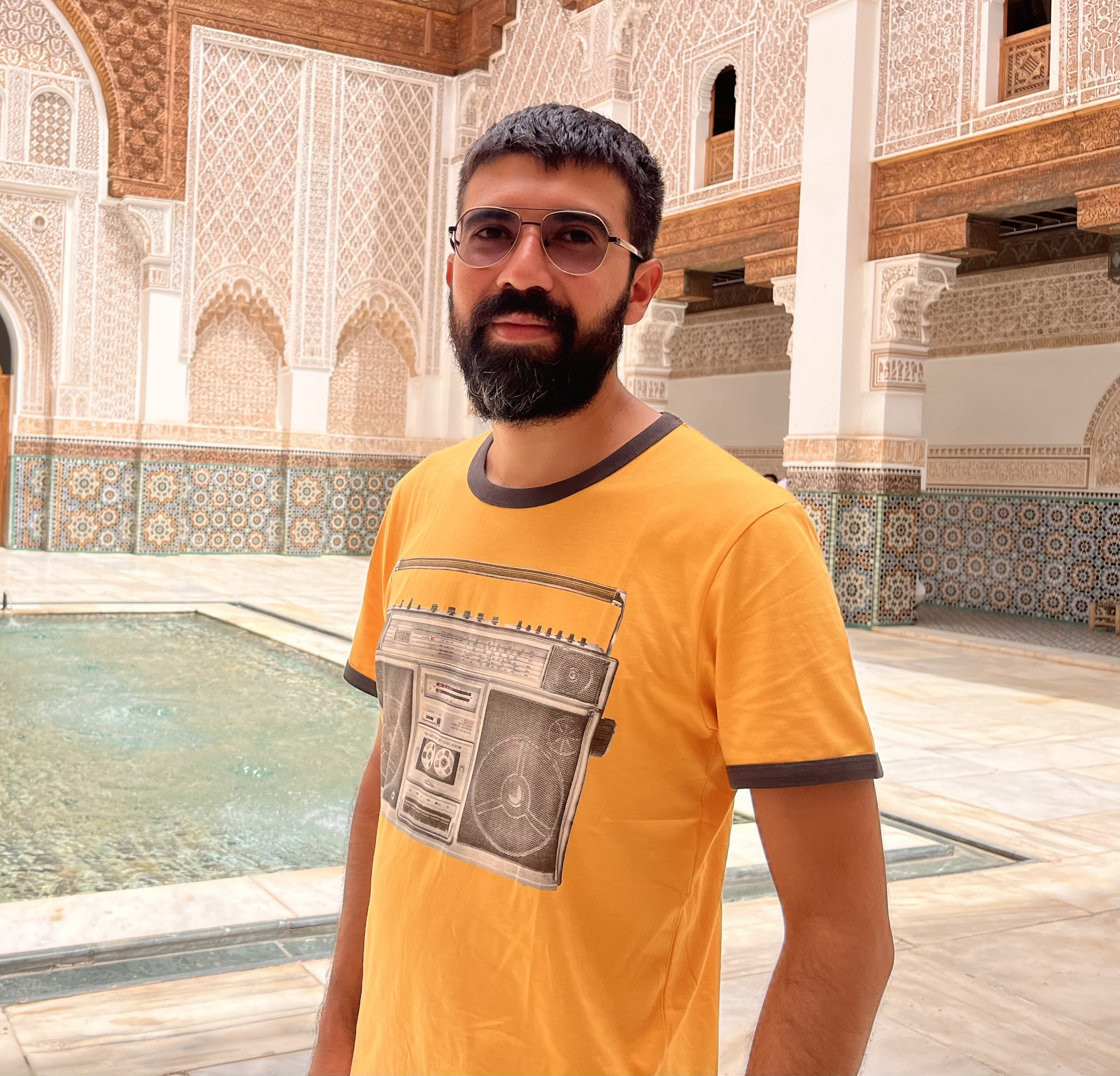
- Barragán at Ben Youssef Madrasa in 2023
- Born: Luis Carlos Barragán Castro; 1 September 1988 (age 38); Bogotá, Colombia
- Education: National University of Colombia; American University in Cairo
- Occupations: Writer; artist; historian
- Writing career
- Language: Spanish
- Years active: 2011–present
- Genres: Sci-fi; New weird

Luis Carlos Barragán Castro (born 1 September 1988) is a Colombian writer and illustrator specialized in science fiction.

== Life and career ==
Luis Carlos Barragán was born on 1 September 1988 in Bogotá, Colombia. He got his bachelor's degree in Fine Arts at the National University of Colombia in 2011. In the same year, his debut novel Vagabunda Bogotá was published, winning multiple awards, and nominated as a finalist for the Rómulo Gallegos Prize in 2013.

He got his master's degree in Arabic Studies at the American University in Cairo in 2018 with his thesis "Tropical Mudejar: Mosque-type chapels in Mexico and their role in early Spanish America" which has won the George T. Scanlon Graduate Student Award in Arab and Islamic Civilizations Department, a merit-based award to recognize a distinguished MA thesis produced by an ARIC student in that given academic year. In the same year, his second novel El Gusano was published, also winning multiple awards.

He has published and contributed numerous short stories and artworks in various sci-fi magazines across the Ibero-America. In 2021, his first short story collection Parásitos Perfectos and third novel Tierra Contrafuturo were published.

He was a background painter for the 2022 animation film The Other Shape and the art director of the virtual reality experience "Codice Futuro" which premiered in 2024.

== Style and themes ==
Luis Carlos Barragán is known for using science fiction, New Weird, body horror and surrealism in his novels and stories, and for uniting these themes with Colombian reality.

== Bibliography ==
=== Novels ===
- Vagabunda Bogotá (2011)
- El Gusano (2018)
- Tierra Contrafuturo (2021)

=== Short story collection ===
- Parásitos Perfectos (2021)
