= Juan Carlos Barragán =

Mexican politician

- Born: 19 May 1973 (age 53); Michoacán, Mexico
- Occupation: Politician
- Political party: MORENA

Juan Carlos Barragán Vélez (born 19 May 1973) is a Mexican politician from the Morena Party. El candidato mejor evaluado (según sus encuestas) para la presidencia de Morelia]. in 2020, polls published by the media identified him as "The best evaluated candidate for the presidency of Morelia]". [1] He has developed in various public and political positions.

His first public positions in Michoacán were: in the Ministry of Communications and Public Works of the government of the state of Michoacán, assistant secretary of the holder. 2002-2004. Later, politically he served in the Party of the Democratic Revolution (PRD), secretary of municipal affairs, municipal executive committee of Morelia 2005-2008.

His first municipal position was from 2008 to 2011 in the H. Ayuntamiento de Morelia Michoacán as councilor. He held a seat in the Chamber of Deputies of the Union Congress, being a federal deputy of the LX legislature.

Subsequently, Barragán Vélez was summoned to work in the Coyoacán Delegation, as general director of economic and technological development and economic development in 2012, and it was in the same Coyoacán Delegation that he served as private secretary of the delegation chief during 2013 .

Upon the arrival of the state government 2015 - 2021 in Michoacán, he was appointed head of the Institute of training for work of the state of Michoacán (ICATMI), where he was director general until 2016. Upon his departure from ICATMI, and for the good performance in the educational area, he joined directly the Ministry of Education of the Government of the State of Michoacán, being appointed director of initial training and teacher professionalization, a position he held from 2016 to 2017.

Later, Barragán joined the Telebachillerato Michoacán, as general director where he promoted upper secondary education. Once his work at the Michoacán Telebachillerato concluded, he was assigned the appointment of Head of the Secretariat of Social and Human Development of the Government of the State of Michoacán [1], where he fulfilled his task as secretary until September 2020, at which time he presented his resignation to fully join the work of the citizen organization MANO A MANO "Building Citizenship", which he has led since its creation in 2011.

== EDUCATION ==
UNIVERSIDAD MICHOACANA DE SAN NICOLÁS DE HIDALGO BA IN LAW AND SOCIAL SCIENCES.

Among the achievements made in university life, the following were occupying the positions of student representation:

- President of the Student Council at José Ma. Morelos High School.

- Secretary General of the Student Council of the Faculty of Law and Social Sciences.

- President of the Student Council of the Faculty of Law and Social Sciences.

- Founding Member of the University Left Student Organization of the UMSNH
