= Quintanaortuño =

Coordinates: 42°27′N 3°41′W

- Municipality and town
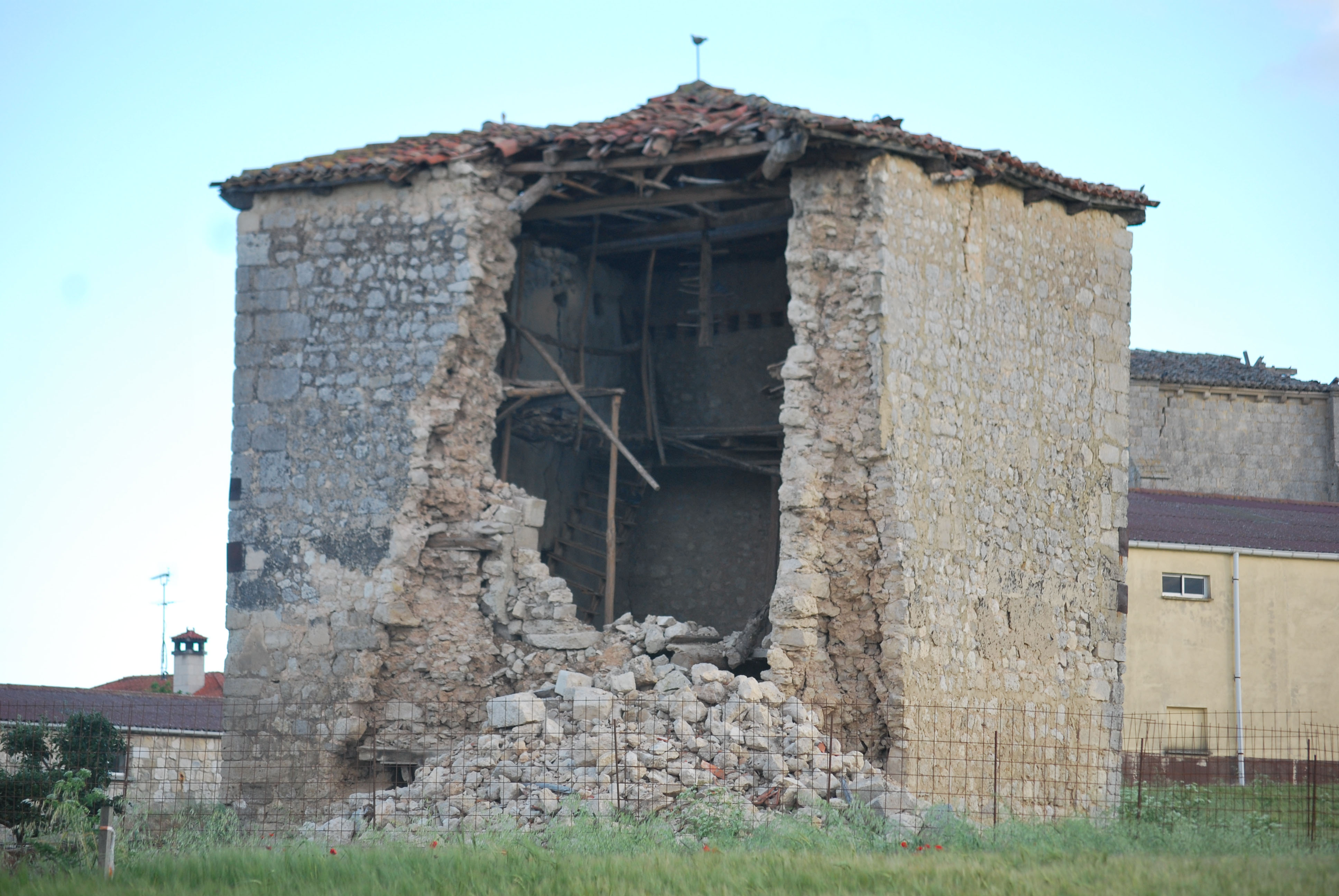
- Tower of Quintanaortuño (16th century).

- Flag Coat of arms
- Interactive map of Quintanaortuño
- Country: Spain
- Autonomous community: Castile and León
- Province: Burgos
- Comarca: Alfoz de Burgos

Area
  - Total: 5.54 km^{2} (2.14 sq mi)
- Elevation: 877 m (2,877 ft)

Population (2025-01-01)
  - Total: 297
  - Density: 53.6/km^{2} (139/sq mi)
- Time zone: UTC+1 (CET)
  - Summer (DST): UTC+2 (CEST)
- Postal code: 09140
- Website: http://www.quintanaortuño.es/

Quintanaortuño is a municipality and town located in the province of Burgos, Castile and León, Spain. According to the 2004 census (INE), the municipality has a population of 163 inhabitants.
