= Armazine =

Type of corded silk used for women's gowns and men's waistcoats

Armazine was a type of corded silk used for women's gowns and men's waistcoats, first known from the Elizabethan era. It was also called armoisine, armozine and ermozine.

The European armazine was a plain black color. Colorful East Indian armazine was said to be "slighter than those made in Europe and of an inferior quality. Their colours, and particularly the crimson and red, are commonly false, and they have but little gloss, and no brightness at all". The European centres of manufacture were Lyon and Italy.

Ribbed armazine in the 19th century was heavier and used for coverlets, curtains and portières. The thick black corded silk ("a kind of taffeta") was used for "scholastic gowns, and for hatbands and scarves".
