= Arca Continental =

Mexican multinational company

Arca Continental S.A.B. de C.V.
- Company type: Public Company
- Traded as: BMV: AC
- Industry: Beverages Food
- Headquarters: Monterrey, Mexico
- Area served: Mexico; United States; Ecuador; Argentina; Peru
- Key people: Jorge Humberto Santos Reyna (Chairman); Arturo Gutiérrez Hernández (CEO)
- Products: Beverages under The Coca-Cola Company Brand; Snacks
- Number of employees: 62,000
- Website: www.arcacontal.com

Arca Continental is a Mexican multinational company that produces, distributes and markets beverages under the Coca-Cola Company brand, as well as snacks under the Bokados brand in Mexico, Inalecsa in Ecuador and Wise and Deep River in the United States.

Arca Continental is the second-largest Coca-Cola bottler in Latin America. The company serves around 123 million people in the northern and western regions of Mexico as well as in Ecuador, Peru, the northern region of Argentina and the southwestern regions of United States.

In 2012 Arca Continental acquired Wise Foods and Inalecsa.

== History ==
=== Arca ===
Arca was created in 2001 as a merger of 3 established bottlers in Mexico: Argos, Arma, and Procor, controlled respectively by the Fernández family, Arizpe Narro family and Barragán family. This merger made the second-largest Coca-Cola bottler in Mexico. At that time, the company distributed its products only in northern Mexico.

=== Merger with Continental ===
In 2011, Arca and Grupo Continental—a Coca-Cola bottler headquartered in Tampico, Tamaulipas—agreed to merge into Arca Continental. Estimates at the time of the merger suggested that sales would be about 1.2bn.

=== Acquisitions ===
Embotelladoras Arca Continental grew during the 2000s by acquiring companies in Mexico, Argentina, and Ecuador. In 2017, Arca Continental announced the closing of a transaction with the Coca-Cola Company to acquire Great Plains Coca-Cola Bottling Company through its subsidiary Coca-Cola Southwest Beverages. This acquisition operates in some areas of the southwestern United States, including Texas, parts of Oklahoma, New Mexico, and Arkansas.

=== New plant ===
In May 2018, Arca Continental announced the construction of the first new bottling plant in the United States in over a decade. The new $250 million plant has been fully operational since March 2020.
