= Steven Kemenyffy =

American artist

Steven Kemenyffy (born 1943, Budapest, Hungary) is an American ceramic artist living and working in Pennsylvania. He is most recognized for his contributions to the development of the American ceramic raku tradition. Beginning in 1969, he served as a Professor of Ceramic Art at Edinboro University of Pennsylvania (formerly Edinboro State College). He retired from teaching after forty years, but continues to produce artwork at his home studio in McKean, Pennsylvania.

== Biography ==
Kemenyffy was born in Budapest, Hungary in 1943. His father was serving in the war effort during his birth, and Kemenyffy and his mother would not be reunited with his father until 1949. During the interim, Kemmenyffy and his mother lived with an aunt, Margit Gosztonyi, who worked as a potter in Baden-Baden, Germany. The family immigrated to the United States as displaced citizens under the sponsorship of a Presbyterian Church in Rock Island, Illinois in 1951. In the United States, Kemenyffy's mother served as a seamstress and his father worked as an engineer with a surveying company. Kemenyffy lived in Rock Island until 1964, having earned a bachelor's of science in mathematics at nearby Augustana College.

Kemenyffy's interest in becoming a ceramic artist began shortly after college when he attended a Peter Voulkos workshop. He then began ceramic studies at the University of Iowa where he met his future wife and artistic collaborator, Susan. In 1967, he received a Master of Fine Arts in ceramics, and she received an MFA in printmaking. They wed in 1970. After receiving his MFA, Steven taught at multiple institutions, including the University of Wisconsin-Whitewater, School of the Art Institute of Chicago, University of Colorado at Boulder, Penland School of Crafts, and Haystack Mountain School of Crafts. Kemenyffy began teaching at Edinboro University of Pennsylvania in 1969, until his retirement in 2009.

== Work ==
Kemenyffy is often characterized in regard to his contributions to American experimental ceramics of the late 1960s and early 1970s. More specifically, Kemenyffy's contributions to American raku techniques are often cited. Kemenyffy has stated that his interest in raku came out of practical considerations, as he and Susan: "... were doing a variety of workshops in a variety of different media. Raku was always an official way of making pieces in a short period of time…In raku it seems to compress all the firings into one."

Kemenyffy, himself, describes his early work as "Biomorphic forms alluding to old ceramic traditions such as tiles, vases, and containers." These works were often in excess of six feet tall and many times included mixed media elements. In 1974, Kemenyffy wrote about the work he was producing; "For several years now, my work has dealt with certain formal considerations. Chief among these is using clay in such a way as to crystallize the moment and permanentize the impermanent. These have been among the primary concerns of all potters since the earliest times."

For much of Kemenyffy's career, he has worked in tandem with his wife, Susan. In 1987, she stated about their collaborative works: "Steven is the [sculptor], I am the drawer. These works would not exist if it weren't for the sculpture; if it weren't for the clay. The clay entity comes first and my drawings come second." James Paul Thompson further clarifies this relationship (as observed in 1987): "Steven Kemenyffy uses patterns as a point of departure for his work, while Susan Kemenyffy allows the people and things around her to become partial inspiration in addition to what Steven gives her."

Kemenyffy's work is in the collection of the Smithsonian American Art Museum.
