= Susan Hale Kemenyffy =

American artist (born 1941)

- Born: Susan B. Hale; 1941 (age 84–85); Springfield, Massachusetts, U.S.
- Education: Syracuse University (BFA); University of Iowa (MA, MFA)
- Occupation: Artist
- Spouse: Steven Kemenyffy
- Children: 1
- Website: susankemenyffy.com

Susan Hale Kemenyffy (born 1941) is an American artist who works primarily in drawing and print media. She is known for the innovative raku art she created in collaboration with her husband Steven Kemenyffy.

== Biography ==
Susan B. Hale was born in Springfield, Massachusetts. She received a Bachelor of Fine Arts degree from Syracuse University in 1963. She studied at The Art Student's League, Woodstock, New York and at the University of Illinois, Champaign. In 1966, she received a Master of Arts degree from the University of Iowa; The following year she studied with Mauricio Lasansky and earned a Master of Fine Arts degree with honors.

She received a grant from the National Endowment for the Arts in 1973; among her awards are the Associated Artists of Pittsburgh award from Carnegie Mellon University Museum (1981, 1983, and 1987) and the Annual Ceramic and Small Sculpture Show award from the Butler Institute of American Art (1982). She has lectured widely. The Canton Museum of Art, the Cincinnati Art Museum, the Erie Art Museum, and the Everson Museum are among the institutions holding examples of her work, as is the Renwick Gallery of the Smithsonian Institution. In 2012, she was named Pennsylvania's Artist of the Year. She is married to ceramist Steven Kemenyffy, with whom she lives in McKean, Pennsylvania. She has a daughter, Maya (born 1970).

She is actively involved in her community, having served as President of Erie Art Museum 1985-88, Pennsylvania Council on the Arts Chair, 1997-2001, Advisory Council Erie Community Foundation Chair 2006-2008, Erie Community Foundation Trustee 2008-2017, and a long-time member of Garden Club of America / Carrie T. Watson Garden Club. She donated designs and works of art for public spaces in Maine and Pennsylvania.

== Work ==
Although she is primarily a graphic artist, Kemenyffy made important contributions to American ceramics in the late 1960s and early 1970s, particularly in regard to experimental raku techniques. She explained in an interview, "He was doing a lot of ceramics and he hated doing the surfaces...so he said why don't you keep drawing on some of these pieces and this is how we started." Steven Kemenyffy stated that their interest in raku came out of practical considerations: "We [Steven and Susan] were doing a variety of workshops in a variety of different media. Raku was always an official way of making pieces in a short period of time…In raku it seems to compress all the firings into one."

For much of Kemenyffy's career, she has worked in tandem with her husband Steven Kemenyffy. In 1987, she stated about their collaborative works: "Steven is the [sculptor], I am the drawer. These works would not exist if it weren’t for the sculpture; if it weren't for the clay. The clay entity comes first and my drawings come second." James Paul Thompson further clarifies this relationship (as observed in 1987): "Steven Kemenyffy uses patterns as a point of departure for his work, while Susan Kemenyffy allows the people and things around her to become partial inspiration in addition to what Steven gives her."

== Selected collections ==
- The Smithsonian Institution, Washington, D.C.
- Mr. Raku Kichizaemon, Kyoto, Japan
- The Carnegie Museum, Pittsburgh, PA
- The International Ceramic Museum, Kecskemet, Hungary
- The Philadelphia Museum of Art, Philadelphia PA
- The Everson Museum of Art, Syracuse, NY
- Cincinnati Art Museum, Cincinnati, OH
- Kaiser Permanente Medical Center, Irvine, CA
- Ubukata Industries Company, Inc., Nagoya, Japan
- The Kemper Insurance Company, Long Grove, IL & Osaka, Japan
- Rohm and Haas, Philadelphia, PA

== Selected exhibitions ==
- St. Joseph's Chapel, Multi wool rugs, Alexandria, Egypt 2007
- The Square Root of Drawing', An international drawing invitational, Temple Bar Gallery, Dublin, Ireland 2006
- 'A Sense of Place', An 1800 square foot, 7 color linoleum drawing, installed as a theater foyer floor, at the Tom Ridge Environmental Center, Erie PA 2003-2006
- 'The Garden of Knowledge', A 2300 square foot, 8 color linoleum drawing, installed as the foyer floor of Harding Elementary School, Erie, PA 2002
- 'Raku-investigations into fire', Scottish Gallery, Edinboro, Scotland 2002; Rufford Craft Center, Nottinghamshire, England 2000
- 'Ceramics from 5 Continents' - Exhibition from the collection of the International Ceramic Studio (Kecskemet, Hungary)’, Royal Castle - Godoll, Hungary 2000;
- Lerchenborg Slot - Kalundborg, Denmark 1999
- Hungarian Cultural Institute, Stuttgart, Germany 1998; Hufingen, Germany 1998
- 'Pittsburgh Collects Clay', Carnegie Museum of Art, Pittsburgh, PA 1998
- 'Keramia Fesztival', Vigado Galeria, Budapest, Hungary 1997
- 'Nemzetkozi Szimpozium ‘97', Tolgyfa Galeria, Budapest, Hungary 1997
- Tracey (Contemporary Drawing Issues - Sketchbook); (5 Sketchbooks: Rome; Prague; Out & About; 8 Ways & Back; Hungary), Loughborough University School of Art & Design, Loughborough, Leicestershire, UK, 2002 (online exhibit)
- 12th San Angelo National Ceramic Competition; San Angelo Museum of Fine Arts, San Angelo, TX 1998
- The 4th International Ceramics Competition, Mino, Japan 1995
- Erie Art Museum Annual Spring Exhibition, Erie, PA 2003, 2002, 1994, 1990, 1986, 1980, 1973-1970
- Annual Exhibition, the Associated Artists of Pittsburgh, Carnegie Museum of Art, Pittsburgh, PA 1998, 1993-1990, 1988, 1987 (Award), 1983 (Award), 1982-1978

== Selected lectures and workshops ==
- The Potters' Council, Keynote Speaker, 'Drawing: a Life', Indianapolis, IN 2008
- Loughborough University School of Art & Design, 'Drawing: As You Will', Leicestershire, UK 2007
- The University of Applied Arts & Crafts, ‘The Artist & Community’, Prague, the Czech Republic 2001
- The International Ceramic Studio, ‘The Artist & Community’ Kecskemet, Hungary 2001
- Chatham Green: The Art of the Garden Symposium: ‘The Gardens & Sculpture of Raku Place’, Chatham College Pittsburgh, PA 2001
- Tile Heritage Foundation Symposium, ‘Raku Tiles’, Raku Place McKean, PA 1999 (workshop); 'The Making of the East High Mural', East High School, Erie, PA (lecture) 1999
- Colonial Williamsburg, the National Gardening Symposium, "The Gardens of Raku Place", Williamsburg, VA 1996
- Renwick Gallery of the National Museum of American Art, Smithsonian Institution, Washington, D.C. 1991

== Publications ==
- Journal of the American Theater Organ Society, "The Blackwood Experience", Spring/Summer 2013
- Journal of the Print World, "Lasansky's Lessons", January 2013, pg. 19
- 'Drawing The Purpose', Essay: Landscape Drawing / Drawing Landscape, Published by Intellect Ltd., Bristol, UK 2008
- The First London Sketchbook, A melange of traveler's notations, edition 100, Gohr printing, Erie PA 2007
- KEMENYFFY, 2nd Edition, an 'As You Will' presentation of the artist's drawings, 2007
- Leap Frog! The Ribbitting Tale, by Vanessa Weibler Paris; ISBN 0-9709282-8-9, 2004 by the Erie Art Museum, pp. 48-49
- The Craft and Art of Clay, by Susan Peterson, Prentice Hall, Englewood Cliffs, NJ 2003, 1999, 1996, 1992
- Painted Clay, Graphic Arts & the Ceramic Surface, by Paul Scott, A&C Black, England; Watson Guptill, NY 2001
- Tile Heritage, A Review of American Tile History, Volume 6 #1 Winter 2000-01, 'The Making of the East High Tile Mural', Erie, PA, pp. 21–25 by Susan Kemenyffy
- Contemporary Ceramics, by Susan Peterson, Watson Guptill, USA, Laurence King (Thames & Hudson), Great Britain, 2000
- Raku: investigations into fire, by David Jones, The Crowood Press Ltd, Ramsbury, Marlborough, Wiltshire, England, 1999
- Contemporary Ceramic Tile Art, by DeBorah Goletz, Schiffer Publishing, March/April 2000, pg. 27, Waterford, VA
- The International Magazine of Ceramics - Ceramic Review, "Under Fire - a critical look at contemporary Raku & its broad international interpretations" by Nicholas Lees, London, England (Issue number 178, pp. 20-21, July/August 1999)
- Surface Design, The Journal of the S. D. Association, "Designing the World", Essay by Susan Kemenyffy, Vol. 22 No. 4 Summer 1998, Cover & Page 34
- Pennsylvania Council on the Arts - Fellowship Catalogue-Introduction, by Susan Kemenyffy, Harrisburg, PA 1997, 1998, 1999
