= Julio Barragán =

Argentine painter

- Born: 1928; Buenos Aires
- Died: 14 January 2011; Almagro, Buenos Aires
- Writing career
- Period: 1946–2005
- Genres: Concrete art Cubism

Puerto (oil on canvas, 1974).

Julio Barragán (1928 – 14 January 2011) was an Argentine painter of the Concretist and Cubist schools.

== Life and work ==
Barragán was born in Buenos Aires. He began studying art at age 12, creating reproductions of Renaissance art masters such as El Greco. He studied at the National School of Ceramics, where he graduated in 1945 with a technical degree and met his future wife, María de las Nieves Adeff (born 1926). Adeff later became an accomplished potter.

His work was first exhibited at the National Fine Arts Exhibition in 1946. His early work was Realist, and he rejected the contemporary genres that had already marked the careers of, among others, his elder brother, Luis Barragán.

Barragán traveled to Paris, France, in the late 1940s, however, and was influenced by Georges Braque and Pablo Picasso. He joined the "Twenty Painters and Sculptors" group with his brother, Bruno Venier, and Oscar Capristo, among others. The group, active in Argentina between 1952 and 1963, exhibited works in a number of Abstract genres, although Julio Barragán's Concrete phase contrasted with much of the group's more surreal work. His style of painting then shifted to Cubism, adopting a chiaroscuro tone that would become his trademark. The landscapes and cityscapes he painted in subsequent decades were marked by Cubist and Impressionist influences. These became his best-known works, and to meet growing demand, he adopted an "assembly line" routine at his Villa Urquiza atelier, whereby several easels were assembled in a row that allowed Barragán to alternate randomly from one work to another.

Barragán's work was exhibited in most of the nation's leading art galleries, including the Gutiérrez y Guad, Sotheby's, Wildenstein, and Witcomb galleries, as well as in the Eduardo Sívori Museum and others. His work earned the Braque Prize at the Buenos Aires Museum of Modern Art (1964), the Grand Prize in Painting at the Belgrano Municipal Salon (1970), and First Prizes at the National Salon in 1976 and 1978. Local art critic Mauricio Neuman described him as a "solitary aristocrat of beauty."

He retired from Buenos Aires' art shows in 2005, and died in his Almagro neighborhood home in 2011 at age 82.
