= Barragan (cloth) =

Spanish term for fabric

Barragan (barragon) was a Spanish term for various types of fabrics or fabric products in the Middle Ages. Barragan was derived from the Arabic term barrakan, that signified heavy cotton and woolen materials. Initially meaning a heavy cloth, by the 15th century it had come to mean a luxurious cloth made of silk. Along with terms such as almuzalla, fazale, and mobatana, barragan was also used to mean a type of table- or altar-cloth. In the 17th century, the term was revived to mean a twill weave woolen material similar to moleskin.

== See also ==
- Fustian
- Almerían silk
