= Manuel Garrido =

Argentine deputy

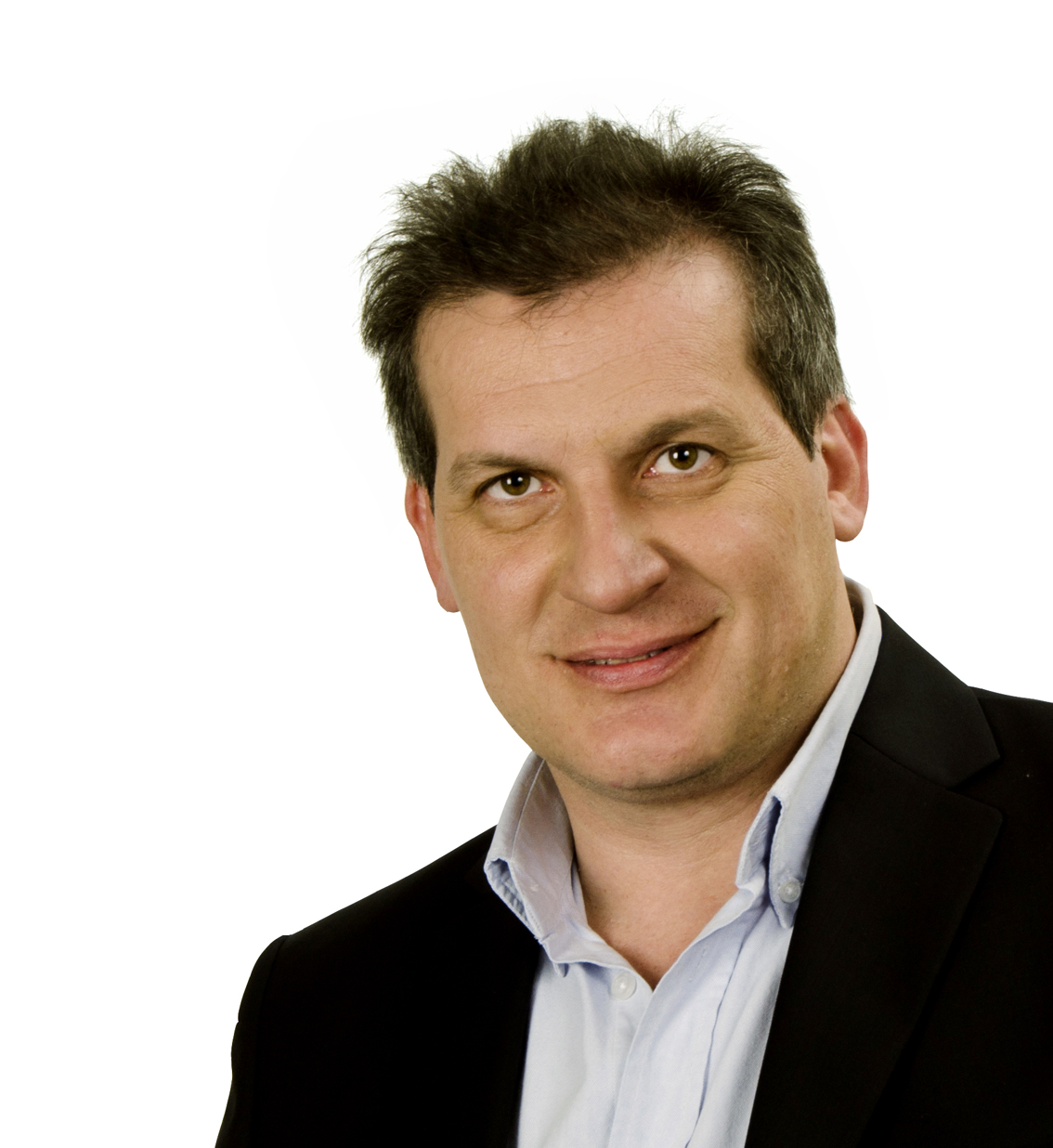
Manuel Garrido

Manuel Garrido (born 1964) is an Argentine politician, who served as a member of the Chamber of Deputies for the City of Buenos Aires. He belongs to the Radical Civic Union (UCR).
