= Banco Alas =

Argentine bank

Banco Alas Cooperativo Limitado was a commercial bank based in Buenos Aires, Argentina.

Inaugurated in 1979, Banco Alas became one of the first to offer ATM services in the country. The bank prospered initially, growing to include 76 branches, and over 1,200 employees. The collapse of much of the country's banking system on the heels of Argentina's Central Bank Circular 1050, which, in 1980, tied interest rates to the (rapidly increasing) value of the US dollar locally, as well as the subsequent Latin American debt crisis, which further stymied credit and the economy, led to the bank's decline.

The Central Bank reported in 1986 that it had been defrauded by Banco Alas for US$110 million in export credits; Banco Alas was the 13th largest private bank in the country at the time of its liquidation by the Central Bank. CEO Carmelo Stancato and Executive Vice-president Jorge Gaspar Duchini were convicted on September 9, 1988, of defrauding the Central Bank; as part of the plea bargain with Federal Prosecutor Patricio Evers, a probationary sentence was issued in return for their reimbursement of half the funds.

Attorneys for Stancato and Duchini unsuccessfully filed motions in Federal Court in 1997 and 2005 to have ongoing trials against them dismissed on grounds of expiration of statute of limitations.
