= Costa de Almería =

Coastal region of Spain

Coordinates: 36.8333°N 2.4333°W

Costa de Almería

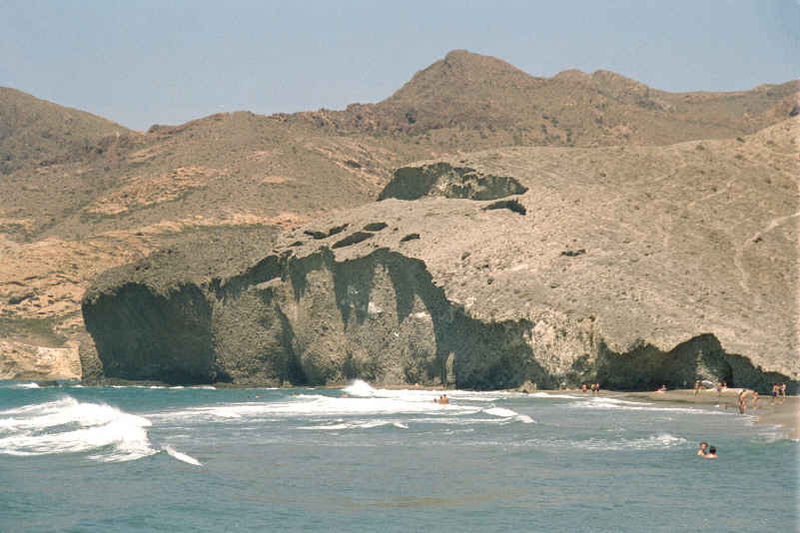
Playa de Mónsul, in the Cabo de Gata-Níjar Natural Park.

The Costa de Almería (Spanish: [ˈkosta ðe almeˈɾi.a], "Coast of Almería") is a coastal region of Spain consisting of the coastal municipalities of the province of Almería, in the autonomous community of Andalusia, Spain. The region extends 217 kilometres (135 mi) and includes 13 municipalities, from Pulpí on the border with the province of Murcia to Adra on the border with the province of Granada.

== Tourism ==
The name Costa de Almería is a term established for purposes of promoting tourism within the region. Beginning on 16 February 1928, tourism promoter Rodolfo Lussnigg began promoting the area under the name Costa del Sol; however, that name, originally referring specifically to the city of Almería, has since become attached to the coast of the province of Málaga.

Among the tourist destinations on the Costa de Almería are Vera, Mojácar, Roquetas de Mar and El Ejido, and such natural areas as the Cabo de Gata-Níjar Natural Park, the Punta Entinas-Sabinar Natural Park, and the Isla de Alborán.

== History ==
Almería has been home to different civilisations throughout its history. Significant traces of their presence can be seen in the archaeological remains scattered all over the province.

There is evidence of a very special prehistoric culture in Los Millares and el Argar. Phoenicians, Carthaginians and Greeks exploited its mines and traded up and down its coast. The Romans, who settled here in the 3rd century B.C., transformed it into "Porto Magnus" on the Mediterranean and dominated the area until the later arrival of the Visigoths in the 7th century. The Arabs created the current capital in the 10th century, and from here they ruled over one of the most important taifas (kingdoms) in Muslim Spain. The Arab influence was the most significant, as they remained in Spain for almost eight centuries. There are several monuments which bear witness to the fertile history of this land. The castles and fortresses provide an exceptional historic testimony for understanding the societies of the past.

Long exposed to border conflicts and the need to defend itself, the province of Almería has a large number and variety of castles which comprise a heritage known to few. The mining industry brought about an economic recovery in the 19th century.

== Landscape ==
The Sierra María-Los Vélez Nature Reserves with their castle, their caves and their rich fauna, and the Cabo de Gata-Níjar Natural Park, with its deserted beaches, wild cliffs and transparent sea beds, bring alive a landscape which offers the traveller the magic of snow, the Mediterranean forest, the desert and the sea.

== Coastal municipalities and comarcas ==
The municipalities that make up the Costa de Almería fall into three comarcas:

- Levante Almeriense is in the southeast of the province, adjacent to the province of Murcia, and includes the coastal municipalities of Níjar, Carboneras, Mojácar, Garrucha, Vera, Cuevas del Almanzora, and Pulpí, which includes most of the Cabo de Gata-Níjar Natural Park.
- The Comarca Metropolitana de Almería around the Bay of Almería includes the provincial capital Almería and the Isla de Alborán.
- Poniente Almeriense is in the southwest of the province, adjacent to the province of Granada, and includes the coastal municipalities of Adra, Berja, El Ejido, Roquetas de Mar, and Enix, which included most of the Punta Entinas-Sabinar Natural Park.

== List of beaches ==
=== Poniente Almeriense ===
==== Adra ====
- Playa de la Juana
- Playa de la Alcazaba
- Playa de Guainos
- Playa de Cala Junco
- Playa del Lance de la Vírgen
- Playa de la Gaviota
- Playa de la Caracola
- Playa de Poniente
- Playa de San Nicolás
- Playa de Censo
- Playa de la Habana

==== Berja ====
- Playa de Berja or Balanegra

==== El Ejido ====
- Playa de Balerma
- Playa de Piedra del Moro
- Playa de Los Baños or Guardias Viejas
- Playa de Almerimar or San Miguel Poniente
- Playa de Almerimar or San Miguel Levante
- Playa de Punta Entinas
- Playa de Cerrillos

==== Roquetas de Mar ====
- Playa de Aguadulce
- Playa de El Rompillo or Los Bajos
- Playa de Las Salinas or Los Baños
- Playa de La Romanilla
- Playa de La Bajadilla
- Playa de Urbanización Roquetas de Mar
- Playa Serena

==== Enix ====
- Playa del Palmer

=== Bahía de Almería ===
==== Almería ====
- Playa de la Garrofa
- Playa de San Telmo
- Playa de las Olas
- Playa de San Miguel, Zapillo or Las Conchas
- Playa de Nueva Almería
- Playa del Bobar or La Cañada
- Playa de Costa Cabana
- Playa del Perdigal or Alquián
- Playa del Toyo
- Playa de Retamar
- Playa de Torregarcía
- Playa de las Amoladeras
- Playa del Charco
- Playa de San Miguel de Cabo de Gata
- Playa de las Salinas de Cabo de Gata
- Playa de la Almadraba de Monteleva
- Playa de la Fabriquilla

==== Níjar ====
- Cala del Corralete
- Fondeadero de Cabo de Gata
- Cala Arena
- Cala Rajá
- Cala Carbón
- Cala de la Media Luna
- Cala Chica
- Cala del Príncipe
- Cala de los Amarillos
- Playa de Mónsul
- Playa de San José
- Playa de Cala Higuera
- Playa del Arco or Los Escullos
- Playa de Peñón Blanco or Isleta del Moro
- Playa de Cala del Carnaje
- Cala de la Polacra – Las Negras
- Cala del Cuervo
- Playa de Las Negras
- Cala de San Pedro – Las Negras
- Cala del Plomo – Agua Amarga
- Cala de Enmedio – Agua Amarga
- Playa de Agua Amarga – Agua Amarga
- Playa de la Fabriquilla

=== Levante Almeriense ===
==== Carboneras ====
- Playa de los Muertos
- Playa de las Martinicas
- Playa de Los Barquicos or Los Cocones
- Playa del Lancón
- Playa de la Galera
- Playa del Algarrobico

==== Mojácar ====
- Playa de las Granatillas
- Playa del Sombrerico
- Playa del Castillo de Macenas
- Playa del Cantal
- Playa de Cueva del Lobo
- Playa del Descargador
- Playa de la Rumina
- Playa de Marina de la Torre

==== Garrucha ====
- Playa de Garrucha o Las Escobetas

==== Vera ====
- Playa de las Marinas
- Playa de Puerto Rey (Part Naturist beach)
- Playa del Playazo

==== Cuevas del Almanzora ====
- Playa de Quitapellejos o Palomares
- Playa de Fábrica del Duro
- Playa de Villaricos
- Playa de Cala de la Dolores
- Playa de Cala Invencible
- Playa de Peñón Cortado
- Playa de Embarcadero Viejo
- Playa de Cala Cristal
- Playa del Calón
- Playa de Cabezo Negro
- Playa de Cala Panizo
- Playa de Pozo del Esparto

==== Pulpí ====
- Playa de Los Nardos
- Playa de La Entrevista
- Playa de Calipso or de San Juan de los Terreros
- Playa de Mar Serena
- Playa de Mar Rabiosa
- Playa de Cala de la Tía Antonia
- Playa de Cala Cuartel
- Playa de la Carolina
- Playa de Cala Cerrada
