= Cabo de Gata =

Cape in Almería, Andalusia, Spain

- Cape
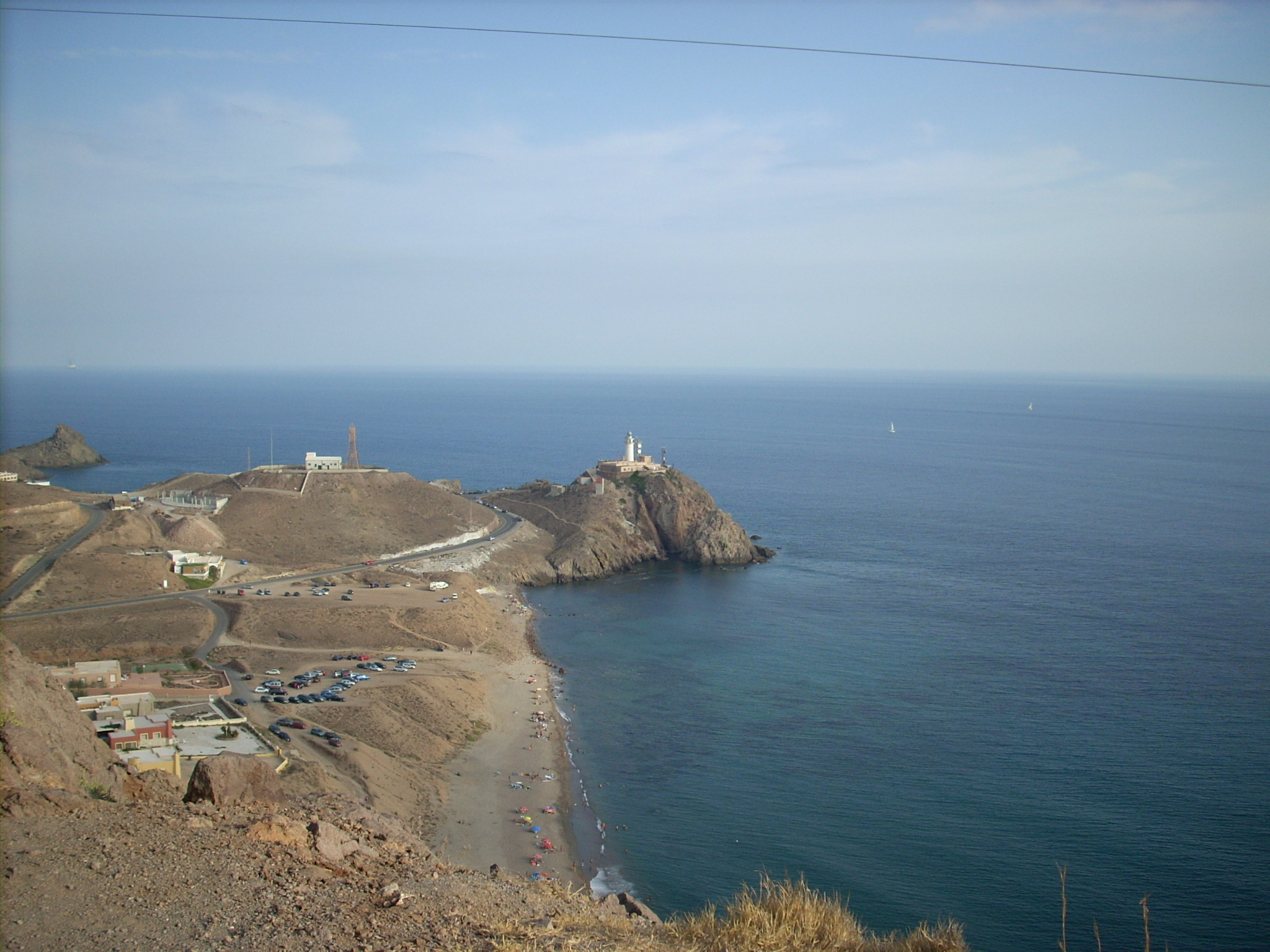
- Panoramic of Cabo de Gata

- Location within Spain
- Coordinates: 36°43′19″N 2°11′35″W
- Location: Níjar, Almería

Cabo de Gata (folk etymology, Cape of Cats) is a cape located in Níjar, Almería in the south of Spain, one of the biggest capes It is the driest place in the Iberian Peninsula, with an average annual precipitation of 150 to 170 mm (5.91 to 6.69 in) and a record low of 52 mm (2.05 in) in 1981. The area that it occupies is not considered a desert, even though the Tabernas Desert is nearby, 30 km (18.6 mi) to the northwest. The lowest temperature registered in Cabo de Gata was 0.0 °C (32.0 °F).

San José, Las Negras, Agua Amarga, Isleta del Moro, Rodalquilar, San Miguel, Almadraba de Moteleva, Fernán Pérez, Las Hortichuelas, Pozo de los Frailes, Los Escullos, Níjar and Carboneras are towns found in Cabo de Gata. The lighthouse is a famous landmark.

On 26 March 2008 it was declared a natural park as the Cabo de Gata-Níjar Natural Park.
