= Comarca Metropolitana de Almería =

- Comarca
- Location of Comarca Metropolitana de Almería in Andalusia, Spain

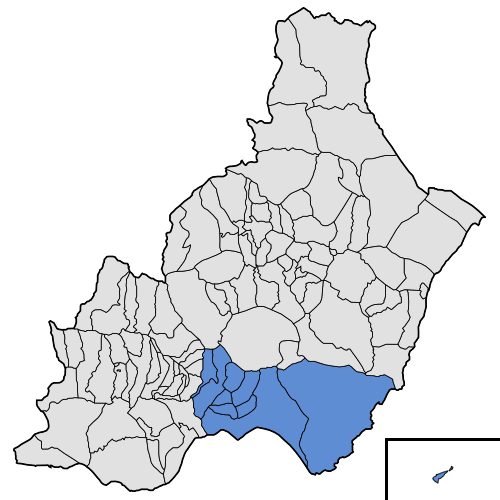
- Location of Comarca Metropolitana de Almería in the province of Almería
- Coordinates: 36°55′34″N 2°27′52″W
- Country: Spain
- Autonomous community: Andalusia
- Province: Almería

Area
  - Total: 1,159 km^{2} (447 sq mi)

Population (2024) (Note: Census at 1 January 2024: National Statistics Institute (Spain))
  - Total: 275,027
  - Density: 237.3/km^{2} (614.6/sq mi)

Comarca Metropolitana de Almería is one of the seven comarcas and metropolitan area in the province of Almería, Andalusia, Spain. This comarca was established in 2003 by the Government of Andalusia.

== Geography ==
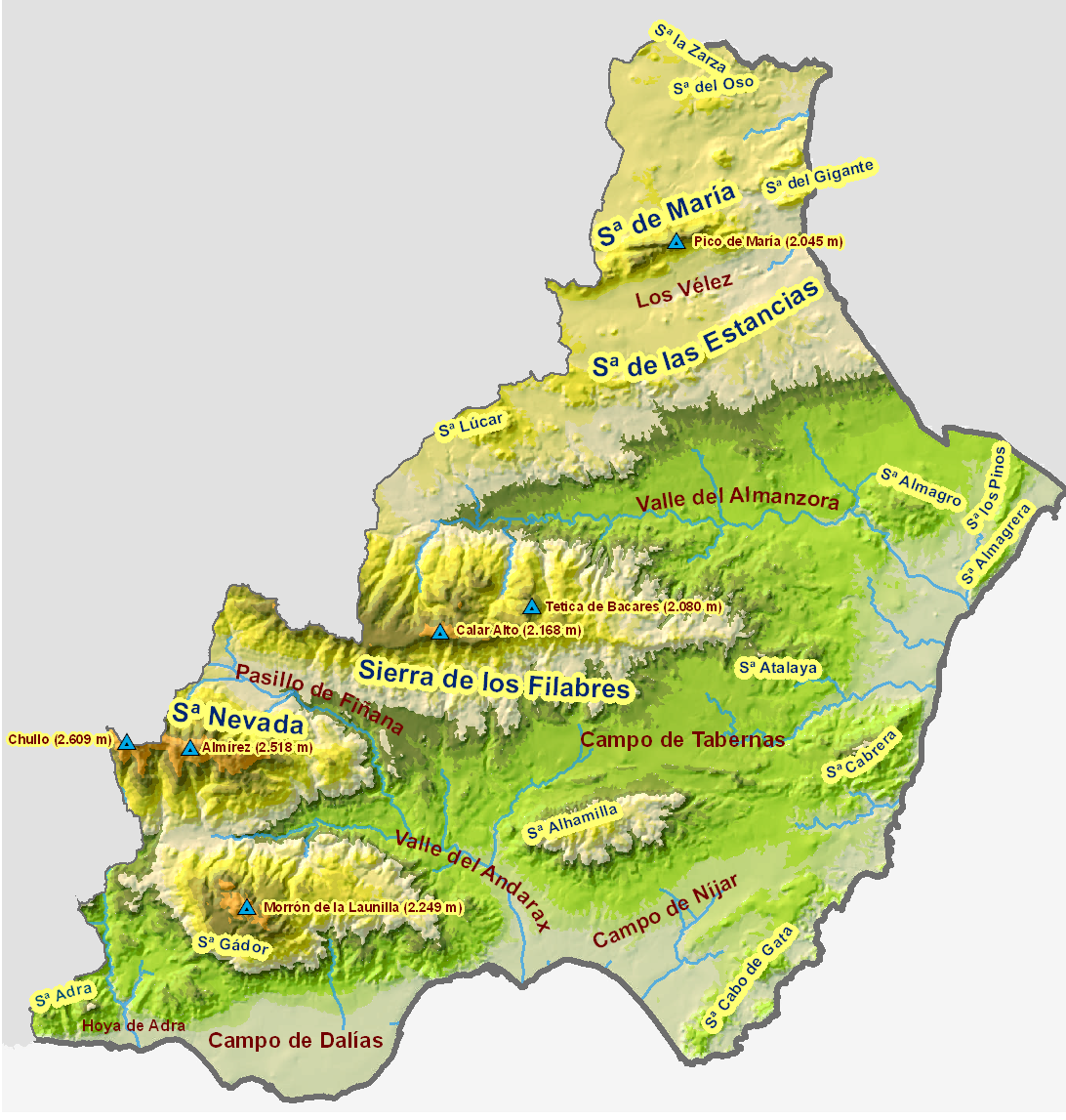
Geographic map of the province of Almería.

It is located in the southeast corner of the province, sharing borders with the comarcas of Poniente Almeriense and Alpujarra Almeriense to the west, Filabres-Tabernas and Levante Almeriense to the north. Its coastline characterizes by including the cape Cabo de Gata, which is the most southeastern point of the Iberian Peninsula. It contains the Cabo de Gata-Níjar Natural Park.

== Municipalities ==
It contains the following municipalities:

Arms	Municipality	Area (km^{2})	Population (2024) (Note: Census at 1 January 2024: National Statistics Institute (Spain))	Density (/km^{2})
	Almería	295.5	202,675	685.87
	Benahadux	16.60	4,808	289.64
	Gádor	87.60	3,067	35.01
	Huércal de Almería	20.91	18,584	888.76
	Níjar	599.41	33,076	55.18
	Pechina	46.02	4,463	96.98
	Rioja	36.38	1,589	43.68
	Sante Fe de Mondújar	34.84	494	14.18
	Viator	20.61	6,271	304.27
	Total	1,157.87	275,027	237.53
