= Antoñito Ruiz =

Spanish child actor and stuntman (born 1951)

- Born: Antonio Ruiz Escaño; 24 October 1951 (age 74); Málaga
- Occupations: Child actor and stuntman

Antonio Ruiz Escaño (born 24 October 1951), known as El Niño Leone, is a Spanish former child actor and stuntman.

He is known for playing Fernando in For a Few Dollars More (1965), and Stevens's youngest son in The Good, the Bad and the Ugly (1966), both directed by Sergio Leone. He has worked with Yul Brynner, Anthony Quinn, Charles Bronson, and Robert Mitchum.

In 2015, he attended the Almeria Western Film Festival. From 2016 and for the 50 anniversary of For a Few Dollars More, he directed a Spaghetti Western conference in Los Albaricoques, Níjar and recreated some scenes. He also recreated the scenes of The Good, the Bad and the Ugly in Cortijo del Fraile. It was attended by a hundred people. He was honoured in Sad Hill Cemetery.

== Selected filmography ==
- For a Few Dollars More (1965) as Fernando
- Dollars for a Fast Gun (1966)
- The Good, the Bad and the Ugly (1966) as Stevens' Youngest Son
- A Bullet for the General (1967) as Chico – Young Mexican at Train Station
- The Long Duel (1967) as Munnu
- Un día después de agosto (1968) as Folkloric Group Member
- Villa Rides (1968) as Juan
- Llego, veo, disparo (1968) as Postbag Carrier
- Massacre Harbor (1968) as Arab boy
