= Death to the Queen =

- Queen of Swords episode
- Dr Helm secretly frees the Queen
- Episode no.: Season 1 Episode 2
- Directed by: Jon Cassar
- Written by: Jocelyne Baroque-Simmons
- Cinematography by: Alwyn Kumst
- Production code: 102
- Original air date: October 14, 2000
- Running time: 44 minutes

Guest appearance
- Tacho Gonzalez as Don Gaspar Hidalgo

Episode chronology
← Previous "Destiny"	Next → "Fever"

"Death to the Queen" is the second episode of the syndicated television series Queen of Swords, airing October 14, 2000.

Colonel Montoya plots to kill The Queen when she attempts to find missing peasants he is using in a gold mine. Dr Helm arrives in Santa Helena and makes an impression on Tessa and meets the captured Queen of Swords.

== Credited cast ==
Cast as listed at the beginning and end of episode.

- Tessie Santiago as Tessa Alvarado/The Queen
- Anthony Lemke as Captain Marcus Grisham
- Elsa Pataky as Vera Hidalgo
- Peter Wingfield as Dr. Robert Helm
- Paulina Galvez as Marta the gipsy
- Valentine Pelka as Colonel Luis Ramirez Montoya
- Tacho Gonzales as Don Gaspar Hidalgo
- Christina Segovia as Louisa
- Javier Lago as Sergent Alonzo
- Lucas Fucia as Torlio
- Lucas Miguel Arranz as Arnaldo
- Cheucho Losanda as Pedro

== Plot ==
Colonel Montoya has a secret goldmine under the supervision of Captain Grisham and Sergeant Alonzo and is using peasant labor arrested under various false charges. Torlio, one of these laborers, is killed escaping. Santa Helena is awaiting a supply ship and the choice of food is limited. Tessa and Marta are shopping and Tessa is about to take the last apple when it is grabbed by a hungry stranger trail-weary after his journey from Texas. Words are exchanged only to be interrupted by Colonel Montoya who introduces the scruffy stranger as the new doctor, whose last name is Helm, for Santa Helena, much to Tessa's surprise, and on her journey home with Marta they vent their feelings about the first impressions of the new doctor. Very much revealing a secret interest, she admits to noticing that his eyes were green.

Arriving at the hacienda, Marta and Tessa are approached by Louisa, Torlio's wife, looking for her missing husband, and Tessa agrees to help. Tessa goes to Colonel Montoya office and his disinterest is manifested as he asks her to leave. Captain Grisham arrives to report the miners are sick, but Montoya insists he needs the gold to buy cannon from the expected supply ship. Grisham points out that the missing men will attract the attention of the Queen of Swords, but Montoya is expecting this and plans to kill the Queen.

More peasants are being transported by wagon from the jail but this time, under the observation of the Queen, who follows at a discreet distance. While in town Montoya is trying to get information from Dr Helm about treatment for sick men without giving away the secret mine. The Queen's pursuit of the wagon leads into a narrow ravine where she is ambushed by Captain Grisham's men firing rifles from above. One bullet hits the Queen in her side causing her to fall from her horse with her sword. Running from the rifle fire, she makes her way up a hill engaging in swordplay with the soldiers until she reaches the top of the cliff overlooking the sea. Grisham approaches and the Queen feels the pain and blood where she had been shot and realizes her only chance of escape is to chance a hundred feet fall to the water and rocks below. Believing she could not survive the fall, Grisham has his soldiers comb the beach for her body and when the Queen's shirt is found returns to Santa Helena leaving instructions to find the body.

Reporting to Montoya (who is not yet satisfied with only "the skin of the fox" that the Queen is dead), who intends to invite every Spaniard to a party that evening in honor of the doctor that no Spaniard could refuse unless badly hurt. In the square below Vera is telling Marta the Queen is dead, shot and she threw herself from a cliff and was swallowed by the ocean. A shocked Marta makes her way home. Back at the beach a soldier finds the Queen's sword and in the distance the body of the Queen lying prone. As he approaches the body, he is taken by surprise when she awakes and knocks him out only to have a lancer bearing down on her. But she manages to dismount him, taking his horse and collecting her sword. Returning home, the Queen finds a distraught Marta, who is angry with Tessa that she had nearly been killed and she is too weak to go to Montoya's party. But Tessa insists she has to go to allay suspicions. Tessa and Marta attend the party, where all the Dons and their wives are in attendance and Dr. Helm is discussing with Montoya the vehemently-disputes stories about the Queen. Tessa is feeling the pain from her wound and Marta comes over with a shawl as she has spotted blood seeping through the dress. But Tessa has already inadvertently left a bloodied handprint on the wall. The soldier from the beach reports to Montoya the Queen is still alive and Montoya, seeing the blood, realizes the Queen is one of the guests, and orders a lockdown.

Montoya convincingly explains to the assembled partygoers his belief a woman is hurt and the new doctor will examine each one. Helm reluctantly agrees and the amused women readily line up so the doctor can give each one a cursory examination. Tessa joins the queue seeing no way out and as she is about to be examined Marta breaks a glass in her hand and comes forward. Dr. Helm takes Marta to his office much the annoyance of Montoya who insists on a dance with Tessa before she follows Marta. As Dr. Helm treats Marta's wound, she touches his hand and her gypsy persona senses that the doctor was not always a doctor but a soldier in the Napoleonic wars with blood on his hands and secrets to hide.

The next morning, Montoya realizes he needs the doctor to attend to the sick miners and arranges an escort to take him to the secret mine while Tessa is trying to get information from Don Hidalgo as to the location of the mines. But the Don is not forthcoming. Into the square come Louisa and a courtage with a cart carrying the dead body of her husband discovered by soldiers claiming he had fallen. Tessa comforts Louisa and noticing the dirt on his clothes recognizes the location where he had been found. Dr. Helm is at the mine, with Sergeant Mendoza, recommending the men should be removed from the mine, but Mendoza cannot go against Colonel Montoya's orders. A soldier brings a fallen soldier's hat and Mendoza realizes the Queen is nearby as Captain Grisham had predicted. Mendoza takes six hostages and threatens to kill them unless the Queen surrenders - much to Dr. Helms protests - but to Helm's amazement, the Queen surrenders and is tied to a post in front of the mine entrance to the dismay of the miners. Mendoza refuses to unmask the Queen under threat from Captain Grisham that he was to do it so a messenger is dispatched to fetch Colonel Montoya and Captain Grisham. Dr. Helm is shocked at the turn of events and tells Mendoza the Queen is bleeding and will die before Captain Grisham arrives and he should treat the wound. As he treats the wound, Dr. Helm discreetly cuts the ropes holding her wrists.

As the colonel and captain approach the mine, the Queen makes her move and frees herself from the post and retreats into the mine while being chased by Sergeant Mendoza. Inside the mine, the Queen overpowers Mendoza and using him as a shield makes her way back to the entrance where she has cunningly left a trail of gunpowder leading back to a stack of barrels stored in the mine. At the entrance, she fires the gunpowder trail with a torch and dives to the ground and in the ensuing explosion that destroys the mine makes her escape.

The supply ship arrives and everybody is happy with the fresh produce and bolts of cloth, but Colonel Montoya's plans to buy cannon have been thwarted which secretly pleases Grisham. Tessa and Dr. Helm exchange more words over another apple.

== Production notes ==
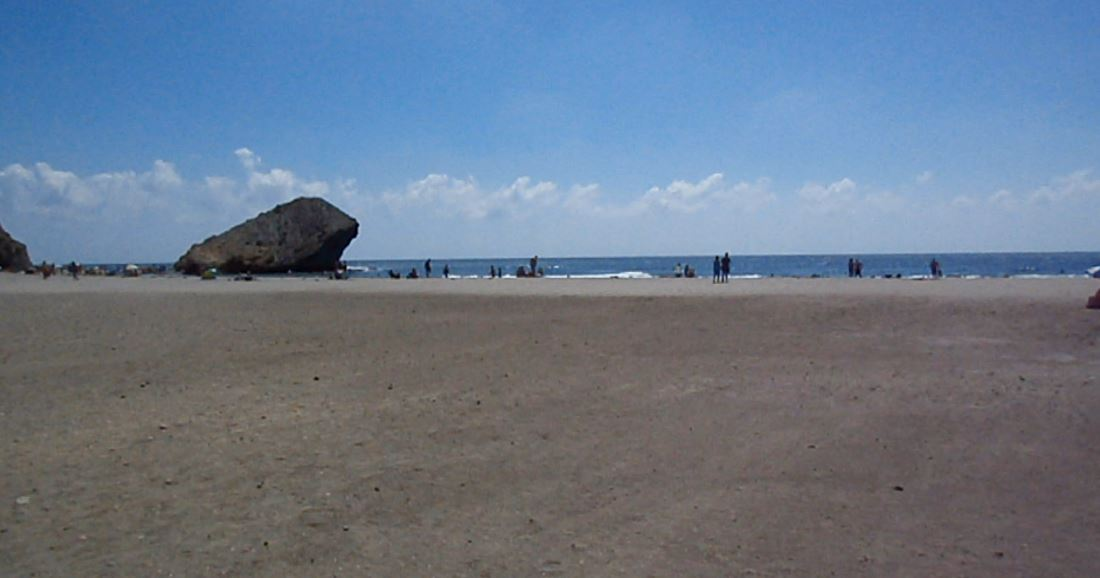
Playa de Mónsul near San José and the rock used for the first scene to be filmed

- This was the first episode to be filmed and the soldiers colorful uniforms were deemed too "opera" and changed for subsequent episodes.
- There was a month off between training and filming in Spain with only a few days of preparation before Tessie Santiago climbed to the top of a cliff to shoot her first scene of the series in "Death to the Queen". This was a two-on-one fight scene in 40 mph winds and with a little adjustment and fine-tuning to location and situation, Tessie Santiago was able to confidently perform all of her own swordplay in this opening sequence.
- The coastal scenes were filmed at Playa de Mónsul near San José.
- The flashback Napoleonic battle scenes were filmed by director Jon Cassar at the same time as Brian Grant directed battle scenes for episode four "Vengeance".
