= Isleta del Moro =

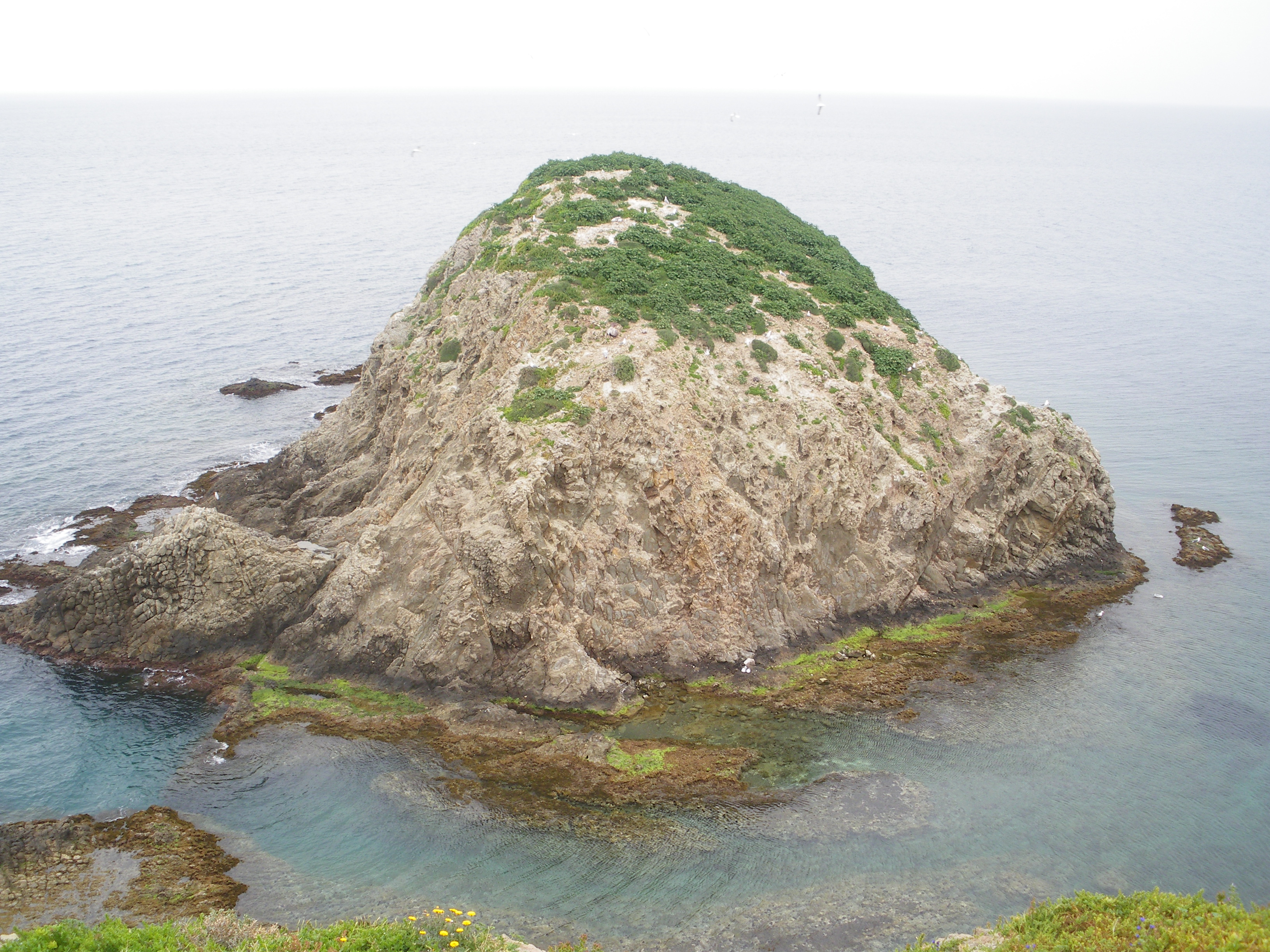
- The island
- Interactive map of Isleta del Moro
- Coordinates: 36°48′50″N 2°03′05″W
- Country: Spain
- Autonomous community: Andalucía
- Province: Almería
- Municipality: Níjar

Population
  - Total: 171 (INE 2,009)

Isleta del Moro is a fishing town located near Los Escullos, in Cabo de Gata. It was frequented by Arabs and Berbers, and it was named after the Berber leader Mohamed Arráez. In May 2018 it was shot Terminator: Dark Fate.
