= Cabo de Gata-Níjar Natural Park =

Nature park in Almería Province, Spain

Cabo de Gata-Níjar
- IUCN category V (protected landscape/seascape)
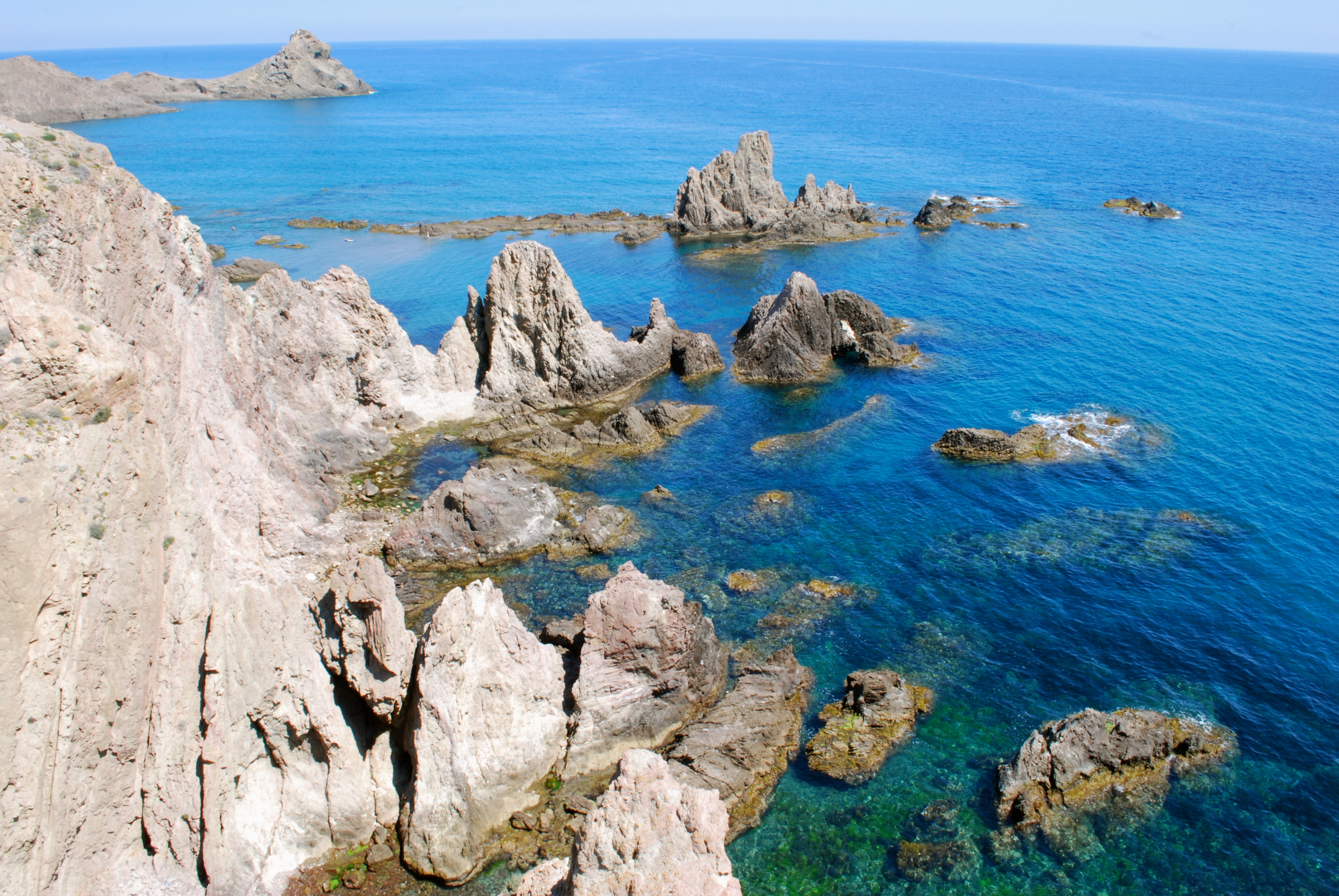
- Arrecife de las Sirenas

- Location within Andalusia Location within Spain
- Location: Almería Province, Andalusia, Spain
- Nearest city: Almería
- Coordinates: 36°47′00″N 02°06′00″W
- Area: 460 km^{2} (180 sq mi)
- Established: 1997
- Visitors: 500,000 (in 1998)
- Governing body: Junta de Andalucia

Ramsar Wetland
- Official name: Salinas del Cabo de Gata
- Designated: 5 December 1989
- Reference no.: 448

The Cabo de Gata-Níjar Natural Park (Spanish: Parque natural del Cabo de Gata-Níjar) is a natural park located in Almería, Spain. It is the largest protected coastal area in Andalusia, featuring a rugged landscape. The park is located on the southeastern coast of Spain, the only region in Europe with a hot desert climate (Köppen climate classification: BWh).

The eponymous mountain range of the Sierra del Cabo de Gata forms a volcanic rock formation with sharp peaks and crags. The highest peak on this mountain range is El Fraile (Sierra del Cabo de Gata). It falls steeply to the Mediterranean Sea, creating jagged 100-metre (330 ft) high cliffs divided by gullies, creating numerous small coves and white-sand beaches.

There are numerous small rocky islands and coral reefs in the area. In 1997, it was designated as a UNESCO Biosphere Reserve. In 2001, it was included among the Specially Protected Areas of Mediterranean Importance. Due to the adsorptive properties and low permeability of its clays, the area was studied as a possible place for deep storage of sealed radioactive waste.

== Geography ==
Cabo de Gata-Níjar Natural Park is characterized by volcanic rock formations as well as lava flows, volcanic domes, and volcanic calderas. The park joined UNESCO's Global Geoparks Network in 2006, and it is also a member of the European Geoparks Network.

Between the village of San Miguel and the Cabo de Gata point are salt flats (Las Salinas de Cabo de Gata) separated from the sea by a 400 m (1,300 ft) sand bar. The salt flats are a Ramsar site.

The coast of the natural park has seagrass beds of the genus Posidonia and offshore coral reefs which host resident and transient marine species. A 120 km^{2} (46 sq mi) part of the total designated protected area is a marine reserve, extending underwater to a depth of 60 m (200 ft).

The characteristic vegetation in the terrestrial zone is a drought-adapted flora: large agave, prickly pear, dwarf fan palms, and many xerophytes (some of which are endemic).

== Climate ==
Cabo de Gata experiences a hot desert climate (Köppen climate classification: BWh) with warm temperatures year-round due to maritime influence. Winters are extremely mild by European standards and are some of the warmest in Europe. The annual average temperature is approximately 19.8 °C (67.6 °F), and the average annual rainfall is around 156 mm (6.1 in), recorded at the Faro del Cabo de Gata (36°43'18.8"N, 2°11'34.69"W) during the period 1961–1990. It is the driest region in Europe as well as the driest in Spain, excluding the Canary Islands. In recent years, the annual average precipitation has been less than 150 millimetres (5.9 in). During the summer, tropical nights are very common and, on average, Cabo de Gata has 119 tropical nights per year. Cabo de Gata has dropped as low as 0.0 °C (32.0 °F) in February 1979 while it has reached 43.0 °C (109.4 °F) in July 1975. These temperatures were recorded at the Michelin Experience Center in Almería, which is located in the interior of Cabo de Gata, about 10 km (6.2 mi) from Faro del Cabo de Gata.

Climate data for Cabo de Gata (2010-2025), extremes (2010-present)
Month	Jan	Feb	Mar	Apr	May	Jun	Jul	Aug	Sep	Oct	Nov	Dec	Year
Record high °C (°F)	22.2 (72.0)	23.1 (73.6)	25.9 (78.6)	29.9 (85.8)	31.5 (88.7)	35.4 (95.7)	37.6 (99.7)	37.5 (99.5)	35.8 (96.4)	30.2 (86.4)	27.2 (81.0)	24.7 (76.5)	37.6 (99.7)
Mean daily maximum °C (°F)	16.8 (62.2)	17.0 (62.6)	18.0 (64.4)	19.9 (67.8)	22.9 (73.2)	26.1 (79.0)	28.8 (83.8)	29.6 (85.3)	27.2 (81.0)	24.1 (75.4)	20.2 (68.4)	17.9 (64.2)	22.4 (72.3)
Daily mean °C (°F)	14.4 (57.9)	14.6 (58.3)	15.6 (60.1)	17.5 (63.5)	20.3 (68.5)	23.4 (74.1)	26.2 (79.2)	27.1 (80.8)	24.8 (76.6)	21.7 (71.1)	17.8 (64.0)	15.6 (60.1)	19.9 (67.9)
Mean daily minimum °C (°F)	12.1 (53.8)	12.2 (54.0)	13.2 (55.8)	15.1 (59.2)	17.6 (63.7)	20.7 (69.3)	23.5 (74.3)	24.6 (76.3)	22.4 (72.3)	19.3 (66.7)	15.4 (59.7)	13.2 (55.8)	17.4 (63.4)
Record low °C (°F)	4.8 (40.6)	3.4 (38.1)	5.0 (41.0)	9.7 (49.5)	12.0 (53.6)	15.7 (60.3)	17.9 (64.2)	18.2 (64.8)	16.2 (61.2)	11.8 (53.2)	9.4 (48.9)	7.5 (45.5)	3.4 (38.1)
Average precipitation mm (inches)	16.1 (0.63)	10.2 (0.40)	29.8 (1.17)	9.6 (0.38)	10.1 (0.40)	1.3 (0.05)	0.1 (0.00)	5.2 (0.20)	11.9 (0.47)	15.2 (0.60)	13.3 (0.52)	20.9 (0.82)	143.7 (5.64)
Average precipitation days (≥ 1 mm)	2.2	2.3	3.8	2.2	1.2	0.2	0.0	0.7	1.5	2.8	2.6	2.6	22.1
Average relative humidity (%)	70	68	69	70	66	66	69	70	71	72	70	70	69
Source: Agencia Estatal de Meteorología (AEMET OpenData)

== Human impact on the park ==
Historically, the area has been sparsely populated due to the difficult agricultural circumstances and its remote location, which has kept it largely unspoiled—an uncommon occurrence on the Mediterranean coast of Spain. In 1997, 3,500 people were recorded as living within the boundaries. The natural park protection has now received promises to keep the residential expansion under control. Dotted around the natural park are abandoned areas like the farms, houses, factories, and sometimes, whole villages dating back to various periods in time. The exact reasons for the abandonment are not clear, but it is thought that the harsh conditions for agriculture together with questionable permissions to build and the prevailing economic climate at the time might be major factors. This is something that continues to this day with perhaps the most infamous example being the Algarrobico.

In 2003, a hotel project was started at Playa del Algarrobico between Carboneras and Mojacar, just inside the park. Work on the project was halted. Several sources claim that this project is an illegal development, although it seems that more recently demolition plans, opposed by 14 municipalities, are moving closer. In 2021, the highest regional court of Andalusia ruled that the hotel did not have to be destroyed because the real estate developer had a valid building license.

Many of the abandoned neighborhoods and buildings still stand because they are deemed to be significant historical landmarks. Examples of this are the deserted mining villages around Rodalquilar. Another example is Cortijo del Fraile. There have been moves to restore it, but as yet, nothing has happened except a few efforts to raise money.

== Tourism ==
Tourism is one of the biggest industries in the Parque Natural de Cabo de Gata, with visitors coming mainly during the spring and summer months. In 1998, 500,000 tourists visited the area.

Eco-tourism has become more and more popular in recent years. The park offers diving and boat tours, as well as environmentally responsible outdoor activities including bird watching, photography, and field trips for geology. There are a number of arts and crafts based on local traditions that are still carried out around the Parque Natural de Cabo de Gata and especially in the little Moorish "pueblo blanco" of Níjar. The traditional arts and crafts include ceramics, pottery, carpet making and woven goods (baskets, hats, shoes, etc.) made from esparto grass.

While the hiking network is not extensive, there are a number of senderos that provide for day hikes. The Caldera de Majada Redonda is one such trail that leads to the center of an ancient volcano caldera.

== Towns ==
There are some small towns in the Cabo de Gata area.

=== Agua Amarga ===
Translated from the Spanish, Agua Amarga literally means "bitter water". This name dates back to when trains used to bring minerals from the mines in the Sierra Alhamilla and chemicals used in the mining process would taint the wells in the town.

=== Cabo de Gata ===
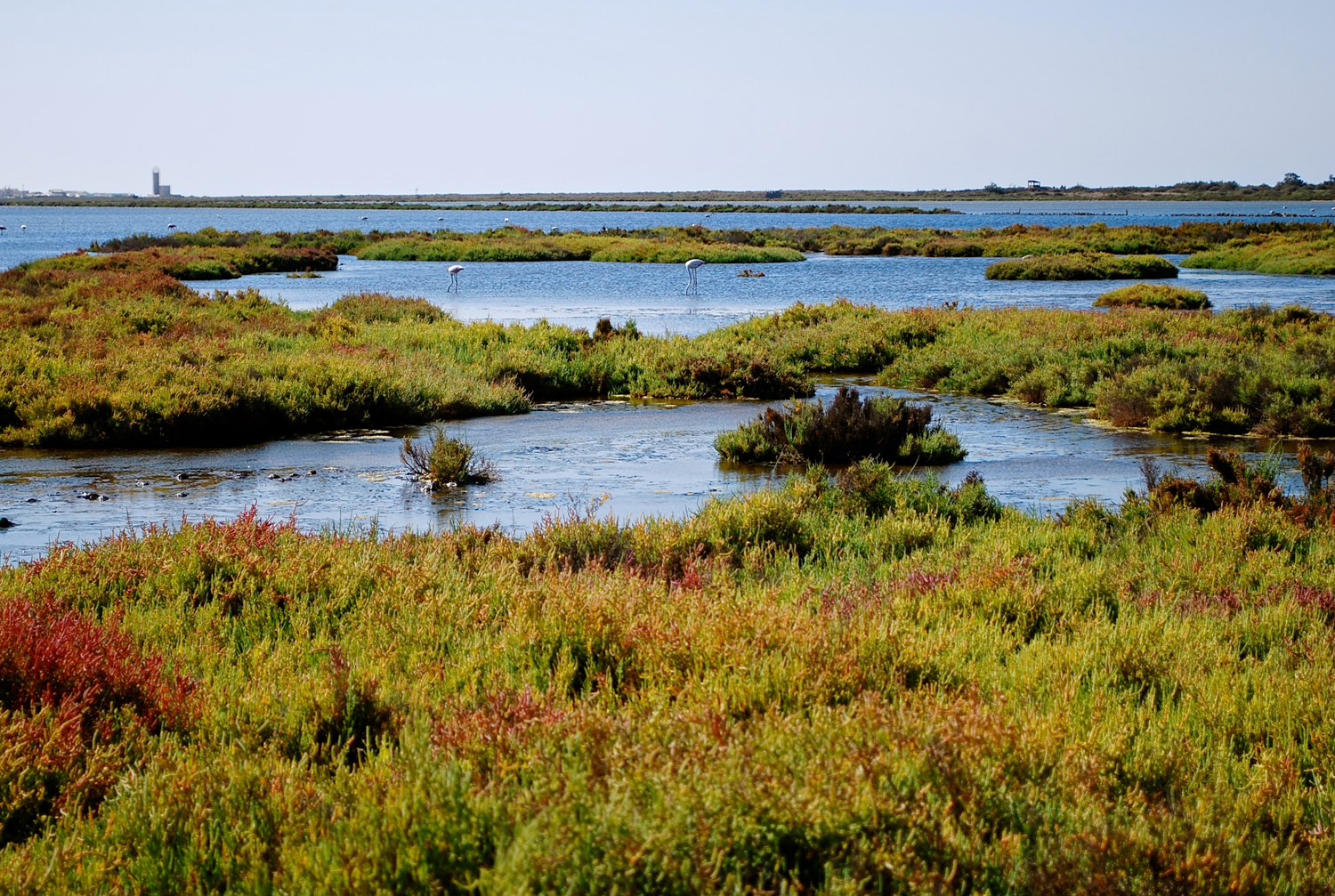
Las Salinas de Cabo de Gata

The strip of beach known as Playa de San Miguel and the adjacent road stretches from the small village of Cabo de Gata to La Fabriquilla before ascending a tiny mountain pass toward the Arrecife de las Sirenas and the beaches beyond. This coastal strip is generally known as Cabo de Gata although it comprises several little smaller villages (pueblitos) including Cabo de Gata, Almadraba de Monteleva, and La Fabriquila. At Almadraba de Monteleva are the salt works that are still operational, next to the salt works are the ram-shackled and salt-blasted houses of former workers, some of which are still occupied. Opposite these houses is the church of San Miguel. Behind the salt works are the lagoons known as Las Salinas de Cabo de Gata. Cabo de Gata has a tradition of fishing, which continues to this day, and there are several old fishing boats that have been left along the Playa de San Miguel as artifacts of days gone by. These are said to have an important ethnological value and are left as a "living museum".

=== Carboneras ===
The pueblo of Carboneras is located near the easternmost border of Parque Natural de Cabo de Gata.

Located just a little out-of-town and en route to Agua Amarga, is the naturist beach of Playa de los Muertos (the Beach of the Dead). Carboneras is also known as a town of live music due to the Teatro de Musica and several other smaller venues hosting live music all year round. At its western edge it has an industrial area that combines a power station, a large cement plant, one of Europe's largest desalination (reverse-osmosis) plants, and a port, all of which pre-date the national park. The power station has been used for carbon capture research.

=== Las Negras ===
Las Negras is a seaside village towards the eastern end of the natural park and just to the west of Agua Amarga.

=== Los Albaricoques ===
Los Albaricoques is the pueblo of Agua Caliente in the seminal films of Sergio Leone. The final shootout in the spaghetti Western film For a Few Dollars More took place in the centre of Los Albaricoques. There is only one shop and two bars in Los Albaricoques. Not far from the pueblo of Los Albaricoques is the infamous Cortijo del Fraile, the backdrop for Federico Garcia Lorca's seminal play, Bodas de Sangre (Blood Wedding), which features a crime of passion that took place close by.

=== Níjar ===
Níjar is located inland and on the northern edge of the natural park. Níjar hosts processions on Semana Santa (Holy Week). In the bigger towns and cities around Spain, these processions are quite lavish including at times some very intricate animatronics but in smaller towns, such as in Níjar, they are much more "earthy" affairs.

=== Rodalquilar ===
The pueblo of Rodalquilar sits in the middle of the Parque Natural de Cabo de Gata. There are several art galleries featuring painting, photography, pottery, and ceramics. Rodalaquilar is known in the province of Almería for ancient gold mines. One of the more popular beaches near Rodalquilar is Playa el Playazo. This beach is 400 meters long and 30 meters wide, and its sand is golden and fine. In common with many of the beaches in the middle and toward the western end of the natural park, the sea offers good visibility for snorkeling or diving.. El Playazo is encircled by a mountain and Saint Ramon's Castle. This Castle was built in the 18th century so that the coast of Almería could defend itself from sea attacks.

Rodalquilar was the townsite for the Rodalquilar Gold Mine, which operated intermittently from Roman times to the mid-1960s. The new mineral Rodalquilarite was discovered there. The abandoned mine workings were used for a post-apocalyptic film set

=== San José ===
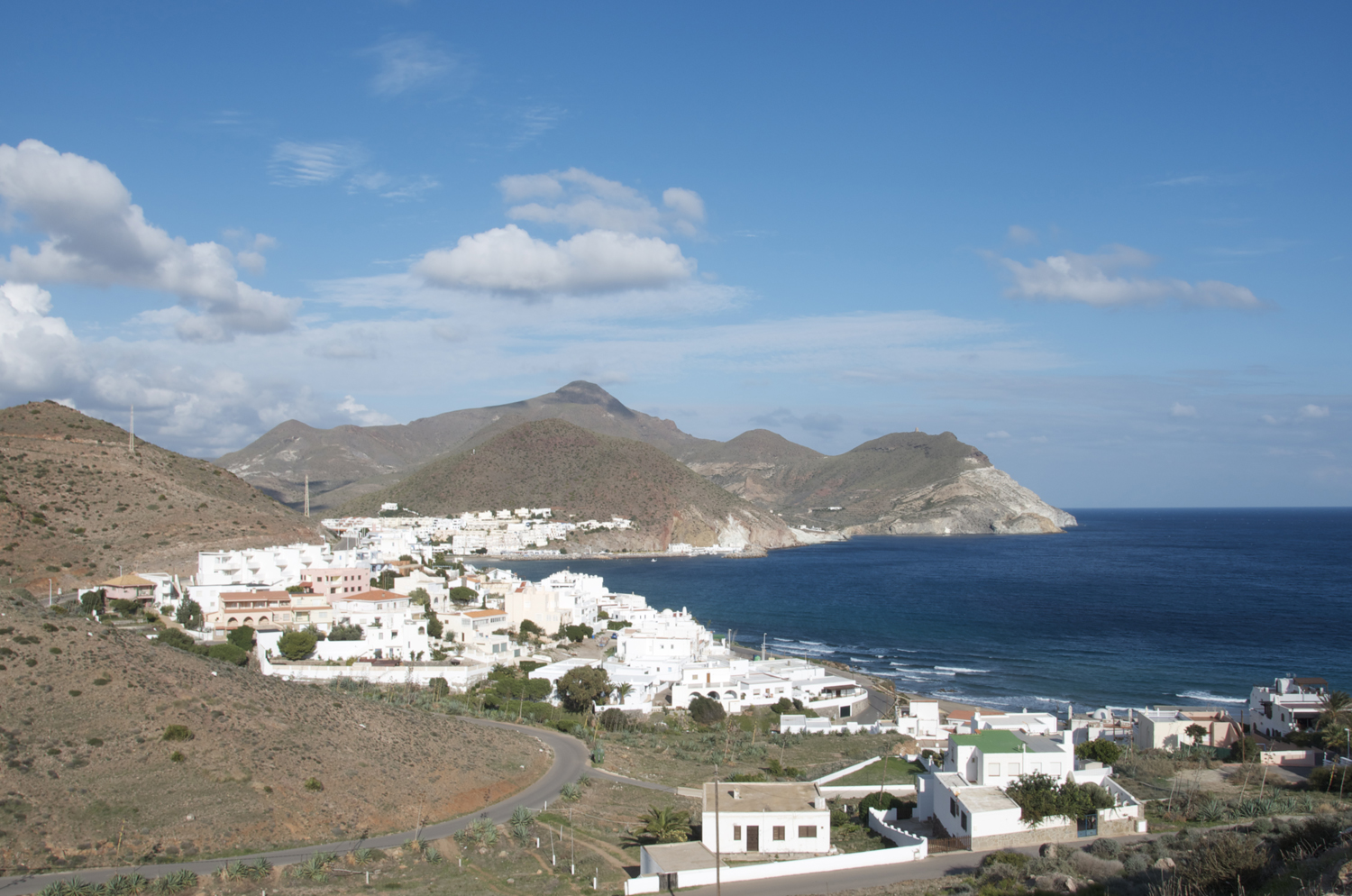
The pueblo of San José

San José is a small fishing port in the centre of the natural park and is accessible from Almería Airport and the Autovia A-7. It is most popular during the spring and summer months, because of the activities that the beaches of San José can offer such as snorkel or swimming. The local tourist office offers a reference point for activities in the Parque Natural de Cabo de Gata.

=== Various other ===
There are several smaller towns and villages in the Parque Natural de Cabo de Gata, for example, Campohermoso, Fernán Pérez, Isleta del Moro, Los Escullos, Pozo de los Frailes, and San Isidro.

== Flora ==
There are more than 1,000 plants recorded in the reserve, some of which are endemic to the Parque Natural de Cabo de Gata and have become symbols of the natural park. The Natural Park of Cabo de Gata presents special weather conditions, which permit the plants to take advantage of the rain. These plants are very diverse, surviving the weather and adapting to the characteristics of the ground.

=== European fan palm ===
The European fan palm (Chamaerops humilis) is a shrub-like clumping palm, with several stems growing from a single base. It is the only palm species native to continental Europe and is mainly found in southwestern Europe (Spain, Portugal, Italy, Malta, and certain locations on the Mediterranean coast of France) and northwestern Africa (Morocco, Algeria, Tunisia). Europe's only native palm supplements the meagre groundwater supplies with dew and airborne moisture.

=== Agave americana (Pita) ===
One of the most familiar plant species in the natural park is Agave americana, or pita, a native of tropical America and Mexico. Common names include century plant, maguey (in Mexico), or American aloe (it is not, however, closely related to the genus Aloe). The name "century plant" refers to the long time the plant takes to flower. The number of years before flowering occurs depends on the vigor of the individual plant, the richness of the soil, and the climate; during these years the plant is storing in its fleshy leaves the nutrients required for the effort of flowering.

=== Dragoncillo del Cabo ===
Some of the plants endemic to the Parque Natural de Cabo de Gata include the pink snapdragon (Antirrhinum charidemi), known to the locals as the Dragoncillo del Cabo. This endemic plant is called the Dragoncillo del Cabo because its flowers are pink with dark veins. It grows in rock cracks, rocky slopes, and volcanic slopes near the sea.

=== Other plants ===
Iberia's largest population of jujube (Ziziphus zizyphus), a thorny shrub, populates the steppe and is known locally as Azofeifa. The scrubland is composed of olive trees (Olea europaea), mastic (Pistacia lentiscus), Kermes oaks (Quercus coccifera), esparto grass (Stipa tenacissima), thyme (Thymus), and rosemary (Rosmarinus officinalis).

Around the salt flats are colonies of saltwort, common reeds (Phragmites australis), and glasswort (Salicornia fruticosa). In the coastal waters are extensive beds of seagrass (Posidonia oceanica), which is endemic to the Mediterranean, and 260 species of seaweed.

== Fauna ==
1,100 species of fauna have been recorded within the park, the majority of which are birds. The European Union has designated a Special Protection Area for bird life. The salt flats provide an important habitat for both the resident birds and the thousands of migrating birds who stop on their journey between Europe and Africa. Species found around the salt flats include flamingos (Phoenicopterus roseus); grey (Ardea cinerea); purple herons (Ardea purpurea); storks; cranes; waders including avocets and oystercatchers; and overwintering ducks.

Many species of lark live on the steppe, including the rare Dupont's lark (Chersophilus duponti). Also present are little bustards (Tetrax tetrax) and stone curlews (Burhinus oedicnemus). Sea birds include yellow-legged gulls (Larus michahellis), terns, razorbills (Alca torda), shags, the occasional puffin (Fratercula arctica) or Cory's shearwater (Calonectris diomedea), and Balearic shearwaters (Puffinus mauretanicus). The wealth of animal life provides prey for several raptors: ospreys (Pandion haliaetus), peregrine falcons (Falco peregrinus), kestrels (Falco tinnunculus), and eagles.

Approximately 15 species of reptile are found in the park, including Italian wall lizards (Podarcis sicula), ocellated lizards (Timon lepidus), grass snakes (Natrix natrix), and Lataste's viper (Vipera latastei).

The maritime reserve is home to various species of crustaceans, molluscs, and fishes including the common cuttlefish (Sepia officinalis), the Pinna nobilis clam (which produces sea silk), the Mediterranean moray (Muraena helena), which was regarded as a delicacy by the Romans, the garfish (Belone belone), and the flying gurnard (Dactylopterus volitans), which uses its enlarged pectoral fins to "walk" along the ocean floor. Seaweeds host fish such as bream and grouper.

Among the mammals in the park are common genets (Genetta genetta), wild boar (Sus scrofa), the garden dormouse (Eliomys quercinus), and the least weasel (Mustela nivalis), which is the smallest terrestrial mammalian carnivore. The seagrass used to provide a habitat for the endangered monk seal (Monachus monachus). Up until the 1960s it was one of the last locations where this seal bred in Spain, the islet of Tabarca being the other one. Although occasionally sighted offshore, no seals have bred in the park since 1965.

== Media ==
Notable films have been filmed in the natural park, at the Playa de Mónsul, such as Antony and Cleopatra (1972), The NeverEnding Story (1984), The Adventures of Baron Munchausen (1988), Indiana Jones and the Last Crusade (1989), and Talk to Her (2002).

Much of the 2000 film Sexy Beast was shot at a villa in Agua Amarga.

The British band Jamiroquai filmed the video for their 1996 single "Cosmic Girl" in the natural park.

== See also ==
- European Geoparks Network
- Global Geoparks Network
