= San José (Almería) =

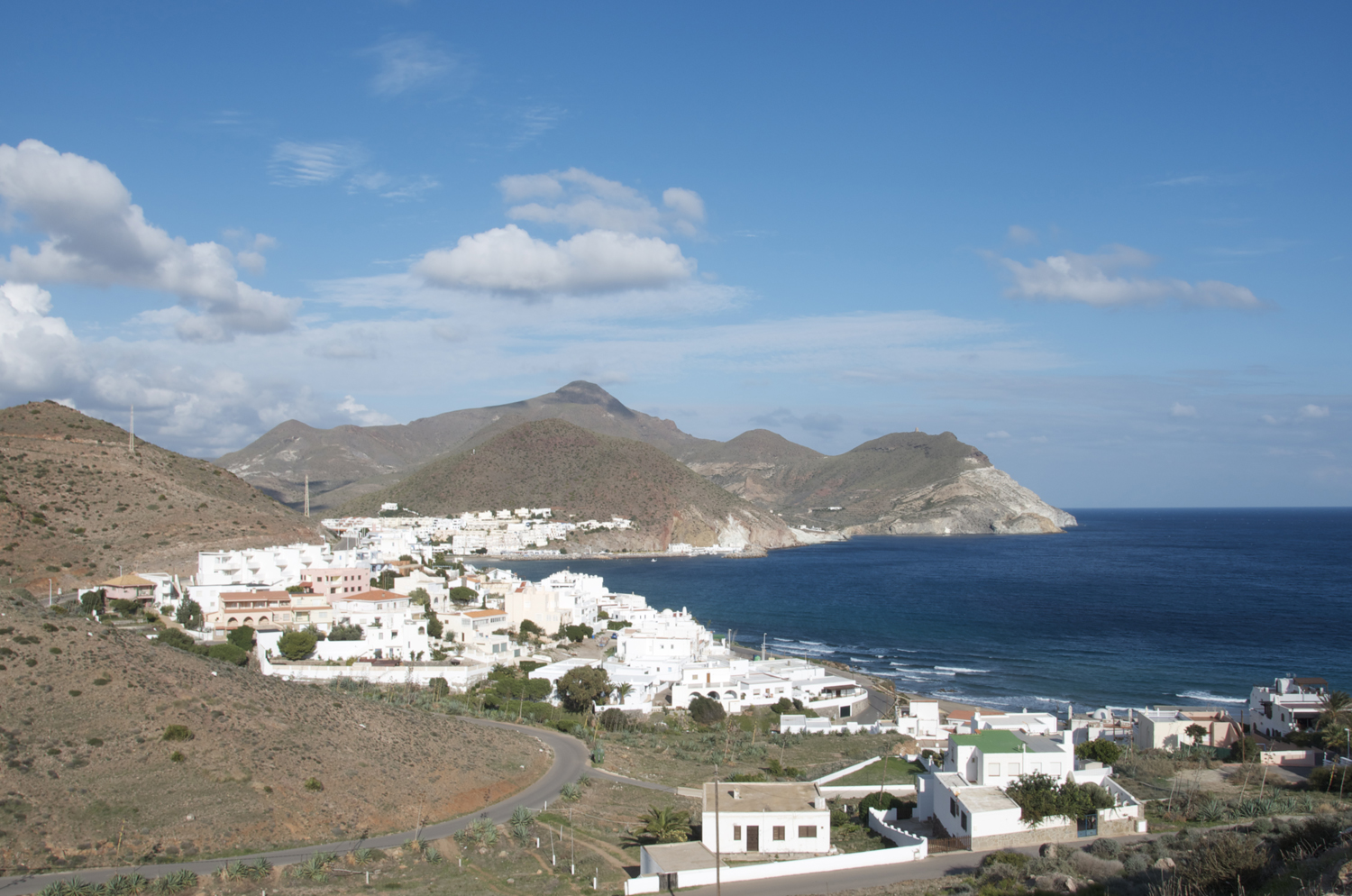
- San José from Campillo de los Genoveses.

- Location within Spain
- Coordinates: 36°45′28″N 2°6′34″W
- Country: Spain
- Region: Andalusia
- Province: Almería
- Comarca: Nijar
- Elevation: 23 m (75 ft)

Population (2019)
  - Total: 849
- Time zone: UTC+1 (CET)
  - Summer (DST): UTC+2 (CEST)

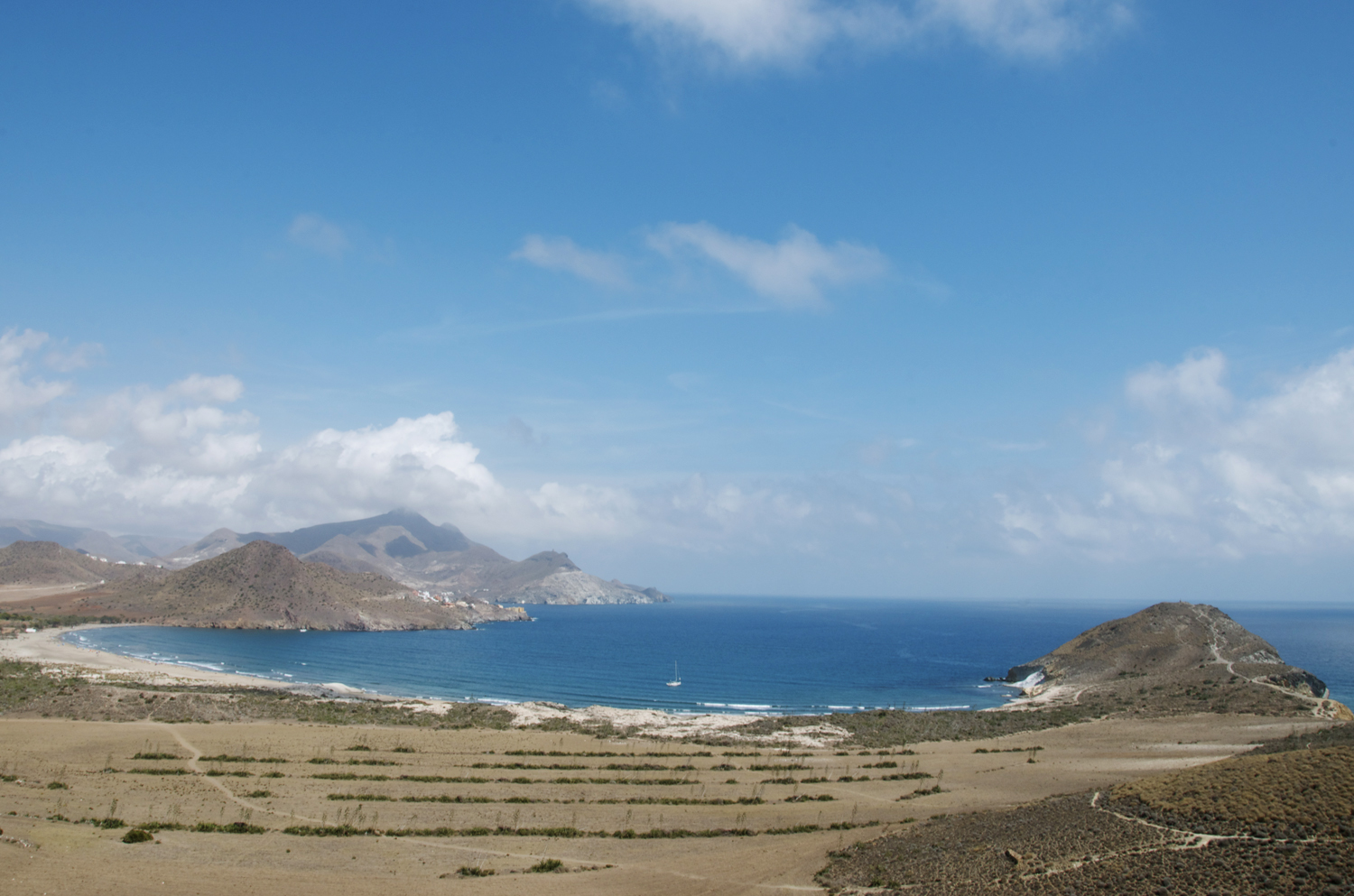
Playa de los Genoveses

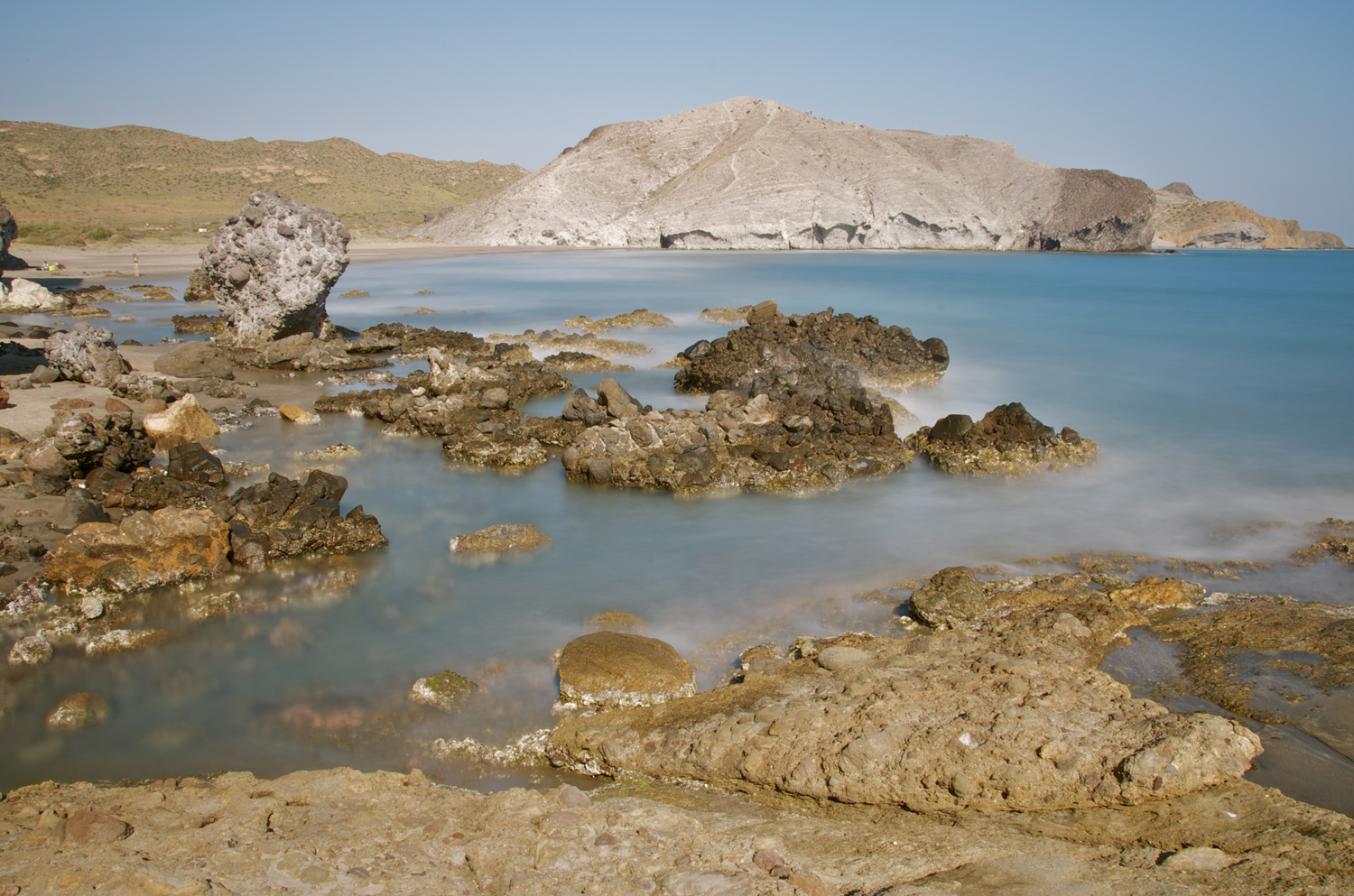
Cala de la Media Luna

San José is a village and fishing port in the centre of Cabo de Gata-Níjar Natural Park, in the Province of Almería, Spain. Its population in 2011 was 1012 inhabitants, recorded by the INE.

In recent years San José has experienced an increase in the number of visitors and is an easily accessible town from Almería Airport and the Autovía A-7. San José, as with all of the Parque Natural de Cabo de Gata, is most popular during the spring and summer months. San José boasts a few beaches, a few outside the town and within walking distance, such as Playa de los Genoveses, Playa de Mónsul and Cala de la Media Luna. There are several restaurants and tapas bars in San José. The local independently run tourist office is a reference point for activities in the Parque Natural de Cabo de Gata. Accommodation is plentiful although in summer some places can be fairly expensive and are quickly filled.

== Nature and tourism ==
=== Natural spaces ===
The area surrounding San José forms part of the Cabo de Gata-Níjar Natural Park and includes beaches and other natural areas accessible on foot from the village.

==== Beaches ====
Apart from the town beaches of Playa de San José, Playa de la Calilla and "Tobacco Beach", one can wander westward to the beaches of Playa de los Genoveses, Playa de Mónsul and Cala de la Media Luna. These are just a few of the beaches and coves to be found to the west of the town. There is also Playa del Barronal, Cala del Príncipe, Cala Chica, Cala Carbón and many more. To the east to the pueblo is Cala Higuera, overlooked by the bar El Refugio (only open mid- to high season). All beaches around San José are ideal for snorkelling.

==== Campillo de los Genoveses ====
Alongside the beach Playa de los Genoveses is the Campillo de los Genoveses, a partly cultivated natural space that is a haven for flora and fauna. Further along the track is part of the Sierra de Cabo de Gata. Both of these areas are popular with wildlife enthusiasts, hikers, artists and photographers, cyclists and shepherds grazing their goats and sheep. Amongst the features of Campillo de los Genoveses is a huge fossilised sand dune that once was part of the beach, making this an area of geological importance.

=== Notable fiestas ===
San José celebrates along with the rest of the country (where appropriate). The following fiestas are the largest to be celebrated in San José annually.

==== Carnival (Carnaval) ====
The week leading up to Lent is a time for wild partying in some parts of Spain when the country plays host to Europe’s biggest Carnival festivals. San José, like most other towns, hosts its own carnival.

==== Día de San José ====
Día de San José or Saint Joseph’s Day honors St Joseph, the Virgin Mary’s spouse, and is held annually all over Spain on 19 March. This date is also known as Father’s Day (Día del Padre) in many areas of the country. The celebrations start on Friday night where live music is played in the main square or plaza and there is a drinks tent selling beer, wine and tapas. This is in addition to the already crowded bars.

==== Fiesta de San Juan ====
Fiesta de San Juan is a festival of ancient origin adapted to commemorate St. John the Baptist. It is a festival that is usually linked with celebrations to celebrate the arrival of the summer solstice in the northern hemisphere, whose principal rite is a fire. The purpose of this ritual was to "give more power to the sun". The festival is marked by a night of partying around beach bonfires and party-goers jumping over waves, each wave supposedly bringing good luck.

=== The paseo ===
During the spring and summer months, the paseo in San José features a number of artisan market stalls selling all manner of hand-made jewellery, leather goods, clothing, incense holders and other unusual and original goods.

=== Things to do ===
During the spring and summer months, there is plenty to do in San José; diving, kayaking, photography experiences, wildlife watching, geological field trips, and hiking are just some of the activities to do in and around San José. Some of these activities are also available throughout the year.

== Cinema ==
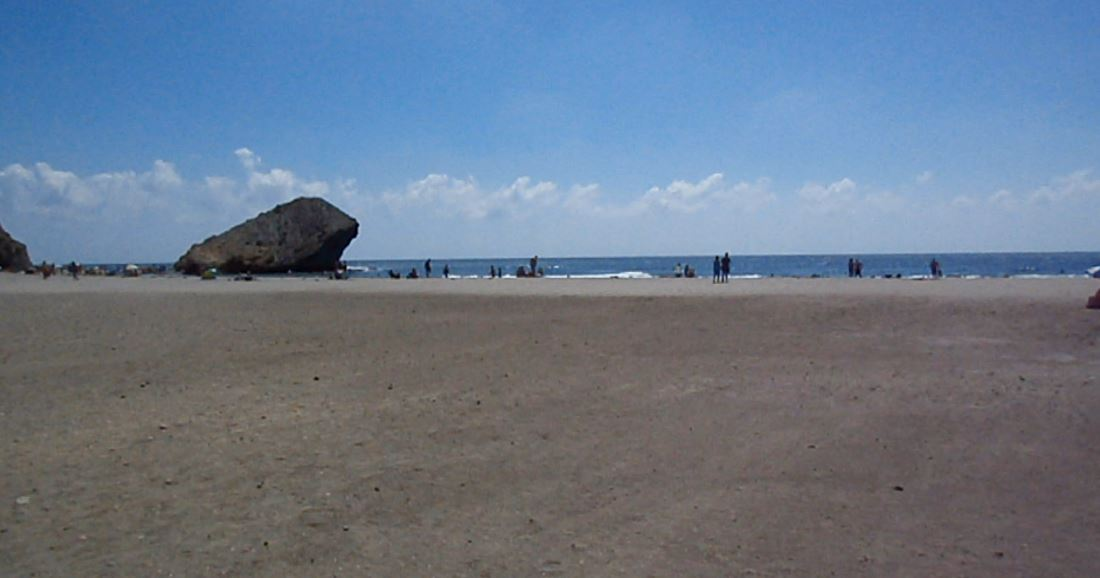
Playa de Mónsul

In common with a number of locations around the province of Almería, San José has been used a number of times in cinematic/TV history. A Fistful of Dollars, For a Few Dollars More, The Good, the Bad and the Ugly, and Lawrence of Arabia are amongst the many epics that feature scenes around San José.

The nearby Monsul beach has been used for scenes in Indiana Jones and the Last Crusade and the music clip 'Ave Maria' from pop star David Bisbal. The syndicated TV series Queen of Swords used Monsul Beach and nearby locations for haciendas throughout the series. The top of the rock was used as a fight location in the first filmed episode "Death to the Queen" when actress Tessie Santiago climbed to the top for a two-on-one sword fight.
