= Los Escullos =

Coordinates: 36.8036°N 2.0639°W

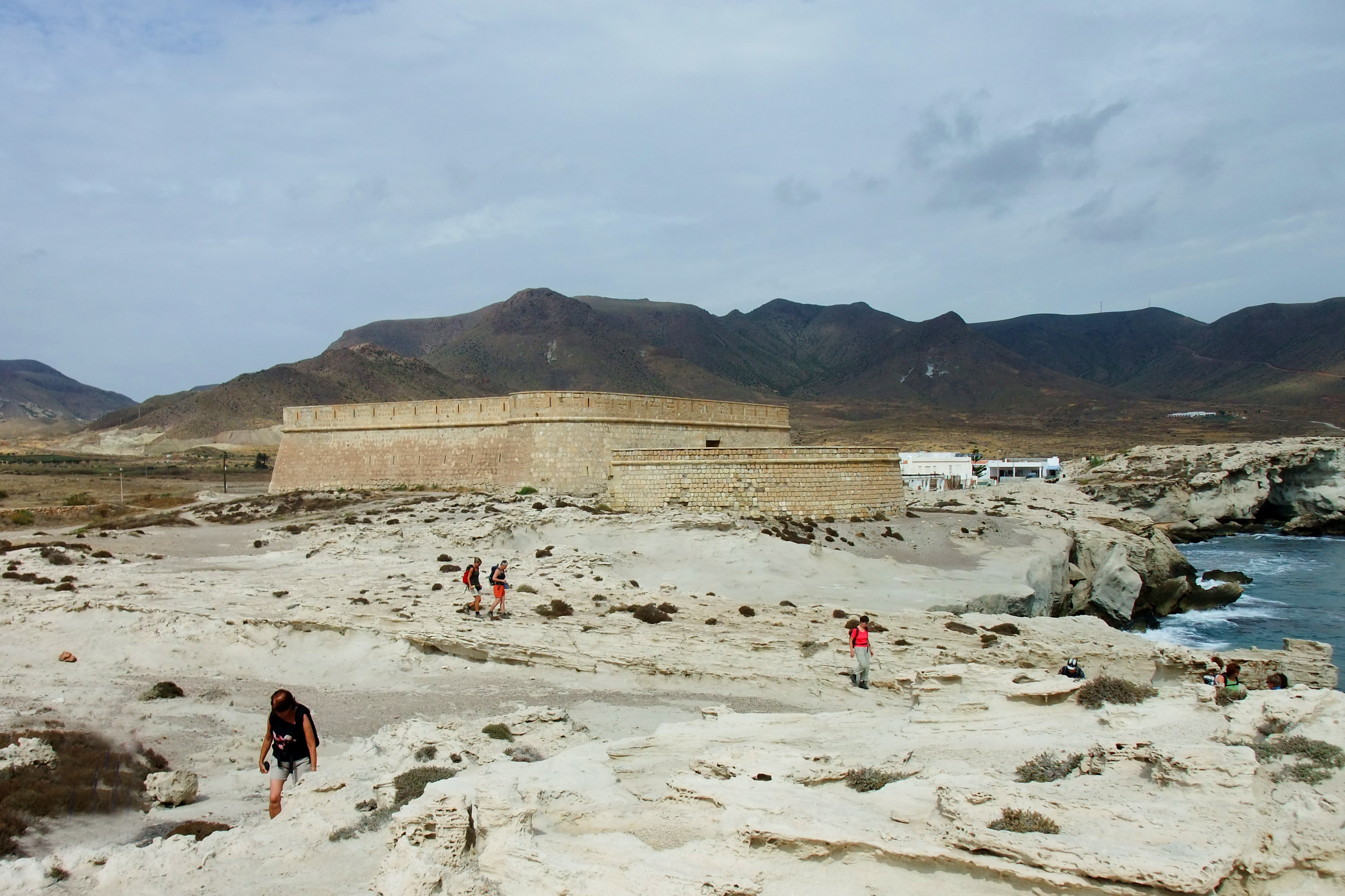

Los Escullos is a village in the municipality of Níjar, province of Almería, Spain. It is located inside Cabo de Gata Natural Park, Níjar. In the surroundings of the town we have located some sights such as "La playa del Arco" or "La cala del Embarcadero". In the year 2008 the town had 62 inhabitants.

== Castle of Saint Felipe ==
During the kingdom of Carlos III of Spain for the defense of the littoral, this fortress was built during the year 1764 with common halls, chapel and headquarters surrounding a courtyard. It cost 201.000 real of vellón. This castle was disarmed by the French army during the Spanish Independence War. Halfway into the 19th century it was occupied by the special forces in charge of the surveillance of the seacoast. During the 20th century it was abandoned and repaired between 1990-1991.

== Cinema ==
In this place were filmed scenes of the films: Les Dalton, Never Say Never Again and The Coyote.

== See also ==
- Níjar
- Natural park of the Cape of Cat-Níjar
