= Playa de Mónsul =

Beach in Almería province, Spain

Playa de Mónsul Ensenada de Mónsul
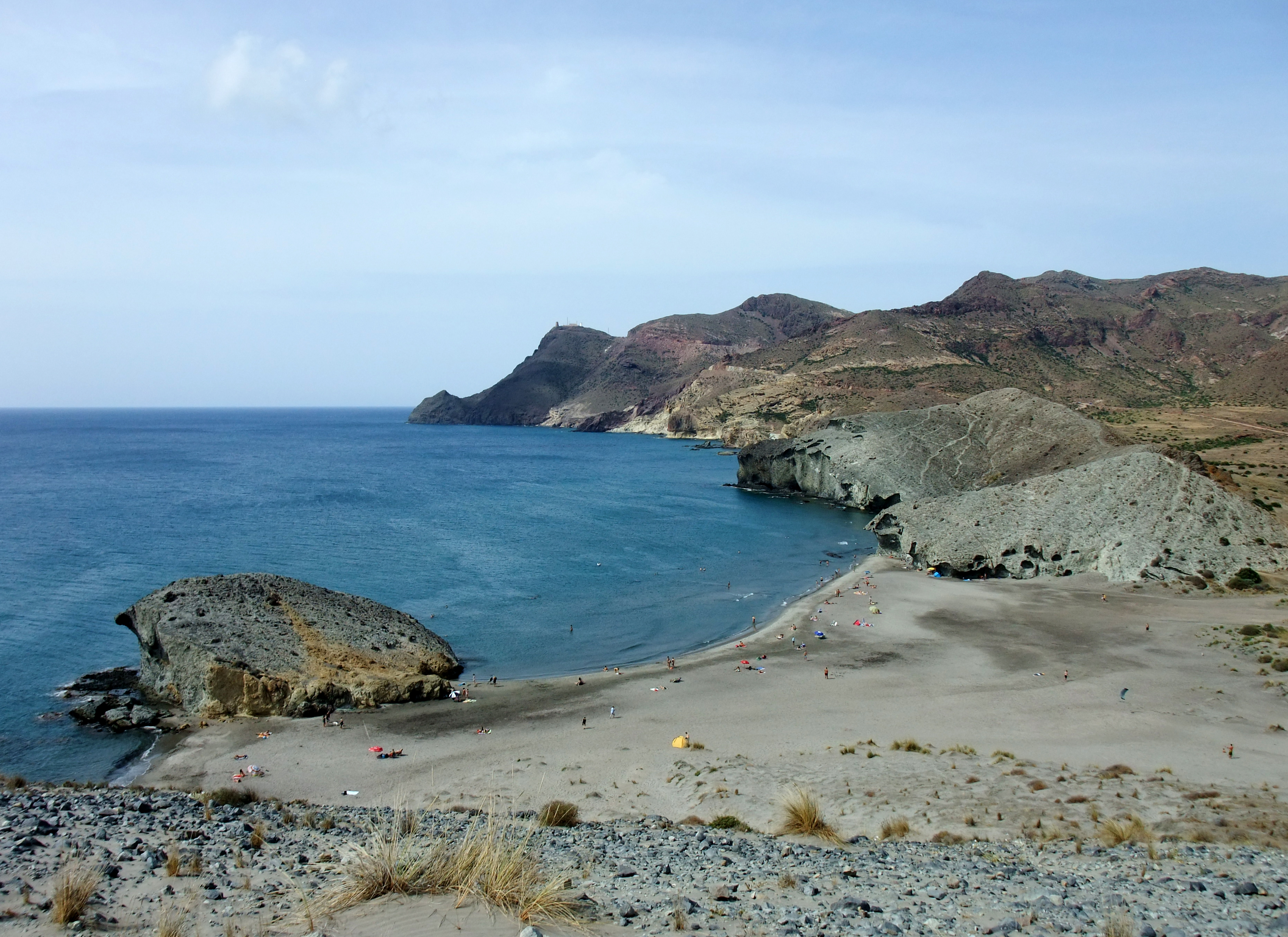
- Playa de Mónsul

- Location within Andalusia
- Location: Province of Almería, Andalusia, Spain
- Coordinates: 36.731229°N 2.152394°W
- Max. length: 300 metres (980 ft)
- Max. width: 45 metres (148 ft)
- Settlements: San José

The Playa de Mónsul (English: Mónsul Beach), also known as the Ensenada de Mónsul (English: Mónsul Cove), is a beach located 4 km southwest of the municipality of San José on the coast of the Province of Almería in southeast Andalusia, Spain. It is one of the most famous and recognizable beaches in Spain, and is a popular recreation area.

== Description ==
The Playa de Mónsul is 300 m long and 45 m wide with a distinctive rock in the middle of the beach. It is located in the Cabo de Gata-Níjar Natural Park, which is the last almost unspoilt area on the Andalusian Mediterranean coast. The beach is surrounded by the Sierra del Cabo de Gata (Cabo de Gata Mountains), which is mostly located in the natural park. The 493 m high Pico de los Frailes, which is the highest peak of the Sierra del Cabo de Gata, is visible from the beach. The beach consists mainly of dark volcanic rock and sand, like the rest of the mountain range which is of volcanic origin, that covers most of the natural park. Due to the desert climate, the area only has sparse vegetation.

Due to its relative remoteness and difficult topography, the area was spared from tourist development. An environmental movement was active at an early stage, which in 1984 successfully prevented a development project on the Playa de Mónsul. With the creation of the Cabo de Gata-Níjar Natural Park on December 5, 1989, the entire area became protected and all development forbidden.

== Film location ==
A scene from Indiana Jones and the Last Crusade (1989) was filmed on this beach, in which Henry Jones Sr. (played by Sean Connery) caused a Luftwaffe fighter plane to crash by scaring a flock of seagulls with an umbrella.

Other films that were shot on the beach are Antony and Cleopatra (1972), The NeverEnding Story (1984), The Adventures of Baron Munchausen (1988) and Talk to Her (2002).

== See also ==
- Costa de Almería
