= Los Albaricoques =

Coordinates: 36°51′0.83″N 2°7′22.31″W

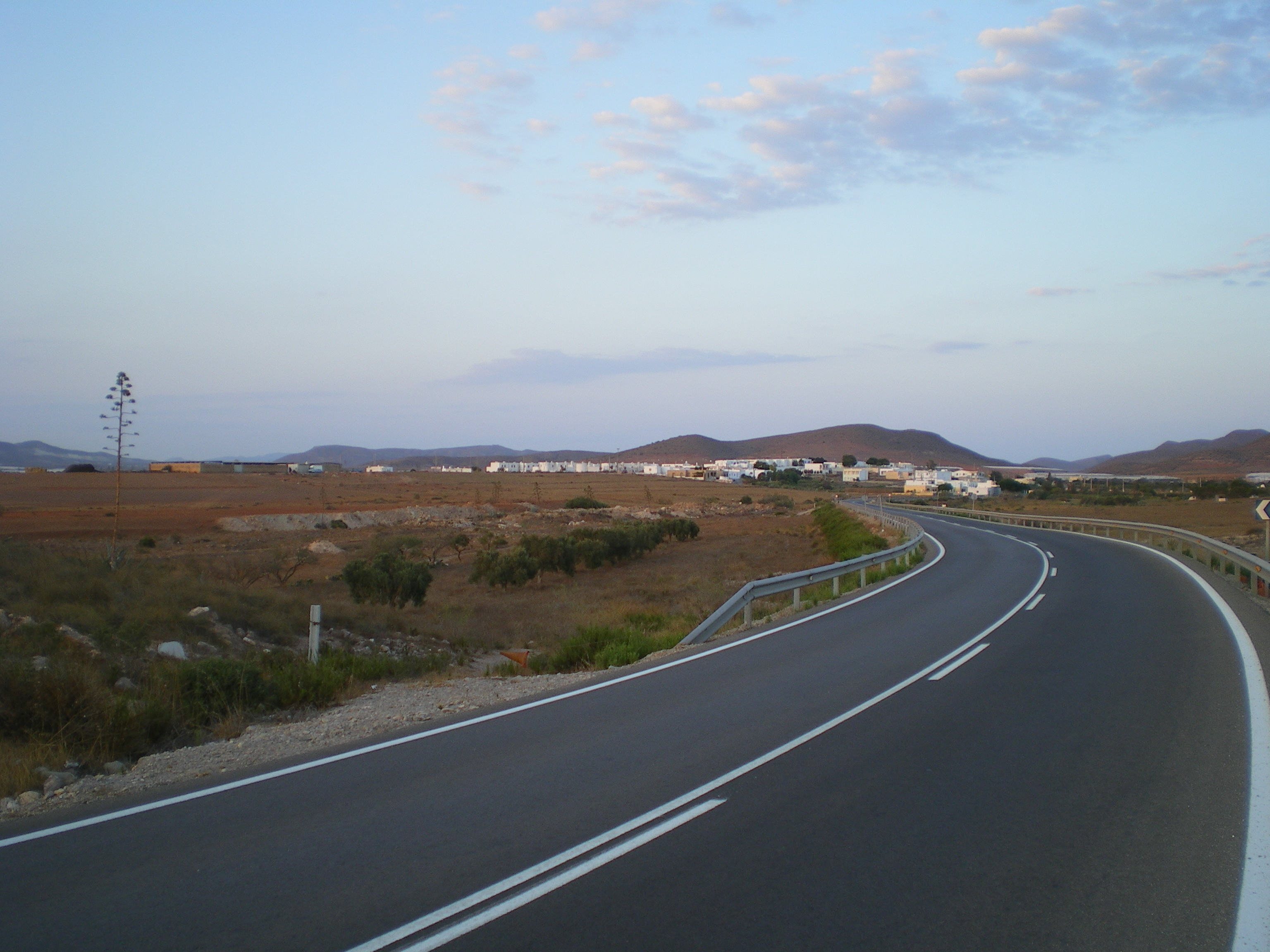

Los Albaricoques (the apricots) is a Spanish village in the Cabo de Gata-Níjar Natural Park – one of the White Towns of Andalusia. It was used as a location for multiple movies, such as For a Few Dollars More in which it was called Agua Caliente (hot springs).

It was also used for the Spaghetti Westerns "A Fistful of Dollars", "Day of Anger", "Death Rides a Horse", "A Long Ride From Hell" and for the American production "El Condor".

The town has roads named after actors Clint Eastwood and Lee Van Cleef and director Sergio Leone.
