= Carboneras =

- Coat of arms
- Interactive map of Carboneras
- Coordinates: 36°59′57″N 1°53′32″W
- Country: Spain
- Community: Andalusia
- Province: Almería

Government
  - Mayor: José Luis Amérigo Fernández (PSOE) (2019)

Area
  - Total: 95.46 km^{2} (36.86 sq mi)
- Elevation: 10 m (33 ft)

Population (2025-01-01)
  - Total: 8,458
  - Density: 88.60/km^{2} (229.5/sq mi)
- Demonym: Carbonero
- Time zone: UTC+1 (CET)
  - Summer (DST): UTC+2 (CEST)
- Climate: BWh

Carboneras is a municipality of Almería province, in the autonomous community of Andalusia, Spain.

== Demographics ==
Historical population
Year	Pop.	±%
1999	6,360	—
2000	6,530	+2.7%
2001	6,660	+2.0%
2002	6,777	+1.8%
2003	6,996	+3.2%
2004	7,100	+1.5%
2005	7,267	+2.4%
2006	7,508	+3.3%
2007	7,570	+0.8%
2008	7,787	+2.9%
2009	7,964	+2.3%
2010	8,123	+2.0%
2011	8,189	+0.8%
2012	8,081	−1.3%
2013	8,035	−0.6%
2014	7,852	−2.3%
2017	7,837	−0.2%
2018	7,757	−1.0%
2019	8,004	+3.2%
Source: INE (Spain)

== See also ==
- List of municipalities in Almería
