= Níjar =

- Municipality
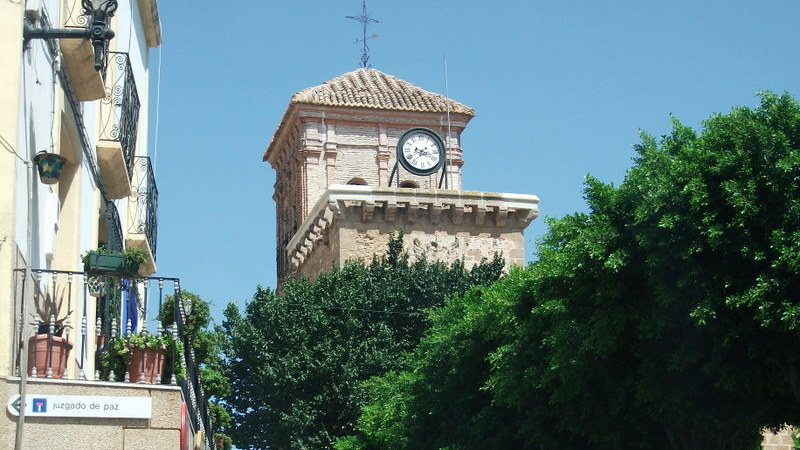

- Flag Coat of arms
- Interactive map of Níjar
- Coordinates: 36°57′57″N 2°12′24″W
- Country: Spain
- Autonomous community: Andalusia
- Province: Almería

Government
  - Mayor: Esperanza Perez (PSOE)

Area
  - Total: 601 km^{2} (232 sq mi)
- Elevation: 356 m (1,168 ft)

Population (2025-01-01)
  - Total: 33,319
  - Density: 55.4/km^{2} (144/sq mi)
- Time zone: UTC+1 (CET)
  - Summer (DST): UTC+2 (CEST)
- Climate: BSk

Níjar (Spanish pronunciation: [ˈnixaɾ]) is a Spanish municipality in the province of Almería, Andalusia. It lies in the eastern part of Almería, in the Sierra de Alhamilla and the south-eastern Mediterranean coast, in the Campo de Níjar, near the Cabo de Gata-Níjar Natural Park.

Níjar covers an area of 599.8 square kilometres. Its population of 17,824 (2002) is mainly concentrated in the cities of Campohermoso, San Isidro, and Níjar.

The main sources of income are agriculture, especially in the growing of greenhouse crops, and tourism, especially the watersports centre of San José.

== Demographics ==
Historical population
Year	Pop.	±%
1999	16,083	—
2000	16,269	+1.2%
2001	18,371	+12.9%
2002	19,332	+5.2%
2003	20,810	+7.6%
2004	21,306	+2.4%
2005	24,435	+14.7%

== See also ==
- List of municipalities in Almería
