= Christian monasticism before 451 =

Monasticism (from the Greek word monachos meaning 'alone') is a way of life where a person lives outside of society, under religious vows that may restrict where they live, how they may travel, what relationships they may form and what, if any, property they may own. Vows may additionally describe the services or duties they are to perform, such as charitable duties to the poor.

Christian monasticism developed as a spontaneous religious movement, with individuals and groups withdrawing from society throughout the centuries. By the early 5th century, thousands of Christians had chosen to live outside of society. The Council of Chalcedon in 451 officially recognized the Christian monastic way of life, placing all monastic communities and hermits under the authority and supervision of bishops. This move restricted the freedom of movement for monastic individuals.

== Origins ==
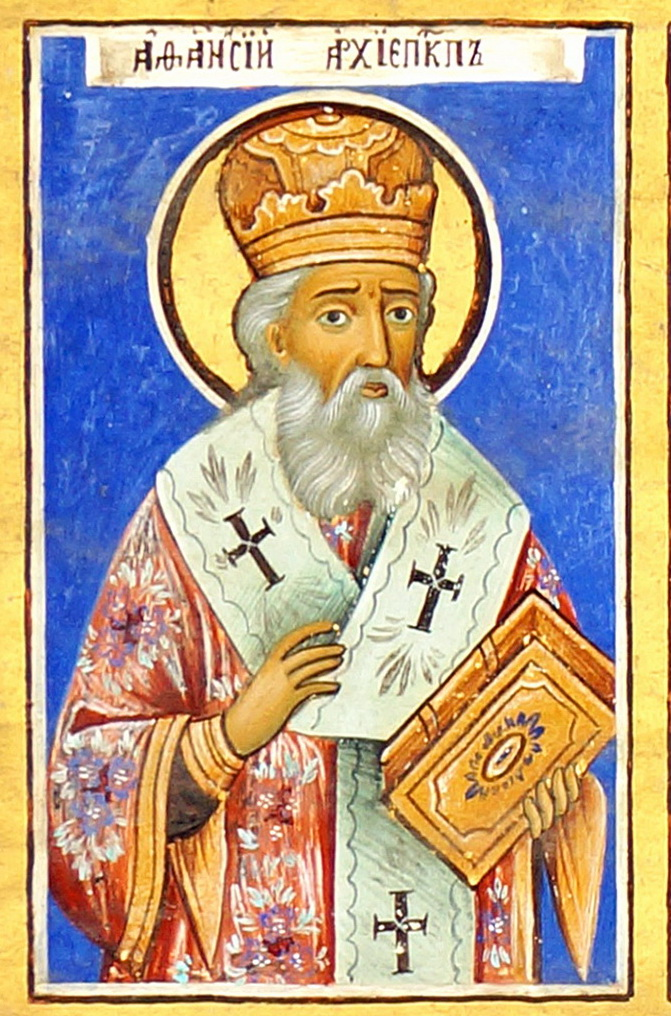
Icon of Athanasius of Alexandria at Rila monastery. His biography of Anthony the Great was vital for acceptance of Christian monasticism as orthodox practice

Egypt was the motherland of Christian monasticism; it came into existence there in the middle of the third century. Paul of Thebes is recognised as the first lone hermit who claimed to have lived alone in the desert for 97 years. Paul had initially sought shelter in the desert to avoid being persecuted during the Decian persecution. The first monk is seen as being St. Anthony. In the year 285, he went into the wilderness, being no longer content with the life of the ascetic. His reputation for holiness attracted a growing circle of followers and in 305 he organised a monastic life for them. He is considered the first of the Desert Fathers. Melania the Elder is seen as one of the first Desert Mothers in the 370s. Anthony's fame spread throughout the Christian world, largely due to the popularity of his biography that had been composed by Athanasius, the patriarch of Alexandria, who himself earned fame for his spirited defense of Trinitarianism against Arianism in & following the First Council of Nicaea.

Choosing to live in poverty voluntarily, by giving up all worldly possessions, was a challenging concept until the establishment of monasteries. Early Christian figures such as Origen, Cyprian, and Pamphilus had to show, through their own lives, that a monastic lifestyle - living in a religious community separate from society - was feasible. The full practice of obeying the third Evangelical counsel concerning obedience to religious authority only became possible after the idea of monastic life had grown and evolved beyond being just about living alone as a hermit.

In ante-Nicene period, ascetics a man who wished to lead a spiritual life could lead a single life, practice long and frequent fasts, abstain from meat and wine, and support himself, if he were able, by some small handicraft, keeping only enough money as was absolutely necessary for his own sustenance, and giving the rest to the poor. If he were an educated man, he might be employed by the Church in the capacity of catechist. Very often he would don the kind of dress which marked the wearer as a philosopher of an austere school.

In Egypt, at the time when St. Anthony first embraced the ascetic life, there were a number of ascetics emulating Paul of Thebes who were living in huts outside towns and villages, in order to escape the Diocletianic persecution. When St. Anthony died (356 or 357), two types of monasticism flourished in Egypt. There were villages or colonies of hermits - the eremitical type; and monasteries in which a community life was led - the cenobitic type.

The Greek word μοναχός (monachós), which is now typically used to refer to a monk, was first used to mean 'monk' in a papyrus discovered around the 1970s. It contains a legal petition from June 324 AD filed by Aurelius Isidorus, a man from the town of Karanis in Egypt. This indicates that monasticism was already well established in Egypt during the early 4th century.

== The hermit life ==
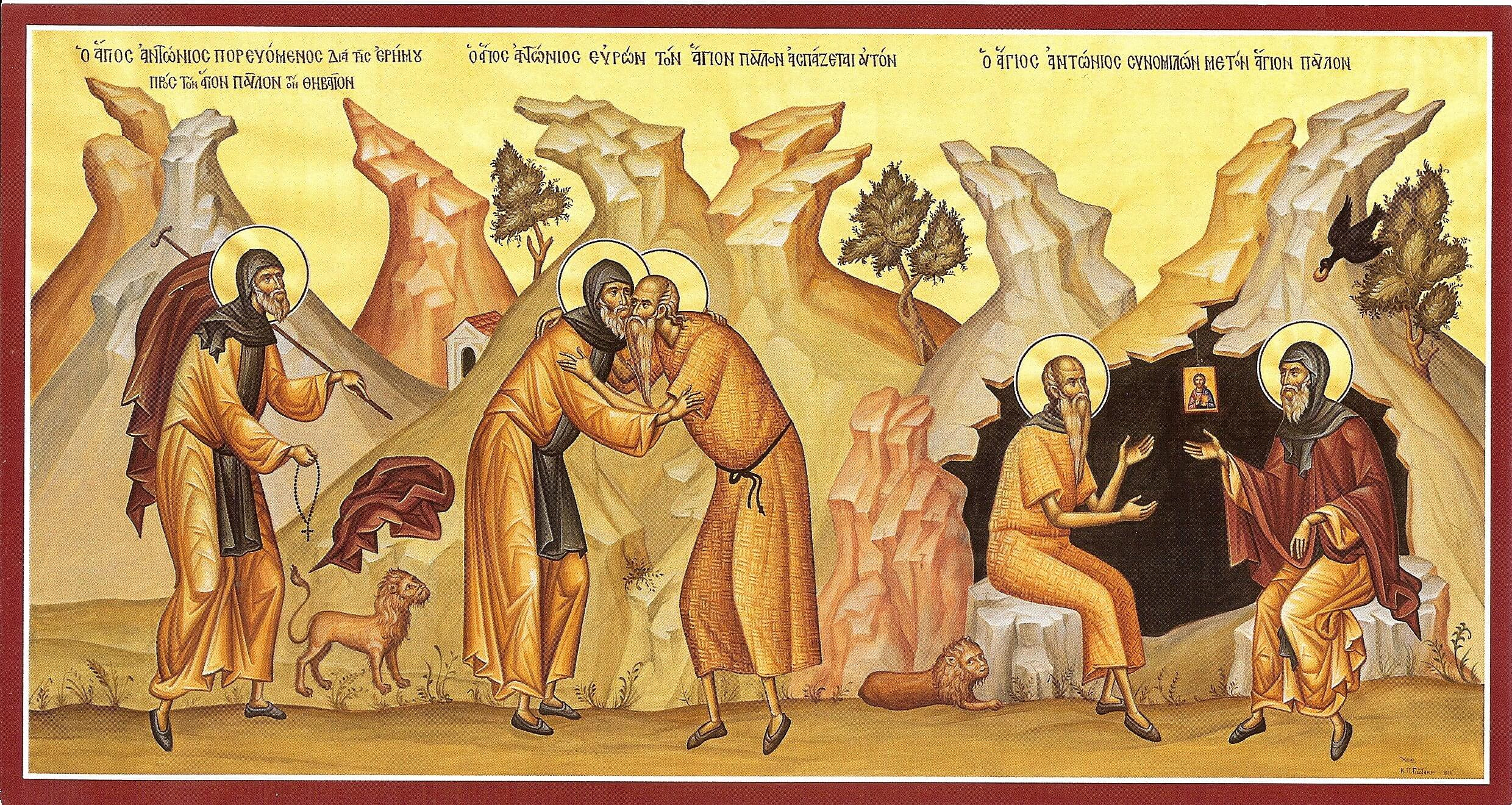
Byzantine icon of Anthony the Great meeting Paul of Thebes

The monasticism established under St Anthony's direct influence became the norm in Northern Egypt. In contrast to the fully coenobitical system, established by Pachomius in the South, it continued to be of a semi-eremitical character, the monks living commonly in separate cells or huts, and coming together only occasionally for church services; and the life they lived was not a community life according to rule. This was the form of monastic life in the deserts of Nitria and Scete, as portrayed by Palladius and Cassian. Such groups of semi-independent hermitages were later on called Lauras, or Lavras.

A brief survey of the opening chapters of Palladius's Lausiac History will serve as a description of the former type.

Palladius was a monk from Palestine who, in 388, went to Egypt. On landing at Alexandria he put himself in the hands of a priest named Isidore, who in early life had been a hermit at Nitria and now apparently presided over a hospice at Alexandria without in any way abating the austerity of his life. By the advice of Isidore, Palladius placed himself under the direction of a hermit named Dorotheus who lived six miles outside Alexandria, with whom he was to pass three years learning to subdue his passions and then to return to Isidore to receive higher spiritual knowledge. Dorotheus spent his days gathering stones to build cells for other hermits and his nights weaving ropes from palm leaves. Although he never lay down to sleep, he occasionally fell asleep while working or eating. Palladius, who seemed to have lived in his cell, learned from other solitaries that this had been Dorotheus's practice since his youth. Palladius's health deteriorated before he completed his time with Dorotheus, but he spent three years in Alexandria and its vicinity, visiting hermitages and getting to know around 2,000 monks. From Alexandria, he traveled to Nitria, a monastic village with about 5,000 solitaries. There were no specific monastic rules; some solitaries lived alone while others lived in small groups. They gathered at the church on Saturdays and Sundays, where eight priests served, with the oldest celebrating, preaching, and judging, while the others assisted. All engaged in weaving flax, and there were bakeries providing bread not only for the village but also for solitaries living in the surrounding desert. Doctors were available, and wine was sold. Strangers were welcomed in a guesthouse and, if they could read, were lent books. They could stay as long as they wished but were expected to do some work after a week. But, though there was no monastic rule at Nitria, there was municipal law, the outward symbol of which was three whips suspended from three palm trees, one for monks who might be guilty of some fault, one for thieves who might be caught prowling about, and the third for strangers who misbehaved. Further into the desert was a place called "The Cells", or Cellia, whither the more perfect withdrew. This is described by the author of the "Historia monachorum in Aegypto". Here the solitaries lived in cells so far apart that they were out of sight and out of hearing from one another. Like those of Nitria, they met only on Saturdays and Sundays at church, whither some of them had to travel a distance of three or four miles. Often their death was only discovered by their absence from church.

== The collective life ==
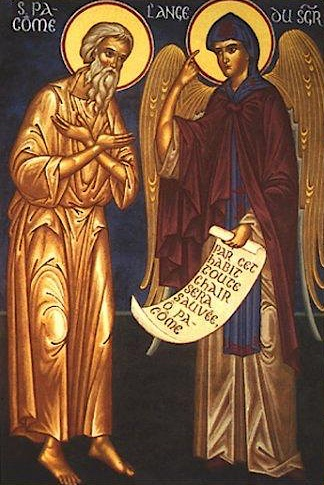
Byzantine icon of Pachomius the Great receiving the monastic rules from an angel

In strong contrast with the individualism of the eremitical life was the rigid discipline which prevailed in the cenobitical monasteries founded by St. Pachomius. When, in 313, Constantine I was at war with Maxentius, Pachomius, still a pagan, was forcibly enlisted together with a number of other young men, and placed on board a ship to be carried down the Nile to Alexandria. At some town at which the ship touched, the recruits were overwhelmed with the kindness of the Christians. Pachomius at once resolved to be a Christian and carried out his resolution as soon as he was dismissed from military service. He began as an ascetic in a small village, taking up his abode in a deserted temple of Serapis and cultivating a garden on the produce of which he lived and gave alms. The fact that Pachomius made an old temple of Serapis his abode was enough for an ingenious theory that he was originally a pagan monk.

Pachomius next embraced the eremitical life and prevailed upon an old hermit named Palemon to take him as his disciple and share his cell with him. He later left Palemon and founded his first monastery at Tabennisi near Denderah. Before he died, in 346, he had under him eight or nine large monasteries of men, and two of women. From a secular point of view, a Pachomian monastery was an industrial community in which almost every kind of trade was practised. Monks had ships of their own on the Nile, which conveyed their agricultural produce and manufactured goods to the market and brought back what the monasteries required. From the spiritual point of view, the Pachomian monk was a severe way of religious living.

A Pachomian monastery was a collection of buildings surrounded by a wall. The monks were distributed in houses, each house containing about forty monks. Three or four houses constituted a tribe. There would be thirty to forty houses in a monastery. There was an abbot over each monastery, and provosts with subordinate officials over each house. The monks were divided into houses according to the work they were employed in or what area (or language) they were from. On Saturdays and Sundays all the monks assembled in the church for Mass; on other days the Office and other spiritual exercises were celebrated in the houses.

Abbot Edward Joseph Aloysius Butler, wrote that “The fundamental idea of St Pachomius’s rule was to establish a moderate level of observance (moderate in comparison with the life led by the hermits) which might be obligatory on all; and then to leave it open to each - and to indeed encourage each - to go beyond the fixed minimum, according as he was prompted by his strength, his courage, and his zeal". This is strikingly illustrated in the rules concerning food. According to St. Jerome, in the preface to his translation of the Rule of Pachomius, the tables were laid twice a day except on Wednesdays and Fridays, which, outside the seasons of Easter and Pentecost were fast days. Some only took very little at the second meal; some at one or other of the meals confined themselves to a single food; others took just a morsel of bread. Some abstained altogether from the community meal; for these bread, water, and salt were placed in their cell.

Pachomius appointed his successor a monk named Petronius, who died within a few months, having likewise named his successor, Horsiesi. In Horsiesi's time the order was threatened with a schism. The abbot of one of the houses wished to sell his produce for the sole benefit of his own monastery. Horsiesi appointed Theodore, a favourite disciple of Pachomius, his coadjutor. When Theodore died, in 368, Horsiesi was able to resume the government of the order. This threatened schism reveals a feature connected with Pachomius' foundation which is never again seen in the East, and only appeared in the West many centuries later. "Like Cîteaux in a later age", writes Abbot Butler, "it almost at once assumed the shape of a fully organized congregation or order, with a superior general and a system of visitation and general chapters - in short, all the machinery of a centralized government, such as does not appear again in the monastic world until the Cistercian and the Mendicant Orders arose in the twelfth and thirteenth centuries" (op. cit., I,235).

== The White Monastery ==
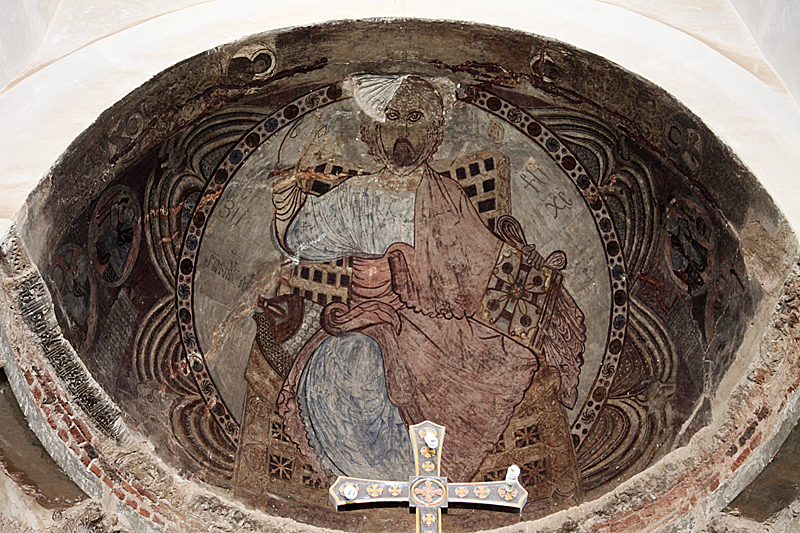
Coptic depiction of Christ Pantocrator at the White Monastery

Shortly after the middle of the fourth century, two monks, Pigol and Pishoy, changed their eremitical monasteries into cenobitical ones. Pigol and his nephew Shenoute (alternative: Shenouda, Schenoudi, Schnoudi, or Senuti) were reformers and Shenoute became head of the White Monastery of Sohag. He made changes to the monastery, including a requirement for new novices to live outside the monastery for a period of time and teaching his monks and nuns to read.

== Spread ==
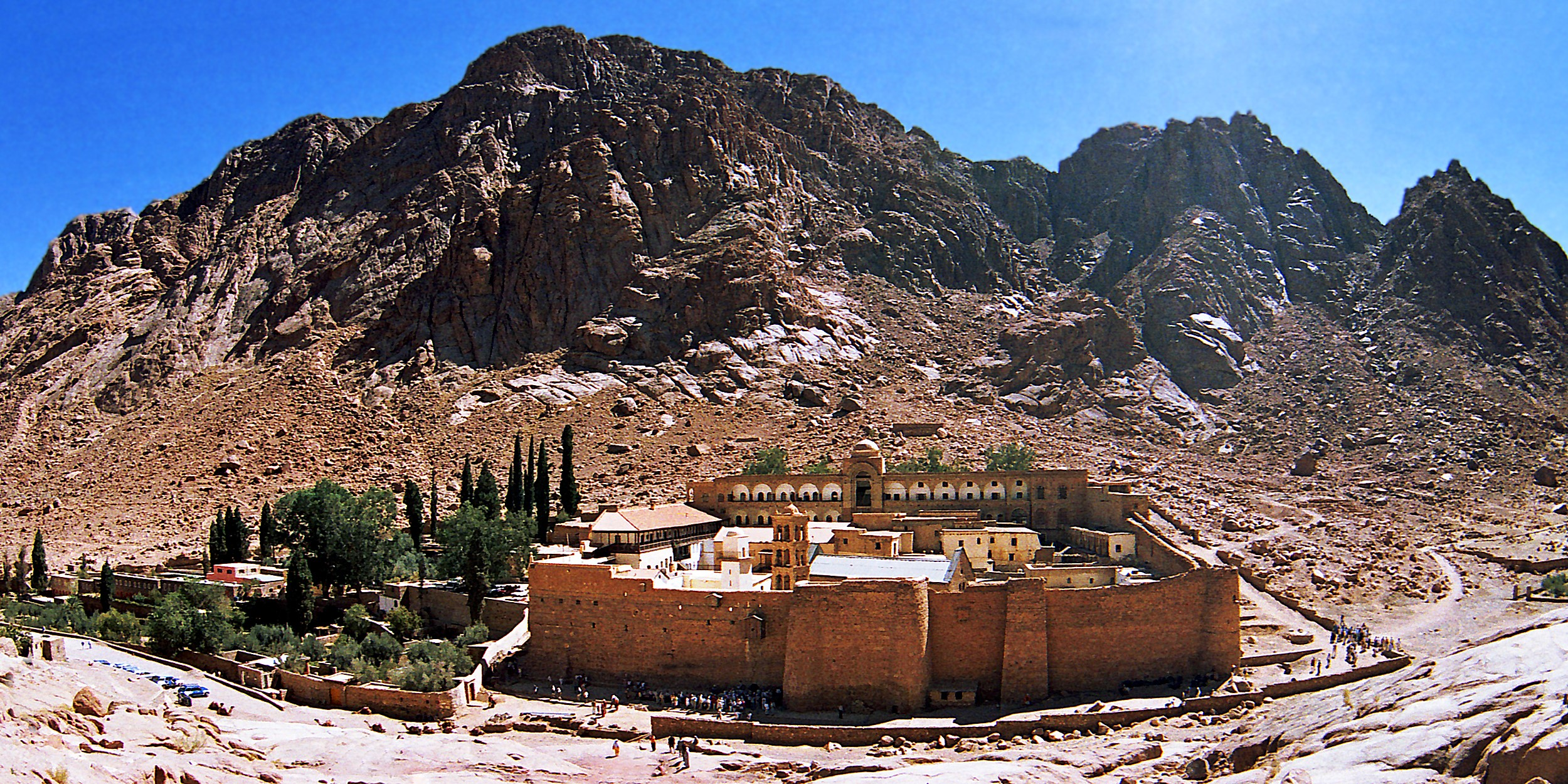
Saint Catherine's Monastery at Mount Sinai

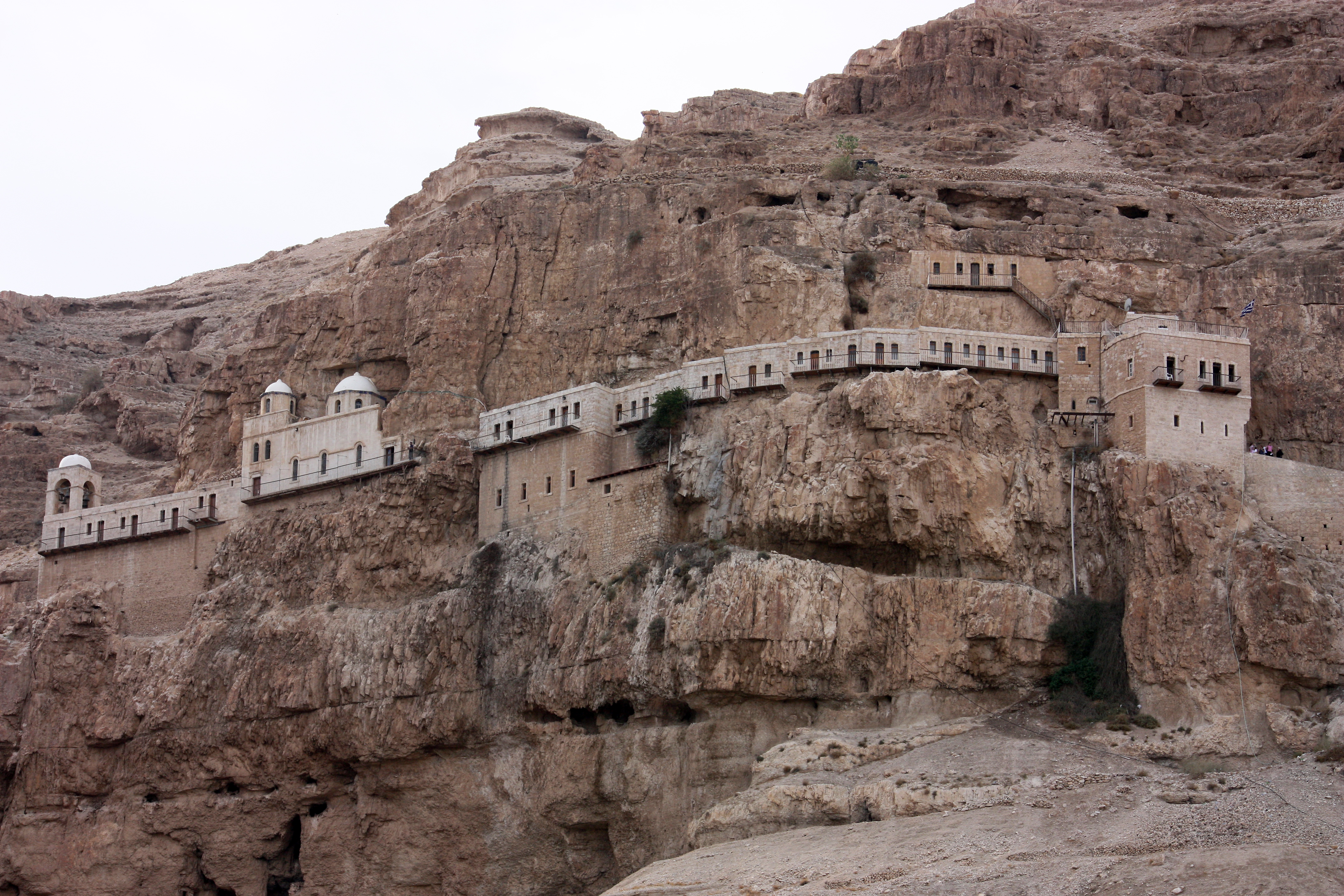
Monastery of the Temptation at Jericho

With the exception of a single Pachomian monastery at Canopus, near Alexandria, the cenobitic monasteries were in the South, and confined to a relatively small area. The eremitical monasteries, on the contrary, were everywhere, and especially in the North. These latter were thus far more accessible to pilgrims visiting Egypt and so became the patterns or models for the rest of the Christian world. It was the eremitical, not the cenobitical, type of monasticism which went forth from Egypt.

Monasticism at a very early date spread eastwards. The solitaries had a special predilection for Scriptural sites. Many were attracted to Mount Sinai, in spite of the danger of captivity or death at the hands of Arab nomads. In 373 a number of solitaries inhabited this mountain, living on dates and other fruit. Forty of them were massacred in 373, and on the same day another group of solitaries at Raithe (supposed to be Elim) were killed by a second band of barbarians. These events were described by eyewitnesses (Tillemont, "H.E.", VII, 573-80). The same kind of life was being led at Mount Sinai, and a similar experience was undergone some twenty years later when St. Nilus was there.

St. Hilarion, who for a time had been a disciple of St. Anthony in Egypt, propagated monasticism of the eremitical type first in the region of Gaza near his native village of Thabata where he founded a monastery and then in Cyprus. His friend, St. Epiphanius, after practising the monastic life in Egypt, founded a monastery near Eleutheropolis in Palestine somewhere about 330 or perhaps a little later.

In Jerusalem and its neighbourhood there were numerous monasteries at a very early date. There was the monastery on the Mount of Olives, from which Palladius went forth on his tour of the Egyptian monasteries; there were two monasteries for women in Jerusalem, built by Melania and her granddaughter Melania the Younger respectively. At Bethlehem, St. Paula founded three monasteries for women and one for men about 387. There was, besides, in Bethlehem the monastery where Cassian some years before began his religious life. The Lauras, which were very numerous, formed a conspicuous feature in Palestinian monasticism. The first appears to have been founded before 334 by St. Chariton at Pharan, a few miles from Jerusalem; later on two more were founded by the same saint at Jericho and at Suca.

St. Euthymius (473) founded another celebrated one in the Kidron Valley. Near Jericho was the lavra ruled over by St. Gerasimus (475). Some details concerning the rules of this laura have been preserved in a very ancient Life of St. Euthymius. It consisted of a cenobium where the cenobitic life was practised by novices and others less proficient. There were also seventy cells for solitaries. Five days in the week these latter lived and worked alone in their cells. On Saturday they brought their work to the cenobium, where, after receiving Holy Communion on Sundays, they partook of some cooked food and a little wine. The rest of the week their fare was bread, dates and water. When some of them asked to be allowed to heat some water, that they might cook some food and to have a lamp to read by, they were told that if they wished to live thus they had better take up their abode in the cenobium (Acta Sanctorum., March 1, 386,87).

== Antioch ==
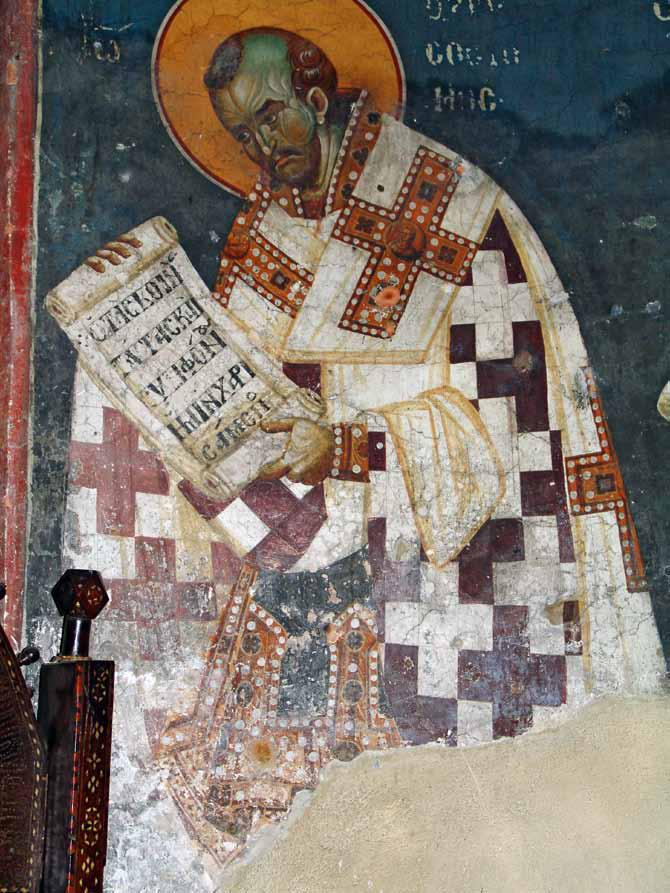
Byzantine depiction of John Chrysostom at the Church of St. Mary Peribleptos

When John Chrysostom was a young man, Antioch had many ascetics and the neighbouring mountains were peopled with hermits. At one time there was tension among Christians (and pagans) against those who embraced this holy ascetic. This was the occasion of Chrysostom's treatise Against Those Who Oppose the Monastic Life, written sometime before 386, which was directed to parents whose sons were contemplating a monastic vocation. He wrote that it was customary for Antiochenes to send their sons to be educated by monks. Chrysostom's yielded to his mother's wishes and lived the ascetic life at home until her death; a scene between Chrysostom and his mother is at the beginning of the De Sacertio.

Palestine and Antioch are examples of the rapid spread of monasticism outside of Egypt. There is abundant evidence of the phenomenon in all the countries between the Mediterranean and Mesopotamia; and Mesopotamia, according to St Jerome, whose testimony is amply borne out by other writers, rivalled Egypt itself in the number and holiness of its monks (Comm. in Isaiam, V, xix).

== Basil ==
Byzantine style icon of Basil of Caesarea at the Basilian monastery of Stropkov

Basil the Great made a careful study of monasticism in Egypt, Palestine, Coelesyria and Mesopotamia before embracing the monastic life. The result was a decided preference for the cenobitic life. He founded several monasteries in Pontus, over one of which he himself for a time presided, and very soon monasteries, modelled after his, spread over the East.

His monks assembled together for "psalmody" and "genuflexions" seven times a day, in accordance with the Psalmist's "Septies in die laudem dixi tibi" (Ps. cxviii,164): at midnight ("Media nocte surgebam" - Ibid.,62), at evening, morning and midday (Ps. lv,18), at the third hour, the hour of Pentecost, and at the ninth, the sacred hour of the Passion. To complete the tale of seven, the midday prayer was divided into two parts separated by the community meal (Sermo "Asceticus", Benedictine edition, II,321).

Basil's monastic ideal is set forth in a collection of his writings known as the "Asceticon", or "Ascetica", the most important of which are the "Regulae fusius tractatae", a series of answers to questions, fifty-five in number, and the "Regulae brevius tractatae", in which three hundred and thirteen questions are briefly replied to. It must not be supposed that the "Regulae" form a rule, though it would be possible to go a good way towards constituting one out of them. They are answers to questions which would naturally arise among persons already in possession of a framework of customs or traditions. Sometimes they treat of practical questions, but as often as not they deal with matters concerning the spiritual life.

Basil did not draw up a rule but gave a model or pattern. He was not the founder of a religious order; no Eastern (except Pachomius) ever was. An order, as we now understand the term, is a purely Western Christian product. "It is not enough", says Pargoire, "to affirm that the Basilian Order is a myth. One must go farther and give up calling the Byzantine monks Basilians. Those most concerned have never taken this title, and no Eastern writer that I know of has ever bestowed it upon them" (Pargoire in "Dict. d'Archeologie chretienne", s.v. "Basile”), ie, every monastery is an order of its own. With Basil Eastern monasticism reached its final stage - communities of monks leading the contemplative life and devoting themselves wholly to prayer and work. The cenobitical life steadily became the normal form of the religious calling, and the eremitical one the exceptional form, requiring a long previous training.

== Later developments ==
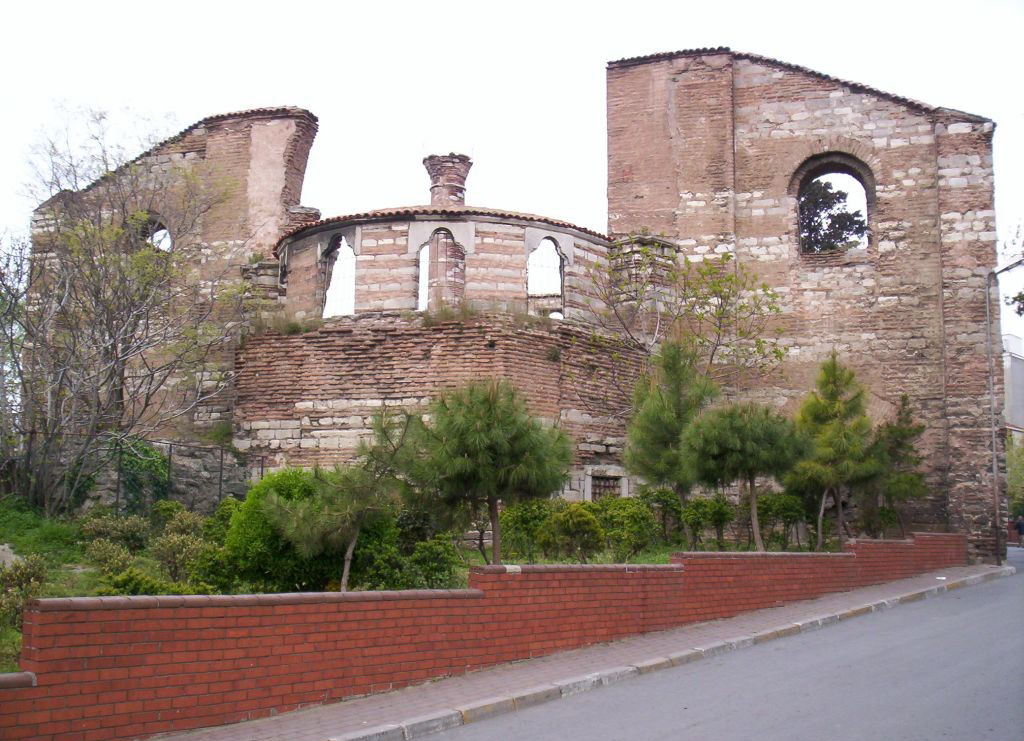
Ruins of the Monastery of Stoudios

Palestine, at the end of the fourth century, began to supersede Egypt as the centre of monasticism. The dweller in the laura was under an archimandrite or abbot.

By the time of Chalcedon, it was agreed that monasteries were not to be erected without the leave of the bishop; monks were to receive due honour, but were not to involve themselves with the affairs of Church or State. They were to be subject to the bishop, etc. (can.iv). Clerics and monks were not to serve in war or embrace a secular life (can.vii). Monasteries were not to be secularized (can.xxiv).

Basil states that solitary spots should be chosen as sites for monasteries. Nevertheless, they soon found their way into cities. According to one scholar, at least fifteen monasteries were founded at Constantinople in the time of Constantine the Great; but others affirm that the three most ancient ones only dated back to the time of Theodosius (375-95). In 518 there were at least fifty-four monasteries in Constantinople. Their names and those of their rulers are given in a petition addressed by the monks of Constantinople to Pope Hormisdas in 518.

== See also ==
- Pachomian monasteries
- Coptic monasticism
- Clasau, the early Welsh monasteries
- Members of the covenant
- Sinaites in Serbia
- Chronology of early Christian monasticism
