= May 16 (Eastern Orthodox liturgics) =

Day in the Eastern Orthodox liturgical calendar

Eastern Orthodox liturgical calendar
May 15	May 16	May 17
May 16 O.S. ≍ May 29 N.S. May 16 N.S ≍ May 3 O.S.

An Eastern Orthodox cross

May 16 in Eastern Orthodox liturgical calendars is a feast day and a day of commemoration of saints and martyrs. Although some Orthodox churches use the Revised Julian Calendar and others use the traditional Julian calendar, the fixed commemorations for their respective May 16 are broadly the same, no matter which calendar is used. (Note: Despite the dates being the same, the days to which they refer typically differ by 13 days. The notation Old Style or O.S. is sometimes used to indicate a date in the traditional Julian Calendar (the "Old Calendar"). The notation New Style or N.S. indicates a date in the Revised Julian calendar (the "New Calendar").)

== Saints ==
- Hieromartyr Alexander of Jerusalem, Archbishop (251) (Note: Also commemorated on December 12.)
- Saint Papylinus the Martyr, by the sword.
- Martyrs Bachtisius, Isaac and Symeon of Persia (339) (Note: See also: May 18.)
- Saint Theodore the Sanctified of Tabennisi, disciple of Saint Pachomios the Great (367)
- Martyrs Abda (Audas) and Abdjesus (Audiesus), successive bishops of Beth-Kashkar, and 38 other martyrs in the Persian Empire, under Ardashir II (376), including: (Note: It is well known that under the reign Shapur (309-379), Ardashir II had served as governor-King of Adiabene, where he had reportedly persecuted Christians.)

- 16 priests, 9 deacons, 6 monks, and 7 unnamed virgins, in Persia.

- Saint Neadius (Neadios), Bishop and Wonderworker. (Note: His memory is preserved in a poem by St. Joseph the Hymnographer (9th century) - (Parisian Codex 1575, sheet 846).)
- Saint Bardas, founder of the monastery of the Forerunner in Petra, Constantinople (5th-6th century)
- Martyrdom of the 44 Holy Sabaite fathers, monk-martyrs of the Great Lavra of St. Sabbas the Sanctified, massacred by the Bedouins (614) (Note: These are distinct from another group of Sabaite Fathers that are commemorated on March 20 († 796). "The Synaxarion wrongly attributes this massacre to the Blemmyes, probably through confusing it with the massacre of the monks of Raithu (14 Jan.).") (Note: See: (in Russian) Мученики лавры Саввы Освященного. Википедии. (Russian Wikipedia).)
- Martyr Peter of Blachernae (761) (Note: It appears that Saint Peter was an ascetic in the city of Petra. Later he was buried in a church at Blachernae.)
- Saint Thomas I, Patriarch of Jerusalem (820)
- Saint George of Mitylene, Bishop (821 or 842) (Note: His feast day is on April 7. May 16 is likely the feast day of the translation his relics.)
- Saint Nicholas Mystikos, Patriarch of Constantinople (925)

== Pre-Schism Western saints ==
- Saint Fort (Fort de Bordeaux), first Bishop of Bordeaux in France, venerated as a martyr (c. 1st century?) (Note: See: (in French) Saint Fort. Wikipédia. (French Wikipedia).)
- Saint Peregrinus, Bishop of Terni (138)
- Saint Peregrine of Auxerre, martyr, the first bishop of Auxerre and the builder of its first cathedral (261 or 304)
- Martyrs Felix and Gennadius, at Uzalis in Africa.
- Martyrs Vitus, Modestus, and Crescentia at Lucania (c. 303)
- Saint Hilary, Bishop of Pavia, one of the bishops in the north of Italy who fought against Arianism (376)
- Saint Possidius, Bishop of Calama in Numidia in North Africa, a friend of Saint Augustine of Hippo (c. 370 - c. 440)
- Saint Primael, ascetic, from Britain, he went to Brittany and became a hermit near Quimper (c. 450)
- Blessed child-saint Musa of Rome (5th century) (Note: See: (in Russian) Муза Римляныня. Википедии. (Russian Wikipedia).)
- Saint Carannog (Carantog, Caimach, Carnath), Welsh prince who aided St Patrick in the enlightenment of Ireland (5th century)
- Saint Fidolus (Phal), Abbot at Isle-Aumont, south of Troyes (c. 540 - 549)
- Saint Germerius, Bishop of Toulouse in France for fifty years (560)
- Saint Brendan the Navigator, abbot of Clonfert (c. 577)
- Saint Domnolus, Bishop of Le Mans (581)
- Saint Carantoc, an abbot who founded the church of Llangrannog in Wales (6th century) (Note: He is linked with Crantock in Cornwall and Carhampton in Somerset in England and was also venerated in Brittany.)
- Saint Honoratus of Amiens, the seventh Bishop of Amiens (c. 600)
- Saint Annobert (Alnobert), a monk at Almenêches, consecrated Bishop of Séez in France (c. 689)
- Saint Franchy (Francovæcus), a monk at St Martin de la Bretonnière in France, later a hermit in the Nivernais, Diocese of Nevers (7th century) (Note: The former church of Saint-Martin-de-la-Bretonnière is located in Sainte-Marie, Nièvre, France, and today is occupied by the (abandoned) cemetery of the members of the Rapine family.)

== Post-Schism Orthodox saints ==
- Saints Cassian (1537) and Laurence (1548), disciples of Venerable Cornelius of Komel, Abbots of Komel ("Korneliev" Monastery), Vologda.
- New Hieromartyr Teodor (Nestorović) of Vršac, Bishop of Vršac in Banat, Serbia (1594)
- New Martyr Nicholas of Metsovo, at Trikala, whose relics are at Meteora (1617)

=== New martyrs and confessors ===
- Venerable Hieromonk Matthew of Yaransk the Wonderworker ( 'Mitrophan Kuzmich Zvetsov' ) (1927) (Note: He is also commemorated on October 8 on the celebration of the "Synaxis of the Saints of Vyatka". Saint Matthew was born in the city of Vyatka (now Kirov); in 1891 he became a monk at the Monastery of St. Alexander Nevsky, and was tonsured with the name Matthew; here he practiced asceticism, obedience, and unceasing prayer, and God blessed him as a Wonderworker. He reposed in peace in 1927.) (Note: See: (in Russian) Матфей Яранский. Википедии. (Russian Wikipedia).)
- New Martyr Vukasin of Klepci, in Hercegovina, under the Ustashi terrorists (1943) (Note: See also: (in Serbian): Старац Вукашин. Serbian Wikipedia.)

== Other commemorations ==
- Foundation of the church of Saint Euphemia, near the Neorion (port facilities), by the Dolmabahçe Palace of Constantinople.
- Uncovering of the relics (1545) of Saint Ephraim, Abbot of Perekop, Wonderworker of Novgorod (1492) (Note: His feast day is on September 26.)
- Commemoration of Saint Macarius (Notaras) of Corinth (1805) in the village of Myloi, Samos island. (Note: His feast day is on April 17.)

== Icon gallery ==
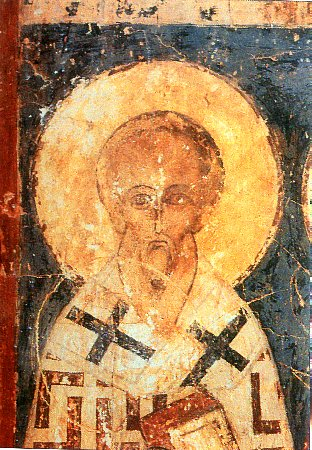
St. Alexander of Jerusalem.

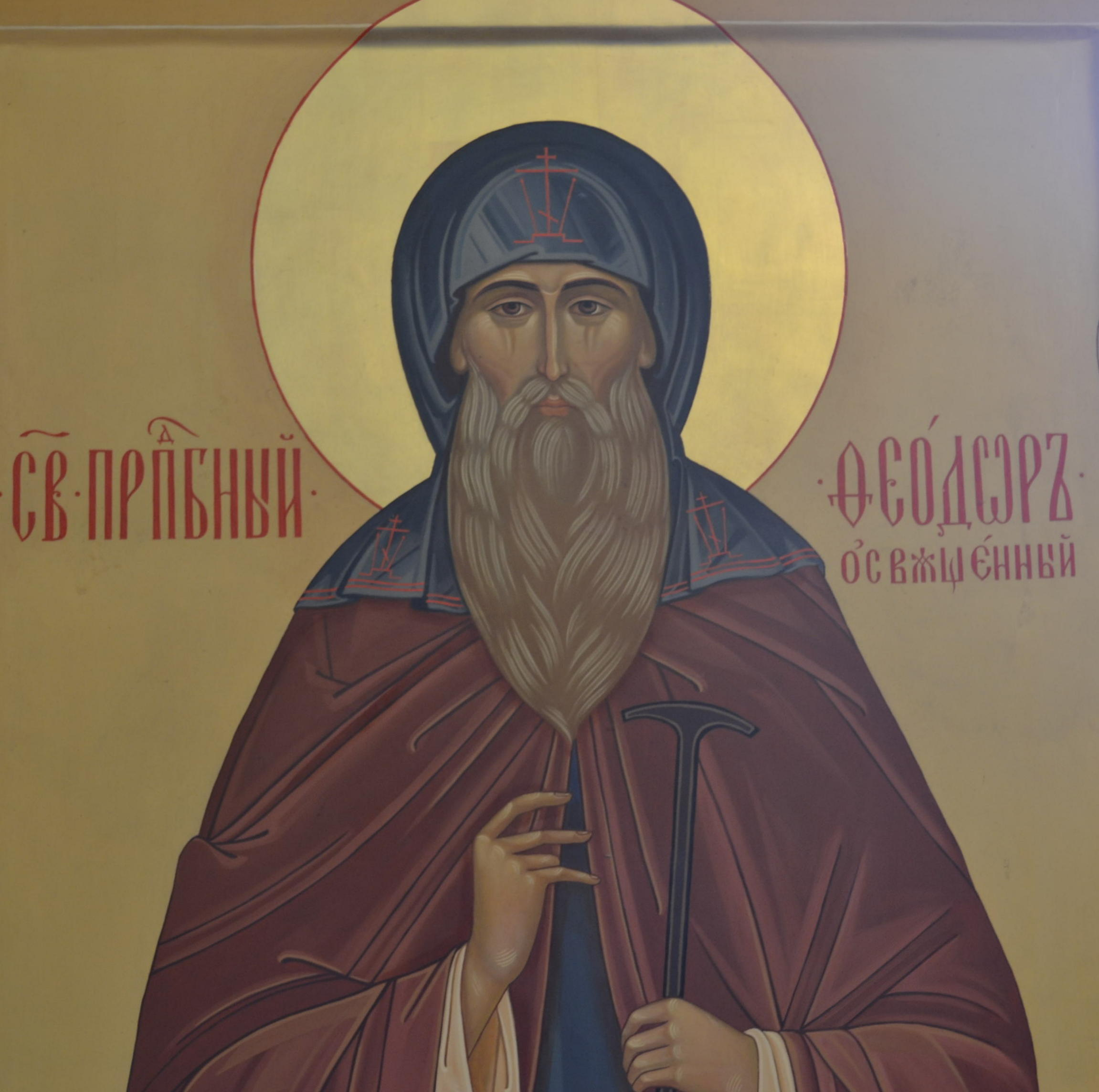
St. Theodore the Sanctified of Tabennisi.

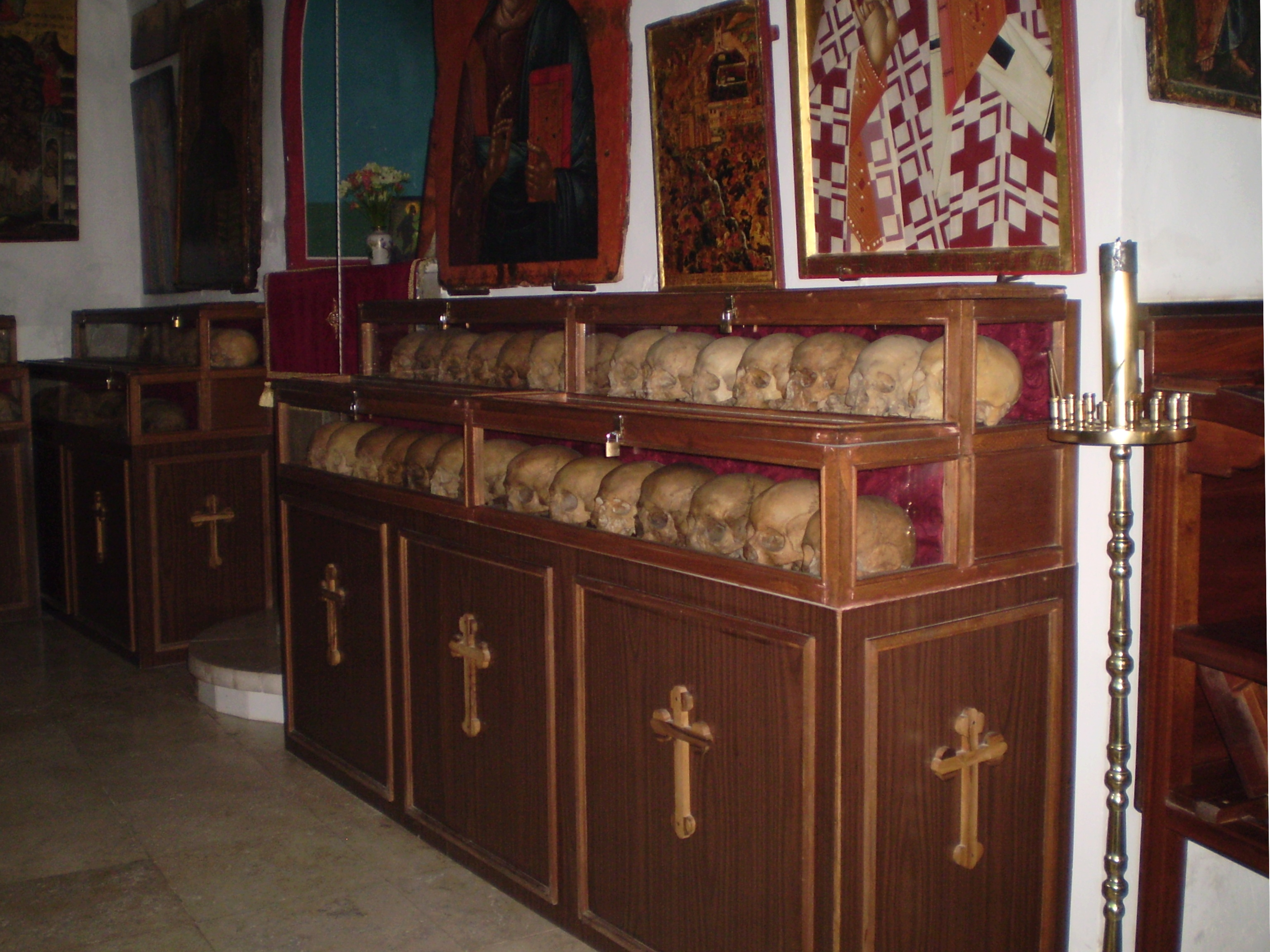
Skulls of monks killed by the Persians in 614 AD in Mar Saba, Kidron Valley, Palestine.

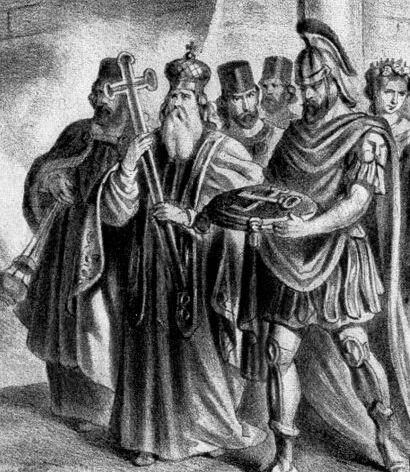
Patriarch Nicholas Mystikos.

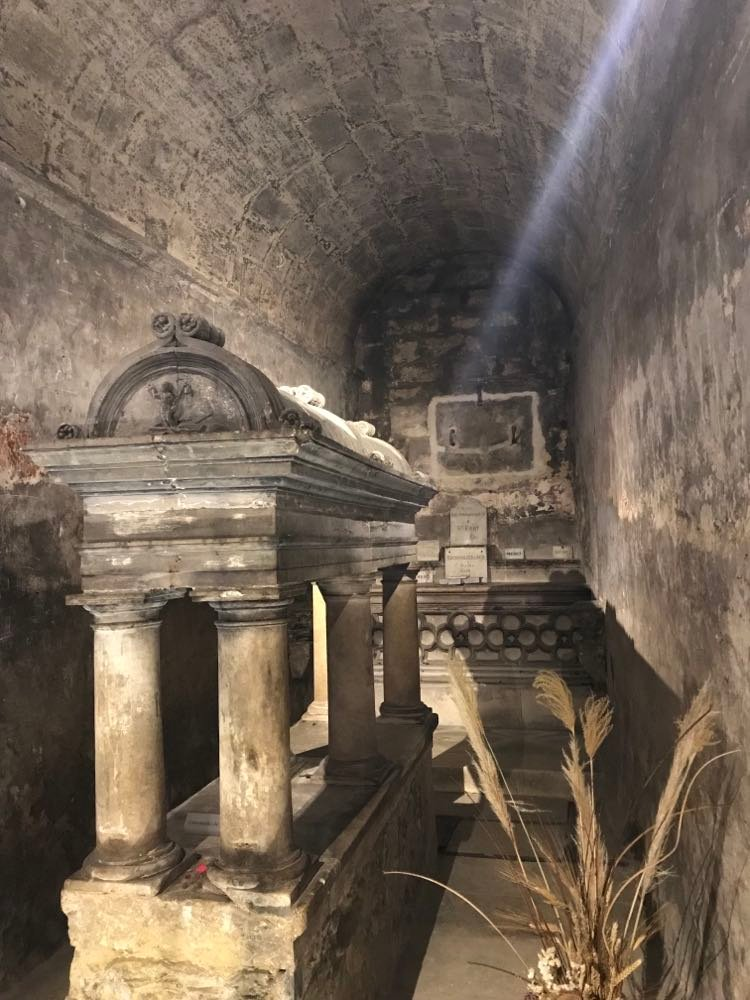
Tomb of Saint-Fort, Basilica of Saint-Seurin, Bordeaux.

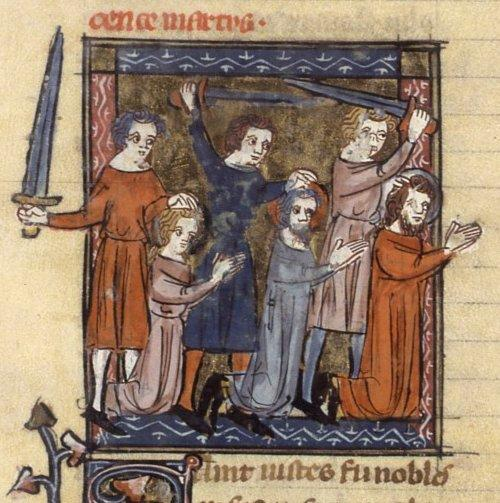
The martyrdom of Vitus, Modestus, and Crescentia.

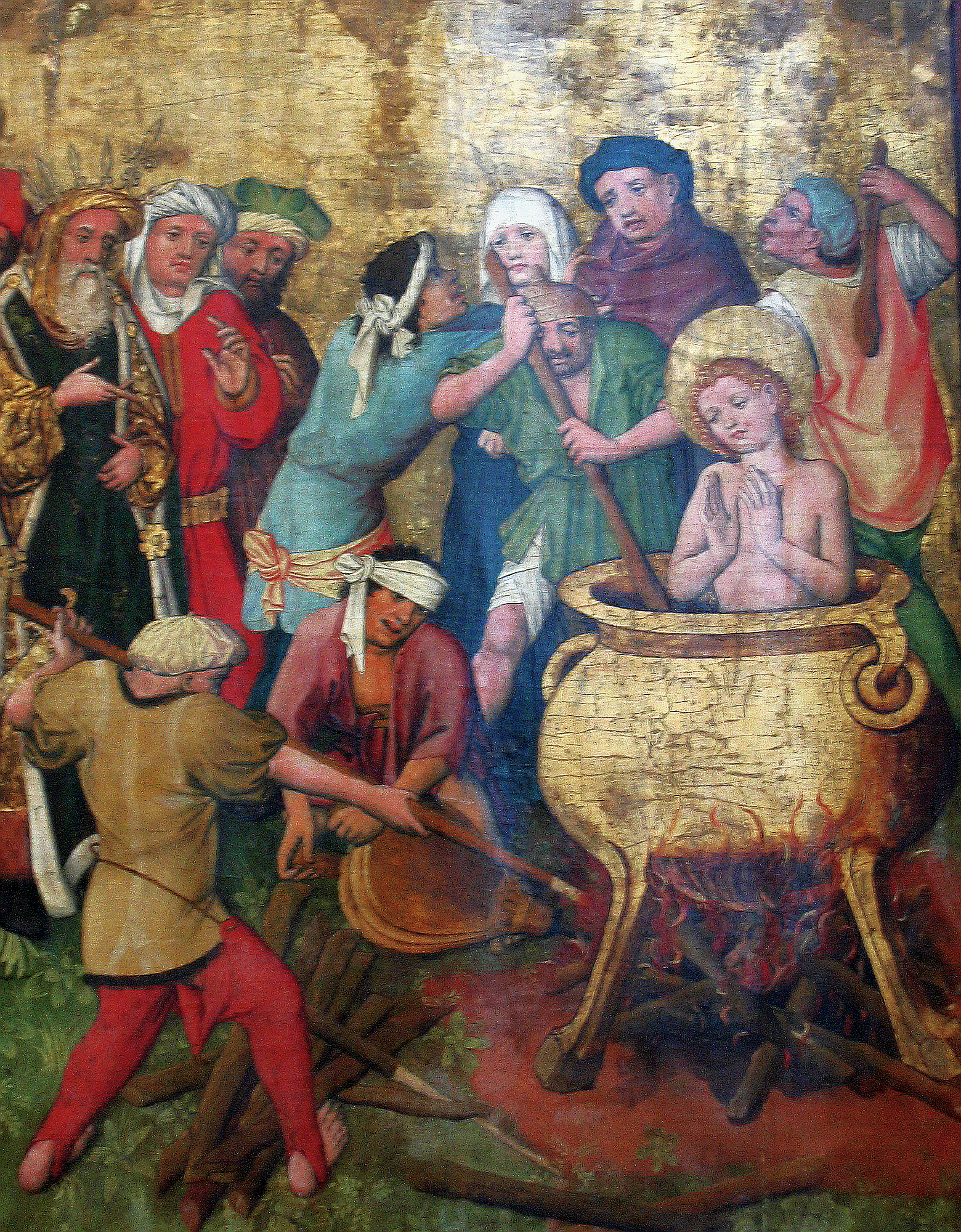
Martyrdom of Saint Vitus.

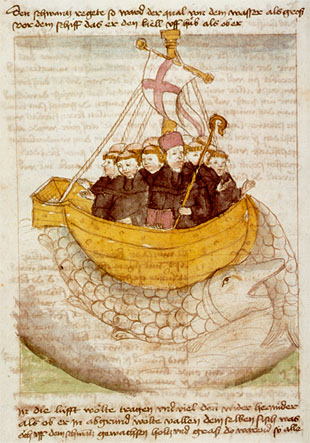
St. Brendan of Clonfert.

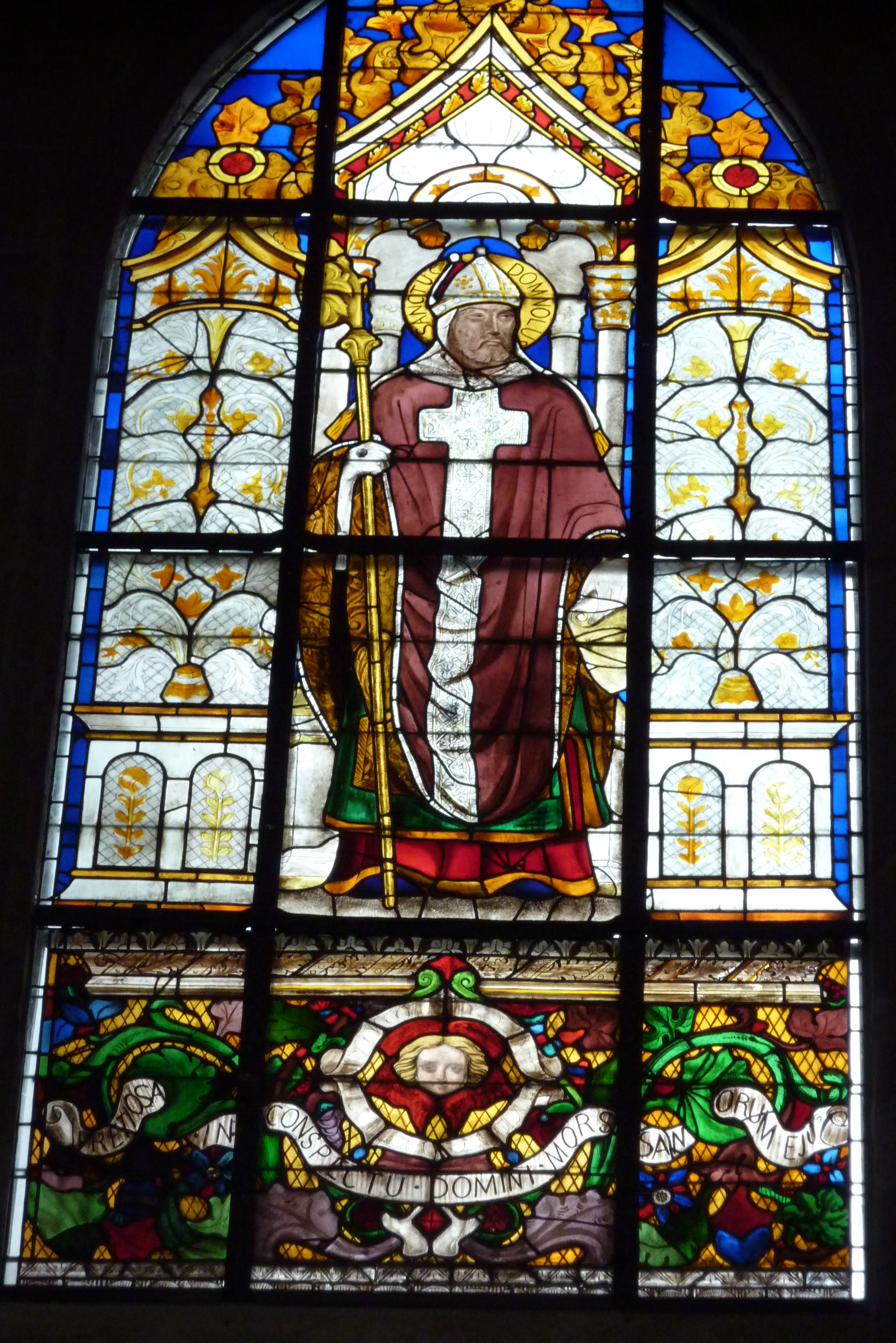
St. Domnolus, Bishop of Le Mans, stained glass.

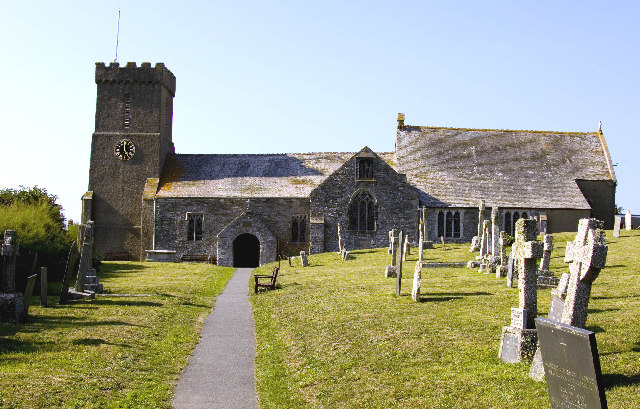
St. Carantoc's Church, Crantock.

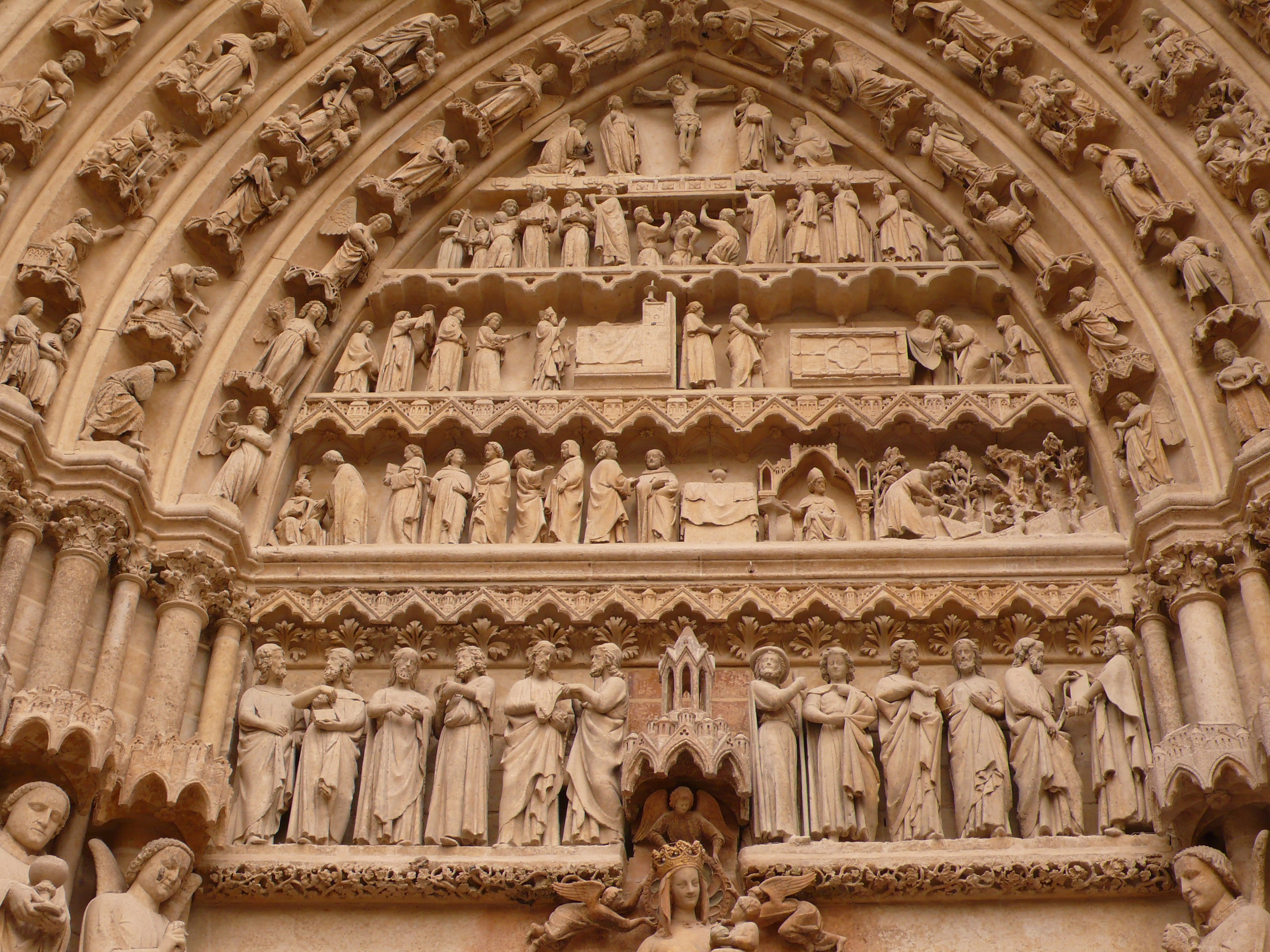
Tympanum of the southern door of the Cathedral of Amiens, showing the life of Saint Honoratus of Amiens, including his appointment as bishop, and translation of his relics.

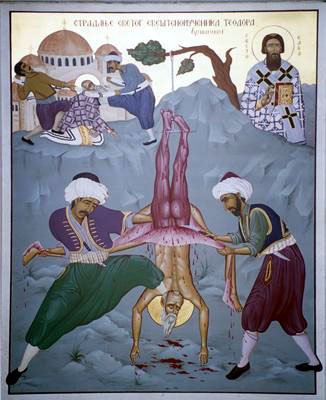
New Hieromartyr Teodor (Nestorović) of Vršac, Bishop of Vršac.

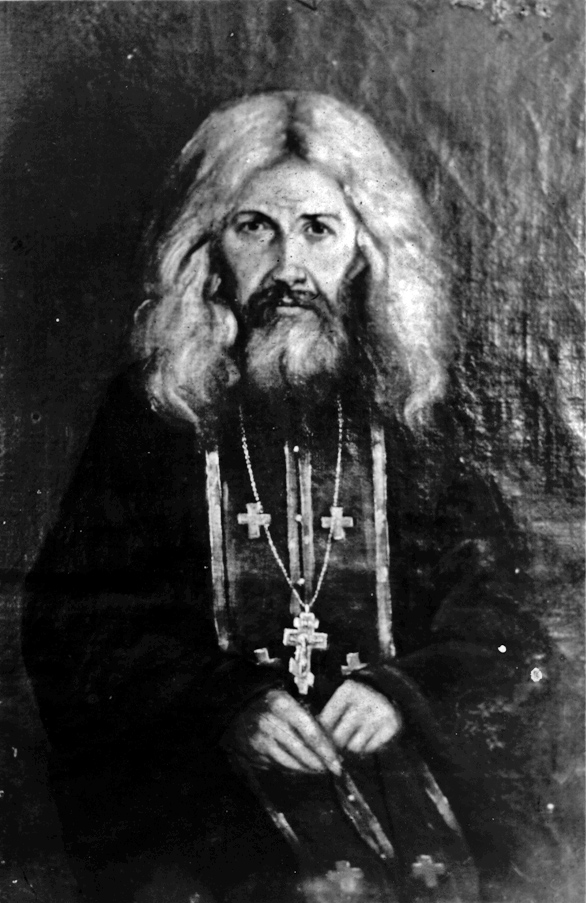
Venerable Hieromonk Matthew of Yaransk, the Wonderworker.

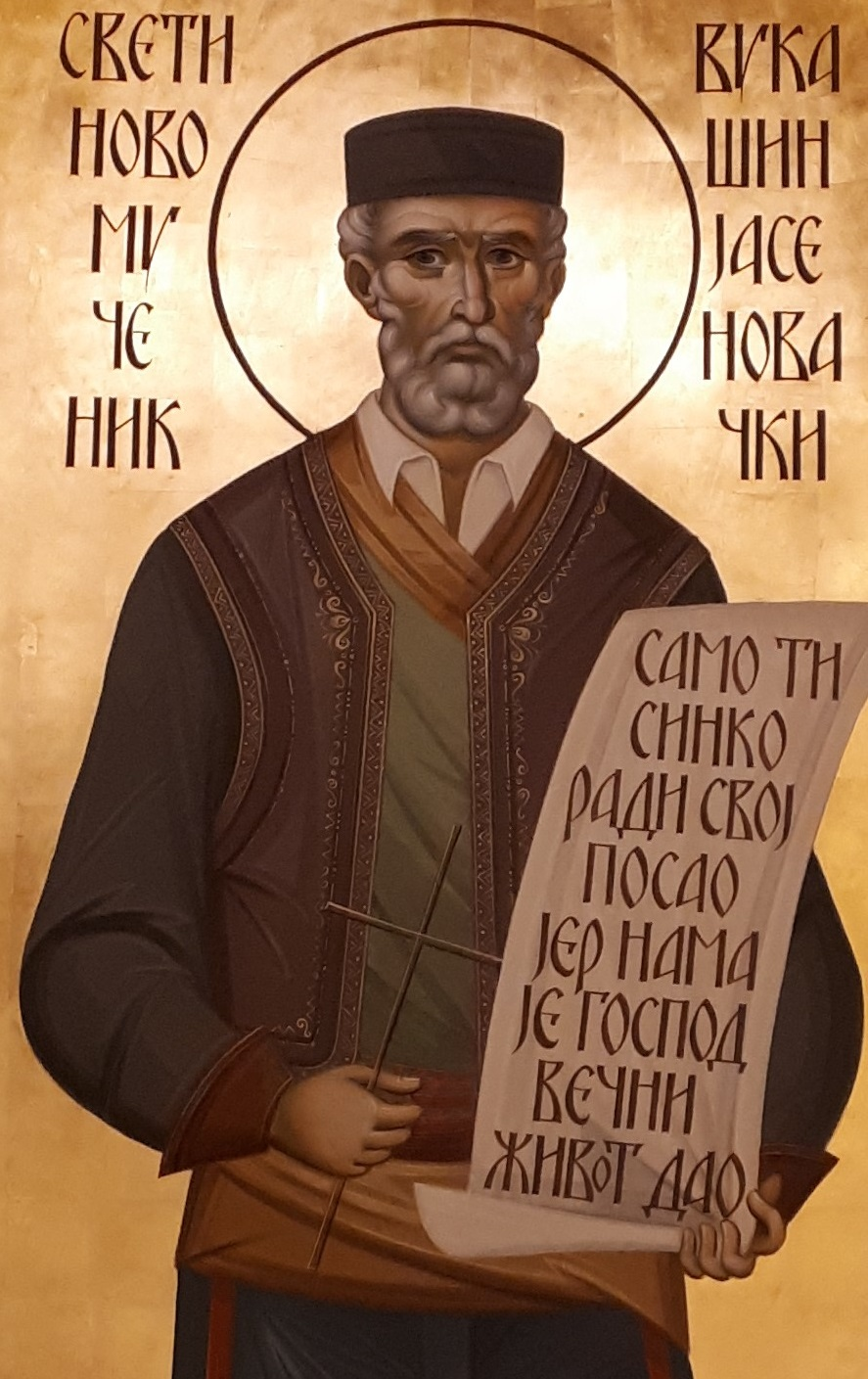
New Martyr Vukasin of Klepci.

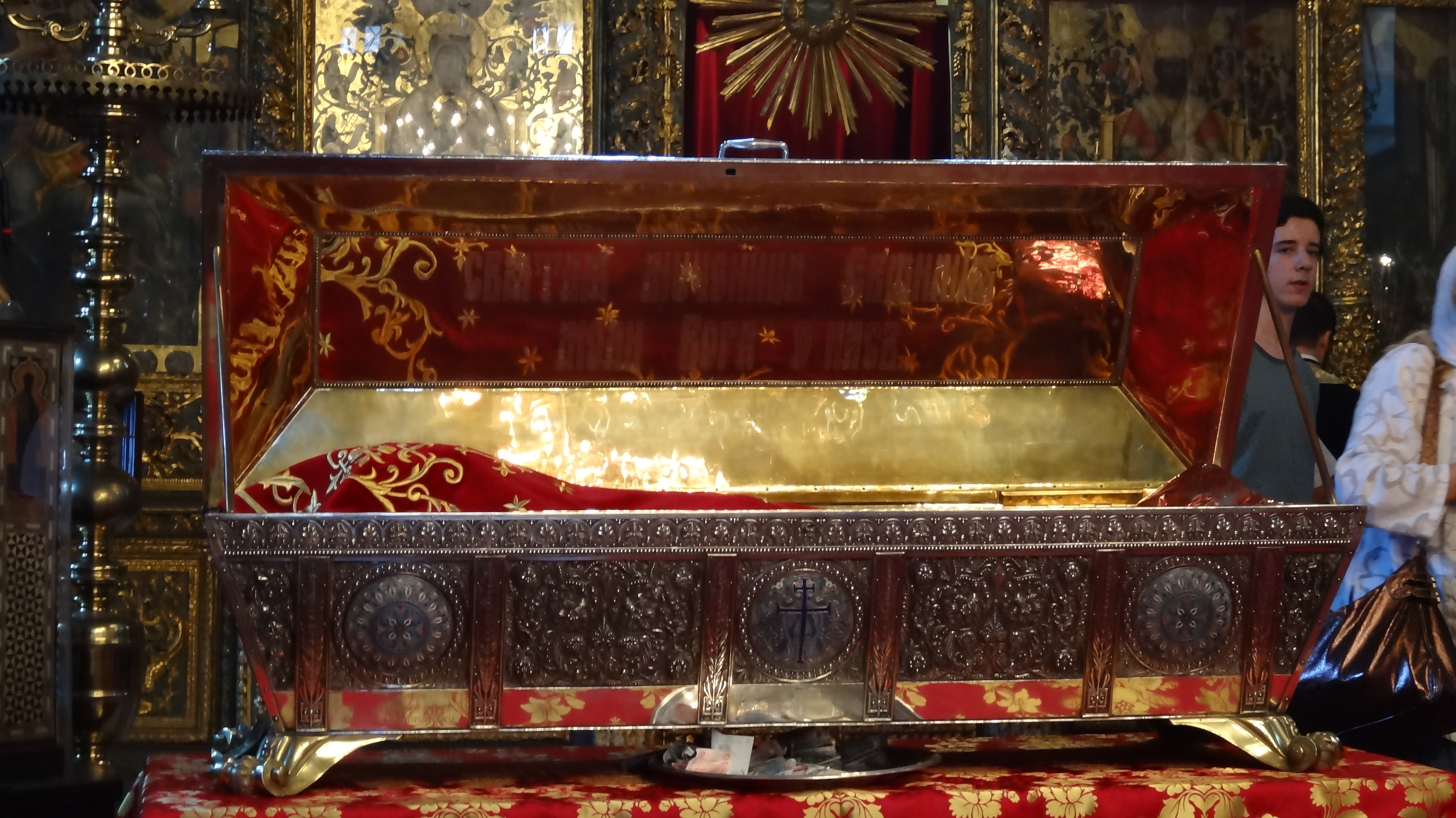
Reliquary of St. Euphemia, Hagios Georgios (Patriarchate) Church, Istanbul.

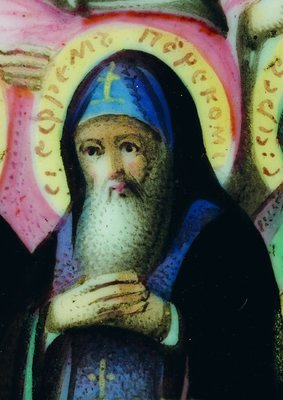
St. Ephraim, Abbot of Perekop, Wonderworker of Novgorod.

== Sources ==
- May 16/29. Orthodox Calendar (PRAVOSLAVIE.RU).
- May 29 / May 16. HOLY TRINITY RUSSIAN ORTHODOX CHURCH (A parish of the Patriarchate of Moscow).
- May 16. Latin Saints of the Orthodox Patriarchate of Rome.
- May 16. The Roman Martyrology.

Greek Sources

- Great Synaxaristes: (in Greek) 16 ΜΑΪΟΥ. ΜΕΓΑΣ ΣΥΝΑΞΑΡΙΣΤΗΣ.
- (in Greek) Συναξαριστής. 16 Μαΐου. ECCLESIA.GR. (H ΕΚΚΛΗΣΙΑ ΤΗΣ ΕΛΛΑΔΟΣ).

Russian Sources

- (in Russian) 29 мая (16 мая). Православная Энциклопедия под редакцией Патриарха Московского и всея Руси Кирилла (электронная версия). (Orthodox Encyclopedia - Pravenc.ru).
- (in Russian) 16 мая (ст.ст.) 29 мая 2013 (нов. ст.). Русская Православная Церковь Отдел внешних церковных связей. (DECR).
