= Phnoum =

4th-century Egyptian Christian monastery

Location
- Location: near Latopolis, Upper Egypt

Architecture
- Type: Monastery
- Founder: Pachomius the Great
- Groundbreaking: 4th century A.D.
- Completed: 4th century A.D.

Phnoum was a cenobitic monastery established by Pachomius the Great during the 4th century A.D. Located near Latopolis in Upper Egypt, it was the southernmost of the nine Pachomian monasteries.

According to the Bohairic Life of Pachomius (58), the construction of the monastery created tensions between the local Egyptian pagans and the Christian monks.
