= Tsmine =

4th-century Egyptian Christian monastery

Location
- Location: modern-day Sohag Governorate, Egypt

Architecture
- Type: Monastery
- Founder: Pachomius the Great
- Groundbreaking: 4th century A.D.
- Completed: 4th century A.D.

Tsmine was a cenobitic monastery established by Pachomius the Great during the 4th century A.D. It was one of the nine Pachomian monasteries.

During Pachomius's lifetime, Petronius served as the superior of Tsmine.
