= Pachomian monasteries =

4th-century Christian monasteries in Egypt

The Pachomian monasteries or the Koinonia of Upper Egypt were a group of Christian cenobitic monasteries founded by Pachomius the Great during the 4th century A.D. Altogether, by the mid-300s A.D., nine Pachomian monasteries formed a network or federation of monasteries known as the Koinonia. All of the nine historical Pachomian monasteries are now defunct.

== History ==
In 329 A.D., Pachomius founded the Koinonia (originally a Greek word from the New Testament meaning 'fellowship'), or network of monasteries, when he established the new monastery of Pbow and moved there from Tabennisi.

== List of monasteries ==
From north to south, the nine monasteries of the Koinonia were Tse, Tkahšmin, Tsmine, Tbew, Tmoušons, Šeneset, Pbow, Tabennesi, and Phnoum. Tse, Tkahšmin, and Tsmine, formed a cluster near Panopolis in the north, while Tbew, Tmoušons, Šeneset, Pbow, and Tabennesi made up the core nucleus of five monasteries near the modern-day town of Nag Hammadi. Phnoum was located much further to the south, near Latopolis. Pachomius also founded two nunneries in Tabennesi and Pbow.

Each monastery was added to the Koinonia (monastic federation) in the following chronological order. Not all monasteries were newly founded or built by Pachomius when they were added to the koinonia; some were pre-existing monasteries.

1. Tabennesi
2. Pbow
3. Šeneset (or Sheneset)
4. Tmoušons (or Thmoushons)
5. Tse
6. Tkahšmin
7. Tbew (or Thbew)
8. Tsmine
9. Phnoum

== Leadership ==
The leadership hierarchy of the Koinonia was as follows.

1. Superior of the Koinonia, or "father" (apa or abba)
2. Superior of the individual monastery, or "steward" (oikonomos). The vice steward, or steward's assistant, is known as the "second" (deuteros).
3. "Housemaster" (oikiakos) of an individual house (oikos) within each monastery. A housemaster also had had an assistant or "second" (deuteros). Each house had around a few dozen monks, while each monastery had a few dozen houses.

Pachomius was the first superior of the Koinonia. After Pachomius's death, Petronius became the superior of the Koinonia for three months until he also died, and was succeeded by Horsiesius. In 350, Horsiesius was succeeded by Theodorus when Horsiesius resigned. Horsiesius again became the superior of the Koinonia when Theodorus died in 368. A timeline of the superiors of the Koinonia is given below.

1. Pachomius (329–9 May 346)
2. Petronius (9 May 346–21 July 346)
3. Horsiesius (21 July 346–350)
4. Theodorus of Tabennese (350–27 April 368)
5. Horsiesius (27 April 368–387)

== Demographics ==
According to John Cassian, there was a total of 5,000 monks in the Pachomian monasteries. Palladius gave a figure of 3,000 monks during Pachomius's time, and 7,000 monks by the end of the 4th century. Ammon gave a figure of 600 monks at Pbow when he resided there in 352 A.D.

== Archaeology ==
Archaeological excavations of Pachomian monasteries have been conducted at Tabennesi, Pbow, and Sheneset-Chenoboskion.

== Manuscripts ==
Various manuscripts have been discovered near the locations of Pachomian monasteries, leading scholars to propose that they were likely part of Pachomian monastic libraries. Tbew, Tmoušons, Šeneset, Pbow, and Tabennesi are all located within a day's walk of each other, and so the texts were likely to have been borrowed and exchanged among the different monasteries.

- Nag Hammadi library
- Dishna Papers
- Barcelona Papyrus
- The Vision of Dorotheus

== See also ==
- Nag Hammadi library
- Kellia
- Coptic monasticism
- Christian monasticism
  - Christian monasticism before 451
  - Cenobitic monasticism
