= Sheneset-Chenoboskion =

al-Qasr wa as-Sayyad القصر و الصياد Chenoboskion
- Location in Egypt
- Coordinates: 26°3′27.39″N 32°18′30.74″E
- Country: Egypt
- Governorate: Qena
- Markaz: Nag Hammadi

Population
  - Total: 13,151
- Time zone: UTC+2 (EET)
  - Summer (DST): UTC+3 (EEST)

al-Qasr wa as-Sayyad (Arabic: القصر و الصياد) is a village in Nag Hammadi district of Qena Governorate, Egypt.

An early center of Christianity in the Thebaid, Roman Egypt, a site frequented by Desert Fathers from the 3rd century and the site of a monastery from the 4th, it was earlier known as Chenoboskion (Greek Χηνοβόσκιον "geese pasture"), also called Chenoboscium /ˌkɛnəˈboʊʃəm/, Chenoboskia (Greek: Χηνοβοσκία, Arabic: شينوبسكيا, romanized: Šinubuskiya) and Sheneset (Coptic: ϣⲉⲛⲉⲥⲏⲧ, romanized: Šénesēt, lit. 'tree(s) of Seth', Arabic: شاناساد, romanized: Šanasad).

The Nag Hammadi library, a collection of 2nd-century Gnostic texts discovered in 1945, was found at Jabal al-Ṭārif in the Nile cliffs to the north-west.

== History ==
E20 N35 G1 V7 N35 W24 Z7 Aa40 N21 Z2 or N35 G1 T23 W24 Z7 X1 O49
nꜣ šnw stḫ or nꜣšnw
in hieroglyphs

At Chenoboskion, St Pachomius was converted to Christianity in the 4th century. Pachomius retreated to this place, having ceased his military activity sometime around 310-315 (the approximate figure given is 314), and converted to Christianity whilst dwelling in the desert. There is a monastery located at Chenoboskion that is dedicated to St Pachomius.

People moved to the region to be near Saint Anthony the Great. A monastic community formed around the saint for the purpose of spiritual guidance, beginning in Pispir and from there moving eastward. The mountainous area east of Pispir is the place of the present Monastery of Saint Anthony. The settlement of Chenoboskion created from this eastward movement began in the Thebaid.

The only remains of masonry consist of a dilapidated quay, amidst whose ruins is a stone bearing a Greek inscription, apparently of the time of Antoninus Pius; from which we learn that the individual, by whose order it was sculptured, had executed some work "at his own expense;" ...

== See also ==
- Antoninus Pius
- Tabenna
- Cenobitic monasticism
- Pachomian monasteries
