= Tse Monastery =

4th-century Egyptian Christian monastery

Tse

Location
- Location: modern-day Sohag Governorate, Egypt

Architecture
- Type: Monastery
- Founder: Pachomius the Great
- Groundbreaking: 4th century A.D.
- Completed: 4th century A.D.

Tse was a cenobitic monastery established by Pachomius the Great during the 4th century A.D. It was one of the nine Pachomian monasteries.

The construction and founding of the monastery was overseen by Pachomius the Great. Pachomius assigned Petronius as the overseer of the monastery.
