= Tbew =

Egyptian Christian monastery

Tbew (also spelled Thbew, Tbewe, or Tbow) was an Egyptian Coptic Orthodox monastery that was established in the mid-4th century. It was one of the Pachomian monasteries.

== History ==
Egypt is known as the birthplace of Christian cenobitic monasticism. Tbew was founded by Petronius, a wealthy Christian and fourth-century monk who briefly succeeded Saint Pachomius as leader of the Koinonia. Petronius is also revered as a saint in the Coptic Church. Tbew would be the seventh monastery to join Pachomius' community of monks (known as the Koinonia). Pachomian monasteries are widely considered to be the first Christian monasteries which regulated the behavior, prayer, and daily lives of its monks. Tbew was the last of the five core monasteries to join the Koinonia along the Nile.

Petronius first gathered men on his family's estate who wanted to spend their lives worshiping Christ. After doing so, Petronius went to Pachomius about turning his estate into a monastery after hearing of Koinonia. The rules at the Pachomian monasteries, including Tbew, were influential on the history of Christian monasticism. The rules were adapted by the anonymous author of the Rule of the Master and influenced the Benedictine Rule.

== Archaeology ==
Although not much is known about the architecture of the monastery, historians hypothesized that it was located within a fertile valley.
