= Hamrah Dom =

- Location in Egypt
- Coordinates: 26°6′N 32°20′E
- Country: Egypt
- Governorate: Qena
- Time zone: UTC+2 (EET)
  - Summer (DST): UTC+3 (EEST)

Hamrah Dom (Arabic: حمرة دوم) is a small village in Upper Egypt. It is situated near the city of Qena, about 80 kilometres north-west of Luxor.

== Overview ==
Located on the west bank of the Nile in the Qena Governorate. It is known for being near the Jabal al-Tarif cliff in which the Gnostic Gospels of the Nag Hammadi library were found by Mohammed Ali Samman in December 1945. Known to have been inhabited by the Hawara tribe at least during the period prior to and including 1945.

== See also ==
- Nag Hammadi library
- Nag Hammâdi
