= Horsiesius =

4th-century Egyptian Christian monk

Saint Horsiesius
- Born: early 4th century AD; Egypt
- Residence: Sheneset
- Died: c. 387; Upper Egypt
- Venerated in: Coptic Orthodox Church
- Influences: Pachomius the Great

Horsiesius (also spelled Horsiesios) was a 4th-century Egyptian Christian monk who served as the head of the Pachomian monasteries from 346 to 350 AD, and again from 368 to 387 AD. He is canonized as a saint by the Coptic Orthodox Church.

== Life ==
Immediately before the death of Pachomius the Great, Horsiesius served as the superior of Sheneset Monastery. After Pachomius's death, Petronius appointed Horsiesius as the superior of the Koinonia until 350, when he resigned and was replaced by Theodorus of Tabennese. When Theodorus died in 368, Horsiesius again became the superior of the Koinonia. Horsesius remained as the superior until his death in 387 or sometime afterwards.

== Writings ==
The Testament of Horsiesius is Horsiesius's best-known work. In 404, Jerome translated the Testament of Horsiesius into Latin (titled Liber Horsiesii). In Coptic, there are also 7 catecheses and 4 letters attributed to Horsiesius.

The Testament of Horsiesius has been translated into English by Armand Veilleux (1982).

Preceded by Petronius	Superior of the Koinonia; 346–350	Succeeded by Theodorus of Tabennese
