= Petronius (disambiguation) =

Petronius (c. AD 27–66) was a Roman courtier during the reign of Nero, and author of the Satyricon.

Petronius may also refer to:

== People ==
- Members of the Petronia gens, an ancient Roman plebeian family
- Gaius Petronius (c. 75 BC – after 20 BC), Prefect of Roman Aegyptus
- Petronius of Egypt, 4th-century Egyptian Christian monk
- Petronius Maximus, Western Roman emperor in 455
- Peter I of Trani (fl. 11th century), first Norman count of Trani

== Other uses ==
- Petronius (horse), a racehorse
- Petronius (oil platform), in the Gulf of Mexico
- Petronius Paperonius, Donald Duck's ancestor, in comics
- Petronius the Arbiter, a cat in Robert A. Heinlein's The Door into Summer
