= Anne Pasquier =

- Born: 1945 (age 80–81)

Academic background
- Education: Université Laval
- Thesis: L'Évangile selon Marie (BG 1): introduction, texte, traduction et commentaire

Academic work
- Discipline: theology
- Institutions: Université Laval
- Main interests: ancient Christian literature
- Notable works: Les textes de Nag Hammadi et le problème de leur classification

Anne Vachon-Pasquier (born in 1945) is a Canadian emeritus professor at the Faculty of Theology and Religious Sciences at Laval University, (Quebec) since 2003. Her teachings and research have had focus on the field of ancient Christianity, particularly in ancient Christian literature.

== Education ==
In 1980 Pasquier earned her PhD at the Université Laval with her thesis L'Évangile selon Marie (BG 1): introduction, texte, traduction et commentaire.

== Contributions ==
Pasquier has taught several courses, has regularly offered seminars on religious rhetoric and literary approaches in Biblical studies, she has contributed to the teaching of several core courses in religious studies and studies programs alumni and attended summer schools. Pasquier produced educational material that is still in use today and has always been concerned with disseminating knowledge to non-university audiences.

She has, among other things, published more than thirty articles and more than a dozen books as an author, scientific editor of ancient texts or editor of collective works. She sits on the editorial boards of several scientific journals and she has edited numerous thematic issues. She has been a member of the Ancient Christianity and Late Antiquity Research Group and the Nag Hammadi Coptic Library Research Group, both of which have received significant grants. She continues to be actively associated with research through her participation in the Nag Hammadi Coptic Text Editing Project, directed by professor Louis Painchaud.

== Some works ==
=== Thesis ===
- Pasquier, Anne (1984). L'Évangile selon Marie (BG 1) : introduction, texte, traduction et commentaire (Thèse (Ph. D.)--Université Laval, 1980). Canadian theses on microfiche = Thèses canadiennes sur microfiche, 60722. Ottawa: Bibliothèque nationale du Canada. ISBN 9780315128118. OCLC 16039528.

=== Books ===
- Pasquier, Anne (1983). L'Evangile selon Marie: (BG 1). Bibliothèque copte de Nag Hammadi., Section "Textes" (in French). Vol. 10. Presses de l'Université Laval. ISBN 9782763769943. OCLC 22380570.
- Painchaud, Louis; Pasquier, Anne (1995). Les textes de Nag Hammadi et le problème de leur classification: actes du colloque tenu à Québec du 15 au 19 septembre 1993. Bibliothèque copte de Nag Hammadi., Section "Etudes" (in French). Vol. 3. Presses de l'Université Laval; Louvain: Peeters. ISBN 9789068317497. OCLC 33942425.
