= Theodorus of Tabennese =

Egyptian Christian monk (c. 314–368)

Saint Theodorus of Tabennese
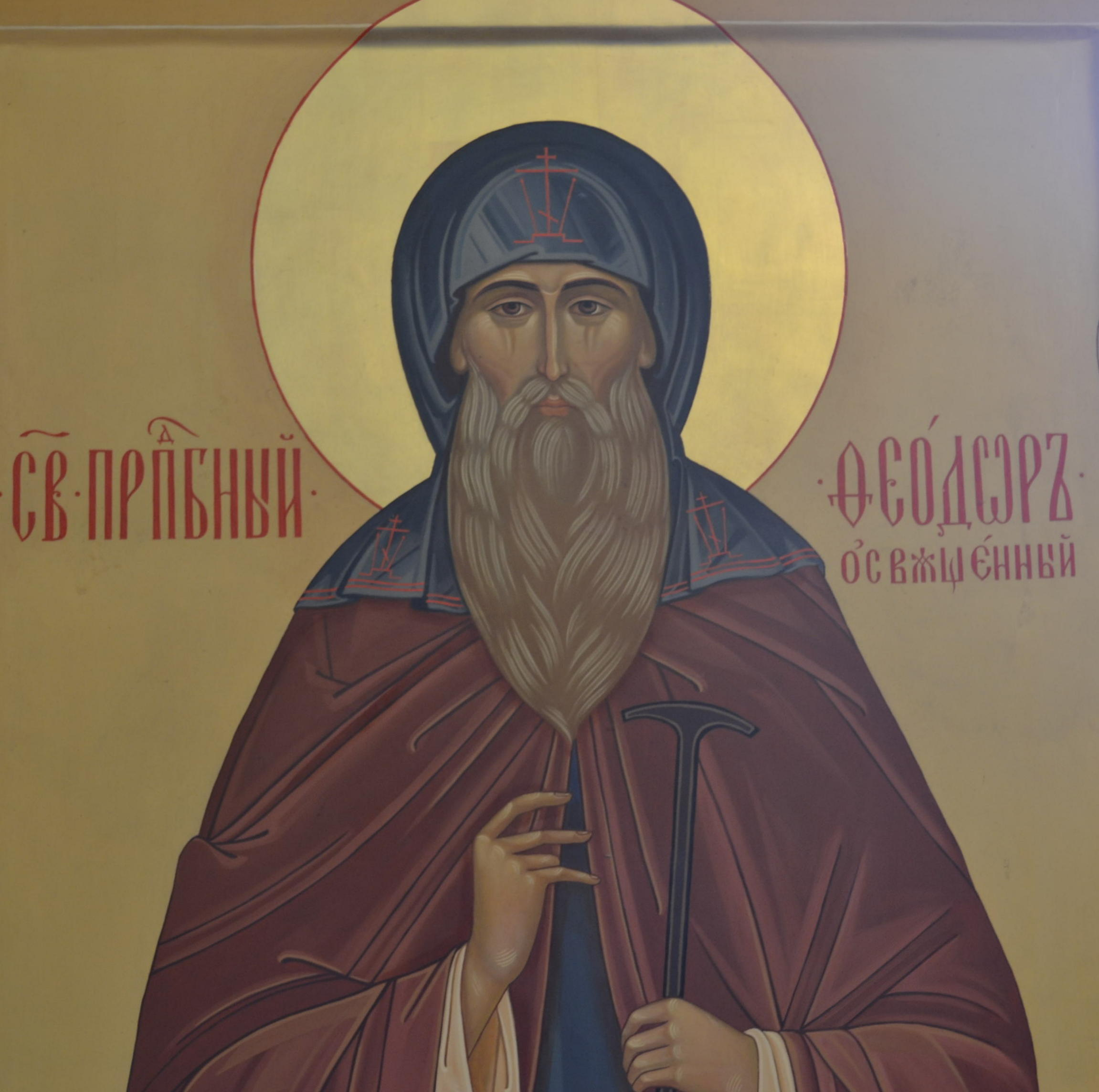
- Icon of St. Theodorus of Tabennese

Star of the Desert
- Born: 314; Esna, Egypt
- Died: 368; Egypt
- Venerated in: Oriental Orthodox Churches; Eastern Orthodox Church; Roman Catholic Church
- Feast: May 16

Theodorus of Tabennese (c. 314 – 368), also known as Abba Theodorus and Theodore the Sanctified, was the spiritual successor to Pachomius and played a crucial role in preventing the first Christian cenobitic monastic federation from collapsing after the death of its founder.

== Biography ==
According to hagiography, Theodorus was born into a wealthy Christian family and was well educated from a young age. Early in life he denied the excesses of his parents, and at the age of fourteen joined a monastery in the diocese of Sne, near the modern town of Esna, Egypt. A brother from Theodorus’ monastery stayed with Pachomius in Tabennese while traveling and preached of the virtues of the Koinonia upon his return to Sne. Praying and weeping, Theodorus became determined that his destiny lay with Pachomius. Although initially denied passage to Tabennese by a Pachomian monk due to his wealthy background, Theodorus opted to follow the visiting monk, and his persistence (and lack of obedience) paid off. He was welcomed by Pachomius upon his arrival, and quickly integrated into the community at Tabennese around 328.

Quickly becoming a favorite of Pachomius, Theodorus lived an enviably ascetic life in the monastery, and took on the title of the "brothers’ comforter". Theodorus asserted his influence openly (which resulted in reprimands from Pachomius) and generally maintained himself as a prominent figure at Tabennese for several years, despite never being given a position of power in the monastic hierarchy. Finally, Pachomius called on him to preach to the brothers despite his youth, and eventually appointed him steward of Tabennese after several new monasteries had been built. Retiring to the monastery of Phbow, Pachomius gave Theodorus complete control over Tabennese, though recalled him from the position after witnessing several monks under Theodorus’ watch violating the monastic rules without reprimand. Having failed to prove his governing ability and once more in a position no higher than when he had entered the monastery, Theodorus became a personal assistant to Pachomius and remained relatively quiet for some years. Despite his clear potential and popularity, Pachomius refused to grant Theodorus any kind of authority; though the old man's failing health soon changed things forever.

After Theodorus had been assisting Pachomius at Tabennese for several years following his demotion, Pachomius became very ill and seemed to be on the verge of death. Pachomius had not named a successor, and several brothers pleaded with Theodorus to assert himself as head of the Koinonia when the sickly man died. Despite the assertion that Theodorus apparently did not want the rank of a father or this world's glory, he consented. Unfortunately for the would-be leader, Pachomius recovered, and upon hearing of Theodorus’ decision, exiled the ambitious young man. After living a life of constant weeping and prayer in solitude, Pachomius forgave Theodorus and allowed him to live among the brothers once more. Normalcy returned, though never again would Pachomius fully trust his former protégé.

In 348 Pachomius died, naming the brother Petronios as his successor rather than the clearly qualified Theodorus. The death of Petronios later that year would leave Apa Horsiesios in charge, and the popular Theodorus would retreat to the distant monastery of Phnoum. Although it seems Theodorus practiced complete submission to the new leader of the Koinonia, problems soon arose in several Pachomian monasteries that viewed Horsiesios as a weak leader. Refusing to work or communicate and demanding a new leader, many of the elder monks completely abandoned any notion of obedience to Horsiesios. The federation of monasteries was falling apart, and Theodorus rushed to Tabennese to placate the rebels. Soon after his arrival, Theodorus was the new de facto leader, though he claimed to be only acting on behalf of Horsiesios. For eighteen years Theodorus administered from Pachomius’ old headquarters in Phbow, using techniques far more assertive than his predecessors, such as constantly shuffling the offices and locations of the most ambitious monks. Yet in spite of this somewhat unstable shifting, the Koinonia was ruled peacefully for nearly two decades, at which point Theodorus predicted he would soon die. Within a few months his prediction came true, and Apa Horsiesios once more took his place as the head of the communities in both title and authority.

== Literature ==
=== Personal writings ===
Like those of Pachomius and the other leaders of the Koinonia, Theodorus’ sermons were recorded by his followers and some chronicles of his correspondence with contemporary Christian figures have survived intact. The most substantial of these documents, which are in Coptic and believed to have come from Theodorus' hand, is a set of three instructions. These instructions consist of several small lessons and rules, which Theodorus presumably taught to the brothers, and while segments of each are incomprehensible because the original texts are mutilated and the reconstruction is conjectural, many segments remain intact. A variety of subjects are covered in these texts, though few passages offer any insight beyond the well-known facts that Theodorus greatly admired Pachomius and endorsed a very ascetic lifestyle for the brothers whom he guided. Scripture is cited liberally, though there is ultimately little to distinguish these texts from the writings of other early Christians under the Alexandrian sphere of influence. The same can be said for the two short letters Theodorus composed to the other monasteries of the federation that he inherited from Pachomius, which deal with the topics of Passover and vigilance against sin. Certainly these texts all offer insight into the values of the Pachomian monastic system as a whole and early Christianity itself, but little is intrinsically evident about the man who penned them.

=== The letter of Ammon ===
The letter of Ammon is the only firsthand description of what it was like to be within a monastery during the time in which Theodorus was in charge of the Koinonia. Ammon spent three years living with Theodorus in the monastery of Phbow, which served as the headquarters of the Koinonia starting when Pachomius relocated there around 336. Most of the letter consists of sayings Ammon heard from brothers who had personally interacted with Pachomius and Theodorus, much of which is praise for the two men with little real substance. Although Ammon was a diligent man who would later become a well-known bishop, his knowledge of the workings of the Koinonia was limited by his inability to understand Coptic. Pachomius and Theodorus were native Egyptians, and spoke the native Egyptian language known as Sahidic Coptic, as did a vast majority of the brothers who came to them. However, individuals who spoke other languages began to be accepted after Athanasius referred a Greek convert who had served him in Alexandria to Pachomius. This Greek man, who was known as Theodorus the Alexandrian, sought an ascetic life, and quickly impressed Pachomius with his piety. Although Pachomius was unable to easily communicate with him, he appointed this new Theodorus as the housemaster for the strangers who were also coming to become monks with him in Phbow, and gave him full authority over those who spoke Greek. Theodorus the Alexandrian eventually learned Coptic and was able to communicate with Pachomius and serve as the official translator of the Koinonia, but the community he administered always remained semi-autonomous from the main population of the monastery. Greek monks were forced to rely on Theodorus to communicate with anyone outside their small circle, and a distinct language barrier manifested itself. As the sources indicate, Ammon and the brothers he interacted with were on the side of this barrier opposite Theodorus.

All accounts of Theodorus’ sayings reported in Ammon's letters are described only as they were translated to him. Ammon acknowledges that when Theodorus spoke to him, he did so in the Egyptian language, while Theodorus the Alexandrian translated into Greek, and that all his communications were thus indirect. It was a burden for Ammon to ask Theodorus questions, since both the inquiry and response had to pass through Theodorus the Alexandrian, and as such most of his descriptions involve observable actions rather than speech. Furthermore, the stories and miracles he chronicles hearing from his brothers could not have come directly to them from an Egyptian brother, and must have filtered to them through Theodorus the Alexandrian. Since little is known or recorded about the intention of the Greek Theodorus, it is impossible to judge how his position as head translator may have affected information received by the community he headed, or how accurately they understood the words of Pachomius and the Egyptian Theodorus.

=== The monastic chronicle ===
The monastic chronicle of the Pachomian federation is by far the most detailed source that mentions Theodorus. The chronicle was completed sometime after the deaths of Pachomius and Theodorus, who are presented as the two centermost figures in the history of the Koinonia. Versions of this chronicle has been found in several different translations and pieced together from fragments but the Bohairic version has become the most frequently consulted. This is because it is by far the most detailed and comprehensible version, and written in a language more similar to the Sahidic Coptic spoken by most Pachomian monks than the Greek version. It can be estimated that the chronicle composed sometime between 368, when the last of the recorded events is believed to have transpired, and 404, when Saint Jerome is known to have translated a version of the chronicles into Latin. Many questions remain about the origins of this text, but since it is the only substantial biography about Theodorus, it remains a fundamental source.

== See also ==
- Pachomius the Great
- Horsiesius
- Desert Fathers
- Coptic saints
- Coptic monasticism
