= Tabenna =

Early Christian community in Egypt

Coordinates: 26°3′35″N 32°18′00″E

Tabenna is a Christian community founded in Upper Egypt around 320 by Saint Pachomius. It was the motherhouse of a federation of monasteries known as the Koinonia. At the time of Pachomius's death in 346, there were nine establishments for men and two for women, along with two or three thousand "Tabennesites". It is considered the first major model of cenobitic monasticism in early Christianity.

== Name and location ==
Tabenna (also Tabennae, Tabennisi, Tabennesi, Tabennese) is a Coptic name. The name and location of this monastery have long been the subject of great uncertainty. In the various manuscripts of the Lausiac History of Palladios (§ 32), the following Greek forms are found: Ταβέννησις, Ταβέννησος, Ταβενίσιος and Ταβένη. In Sozomene (III, 14), one manuscript gives (correctly) "έν Ταβεννήσῳ", but another incorrectly reads "έν Ταβέννη νήσῳ" in two words (with the word νῆσος, "island"). It is apparently this cacography that inspired Nikephoros Kallistos Xanthopoulos' (fl. 14th century) phrase: "ἔν τινι νήσῳ, ἣ Ταβέννη ώνόμαστο", "in a certain island called Tabenne". Hence comes the tradition according to which the monastery was installed on an island, which in fact does not appear in any ancient document. In Coptic manuscripts, the forms are as follows: Tabennêsi (the most frequent), Tabênise, Tabnêse, Tabsinêse, Tabsênisi and others. In the Arabic texts: Tabanessin, Tafnis, Tafânis, Tafnasa, and also Dounasa are found. In Latin, the form Tabennen is found in the Latin Life of Pachomius by Dionysius Exiguus. As for the derivative designating the occupants of the place, in Greek it takes the forms Ταβεννησιώτης, Ταβινισιώτης, Ταβισιώτης; in Latin Tabennensis (with the usual suffix -ensis), Tabennesiota (tracing from Greek), Tabennensiota (mixture of the two).

== History ==
Starting as an abandoned village along the Nile river, the monastery at Tabennese is considered to be the first cenobitic monastery and is credited with sparking the Pachomian monastic movement. One day while collecting wood at this village, it is said that Pachomius was shown a vision that told him to build a monastery at this location. The monks at Tabennese first built a church for the village itself. As the village grew, they went on to build a church for themselves. This all began as a sort of communal experiment that quickly became overpopulated. Not only would the monastery go on to be formed there, but it also turned into a sprawling village that was separate from the monastery itself. Although sprawling, it rarely attracted the visitation of pilgrims as it was so remote. Regardless of this, it did not fail to draw the attention of local authorities. There are records of Tabennese taxation from the Hermopolite nome that were dated 367 A.D. Although Tabennese was located within the Tentyrite nome, the Hermopolite nome, which was a considerable distance away, was responsible for taxation of its land.

In the fall of 329, the monks were visited by the new archbishop Athanasius of Alexandria, who ordained Pachomius as a priest. Shortly after, a second establishment was founded in the neighboring village, also abandoned, of Pbow. Pachomius himself settled there c. 336-37, and Pbow became the most important settlement with 600 monks at the time of the death of the founder in 346. After 340, other monasteries were established between Esna and Akhmim. The whole constituted a real order, with a superior general at its head who circulates between the monasteries and appoints their superiors. A gathering of all the monks took place twice a year, at Easter and August 13th, in the mother house of Tabennêsis; on this occasion, superiors ought to report on their material management to the general bursar.

After the death of Pachomius on May 9th 346, the superior general was Petronius, but died three months later. Orsisius replaced him, but in 351, following the revolt of a monastery, Theodorus of Tabennese, one of the first disciples of Pachomius, had to take things in hand, and he ensured the direction until his death in 368, while calling himself the "vicar" of Orsisius. At that date there were twelve men's monasteries and three women's monasteries. Orsisius then resumed his functions until his death after 386. In 390, Archbishop Theophilus I of Alexandria favored the installation of a monastery of the order at Canopus to the east of Alexandria, on the site of an ancient temple of Serapis. The monastery of Metanoia, which had Latin monks, played an important role in the influence exercised by its rule in the West. Around the year 400, according to Palladios, the "Tabennesites" or Pachomians numbered around 7,000. In the 5th century, the order accepted the decisions of the Council of Chalcedon, and it only experienced divisions on this subject from the 6th century.

== Archaeology ==
More recent archaeological efforts have placed the ancient monastery on the edge of the modern-day village of Faw Qibli.

== See also ==
- Pachomian monasteries
- Theodorus of Tabennese
