= Jabal al-Ṭārif =

Archaeological site with caves in the cliffs along the Nile,

Coordinates: 26.1286°N 32.21599°E

Jabal al-Ṭārif is an archaeological site in the cliffs along the Nile, located in Egypt's Qena Governorate (before 2013 in the Red Sea Governorate), about 5 km north of Nag Hammadi, and about the same distance west of Hamrah Dawm.

It is the location where the Nag Hammadi library writings were found in 1945 by tribesmen known as Mohammed Ali and Abu al-Maid (sons of Ali Khalifa), belonging to a clan named al-Samman.

It is also the site of caves containing ancient Egyptian tombs.

The site was occupied by hermits and traces of them are still observed there.

It has been painted by Jacques Majorelle in April 1914.
