= Pbow =

Historical monastery in Egypt

Basilica of Saint Pachomius

Location
- Location: Faw al-Qibli, Egypt
- Interactive map of Basilica of Saint Pachomius
- Coordinates: 26.112500°N 32.403056°E

Architecture
- Type: Monastery
- Founder: Pachomius the Great
- Groundbreaking: 336
- Completed: 337
- Demolished: c. 1000 AD

Pbow was a cenobitic monastery established by St. Pachomius in 336-337 AD. Pbow is about 100 km (62 miles) north of Luxor in modern Upper Egypt. It was one of the nine Pachomian monasteries.

== Name ==
Pbow is a Coptic name. The Arabic "Faw" in "Faw al-Qibli" ("South Faw") derives from the Coptic Pbow. Other spellings include "Bau", "Pboou", and "Phbow".

== History ==
Pbow was founded as an administrative center for Pachomius's monastery in 336–337. Although not much is known about the traditions of these monks, we do know that they would annually meet two times a year at Pbow. Catechumens would often be baptized at this monastery on Easter. Pbow would also go on to become the residence of Pachomius prior to his death. The center included the Basilica of St. Pachomius. Pachomius died in Pbow in 347.

Very little is known about the history of Pbow after the 6th century AD. Around the time of the reign of al-Hakim, Pbow was either destroyed by al-Hakim, or it was already ruined.

== Archaeology ==
The first descriptions of Pbow by Western archaeologists were from B.T.A. Evetts, Alfred J. Butler, Michel Jullien, and Louis Massignon, around the late 19th century and early 20th century. Louis-Théophile Lefort described Pbow in Les premiers monastères Pachômiens, published 1939.

Pbow was somewhat recently discovered buried underneath two newer churches in 1989. According to William Harmless, it was about twenty-four meters wide and forty-one meters long. This church included a section known as an apse, presumably meant for meetings of monks from affiliated monasteries. Outside communal buildings for monks were further discovered on the grounds of the once standing monastery.

Peter Grossmann has been a primary investigator of the archaeology of Pbow, starting in the 1970s. According to Grossmann, three different primary churches were built at Pbow over time, superimposed one over the other.
