= Nag Hammadi =

City in Qena, Egypt

Nag Hammadi نجع حمادي
- City
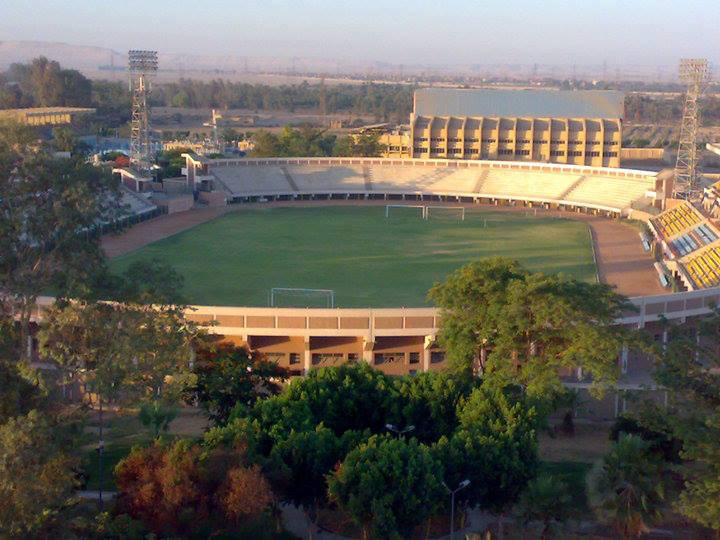
- Aluminium Stadium in Nag Hammadi

- Location in Egypt
- Coordinates: 26°03′N 32°15′E
- Country: Egypt
- Governorate: Qena

Area
  - Total: 103.9 sq mi (269.2 km^{2})

Population (2023)
  - Total: 660,690
  - Urban: 61,737
  - Rural: 598,953
- Time zone: UTC+2 (EET)
  - Summer (DST): UTC+3 (EEST)

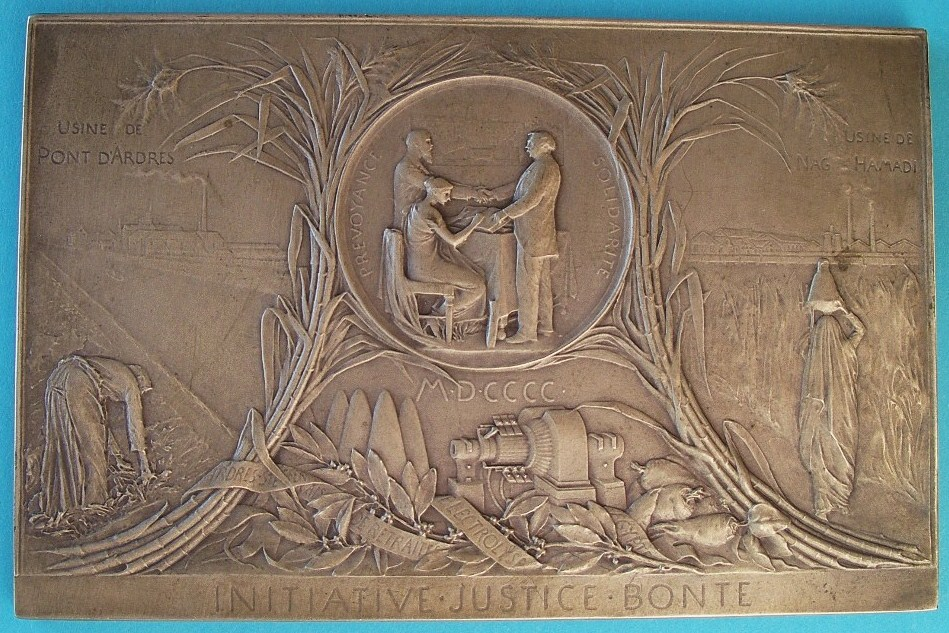
Plaque of a local sugar refinery that mentions French town Ardres, 1901

Nag Hammadi (/ˌnɑːɡ həˈmɑːdi/ NAHG hə-MAH-dee; Arabic: نجع حمادى Nagʿ Ḥammādī) is a city and markaz in Upper Egypt. It is located on the west bank of the Nile in the Qena Governorate, about 80 kilometres (50 mi) north-west of Luxor. The city had a population of close to 61,737 as of 2023. It was made famous in 1945 for the "Nag Hammadi library," an important collection of ancient texts found nearby.

== History ==
The town of Nag Hammadi was found on the site of older villages Ansan (Arabic: انسان) and al-Luaqi (Arabic: اللواقي) in the 19th century and was named after its founder, Mahmoud Pasha Hammadi, a member of the Hammadi family in Sohag, Egypt. Mahmoud Pasha Hammadi was a major landholder in Sohag, and known for his strong opposition to the British rule in Egypt beginning in 1882.

In the city of Nag Hammadi, there is the palace of Prince Youssef Kamal, a member of the royal family (the family of Muhammad Ali Pasha), which overlooks the Nile River and is now an archaeological site.

Nag Hammadi is about 5 kilometres (3.1 mi) west of ancient site of Chenoboskion (Ancient Greek: Χηνοβόσκιον). The "Nag Hammadi library", an important collection of 2nd-century Gnostic texts, was found at Jabal al-Ṭārif near Nag Hammadi in 1945.

The city was the site of the Nag Hammadi Massacre in January 2010, in which eight Coptic Christians were shot dead by three men. In total, nineteen Coptic Christians were attacked.

== Economy ==
Sugar and aluminium are produced in Nag Hammadi. The Nag Hammadi Sugar factory was built in 1895–1897 by French contractors Cail and Fives. It is still in operation in 2018. Egyptalum is one of the largest aluminium producers in the Middle East. Wood particleboard is manufactured from sugar cane bagasse.

== See also ==
- List of cities and towns in Egypt
