= Petronius of Egypt =

4th-century Egyptian Christian monk

Saint Petronius
- Born: c. late 3rd century AD; Egypt
- Residence: Tbew
- Died: 346; Upper Egypt
- Venerated in: Coptic Orthodox Church
- Feast: 27 Abib
- Influences: Pachomius the Great

Petronius, also spelled Petronios (died 346 AD), was a 4th-century Egyptian Christian monk who served as a superior of the Pachomian monasteries.

== Life ==
Petronius was born into a wealthy family in Pjoj, a town located in the diocese of Diospolis Parva (also known as Hu or Hiw). He built the monastery of Tbew by converting his family estate into a monastery. Soon afterwards, his father, Pshenthbo, and his brother, Pshenapalhi, and other relatives converted to Christianity and joined the local Pachomian monasteries as monks. He later requested Pachomius to allow Tbew to join the Koinonia, which was Pachomius's federation of monasteries.

During Pachomius's lifetime, Petronius served as the superior of Tsmine and also oversaw other monasteries, including Šmin and Tse. Pachomius appointed Petronius as his successor when he was on his deathbed.

== Death and legacy ==
Petronius died on 21 July 346, three months after Pachomius the Great died, and was succeeded by Horsiesius. Today, Petronius is canonized as a saint by the Coptic Orthodox Church. His Coptic calendar feast day is on 27 Abib.

Preceded by Pachomius	Superior of the Koinonia; 346	Succeeded by Horsiesius
