= Cenobitic monasticism =

Monastic tradition that stresses community life

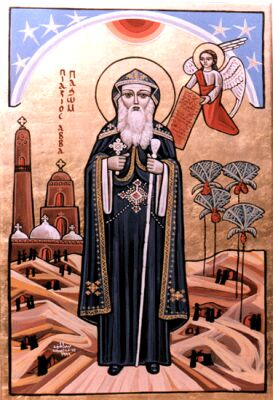
Coptic icon of Pachomius the Great, the founder of Christian cenobitic monasticism

Cenobitic (or coenobitic) monasticism is a monastic tradition that stresses community life. Often in the West the community belongs to a religious order, and the life of the cenobitic monk is regulated by a religious rule, a collection of precepts. It is one of several forms of monasticism, distinguished from the eremitic life of a hermit, or the skete and lavritic forms developed in Eastern Christianity.

The English words cenobite and cenobitic are derived, via Latin, from the Greek words koinos (κοινός, lit. 'common'), and bios (βίος, lit. 'life'). The adjective can also be cenobiac (κοινοβιακός, koinoviakos) or cœnobitic (obsolete). A group of monks living in community is often referred to as a cenobium (Latin, from Greek koinobion). Cenobitic monasticism appears in several religious traditions, though most commonly in Buddhism and Christianity.

== Origins ==
The word cenobites was initially applied to the followers of Pythagoras in Crotone, Italy, who founded a commune not just for philosophical study but also for the "amicable sharing of worldly goods."

== Judaic monasticism ==
In the 1st century AD, the Jewish philosopher Philo of Alexandria (c. 25 BC – c. 50 AD) describes a Jewish ascetic community of men and women on the shores of Lake Mareotis in the vicinity of Alexandria, Egypt which he calls the Therapeutae. Members of this Jewish community lived apart from one another during six days of the week, studying the Hebrew Bible during the daytime and eating during the evening, whereafter on the Sabbath they hoped to dream visions informed by their studies. They composed books of midrash, an allegorical method of interpreting Jewish scripture, including the Tanakh. Only on the Sabbath would the Therapeutae meet, share their learning, eat a common, albeit simple, meal of bread and spring water, and listen to a lecture on the Torah given by one of the venerable members of their community. Every seventh Sabbath, or High Sabbath, was accorded a festival of learning and singing, which culminated in an egalitarian dance.

The 3rd-century Christian writer Eusebius of Caesarea (c. 263–339), in his Ecclesiastical History, identified Philo's Therapeutae as the first Christian monks, identifying their renunciation of property, chastity, fasting, and solitary lives with the cenobitic ideal of the Christian monks.

== Christian monasticism ==
The organized version of Christian cenobitic monasticism is commonly thought to have started in Egypt in the 4th century AD. Christian monks of previous centuries were usually hermits, especially in the Middle East; this continued to be very common until the decline of Aramean Christianity in the Late Middle Ages. This form of solitary living, however, did not suit everyone. Some monks found the eremitic style to be too lonely and difficult; and if one was not spiritually prepared, the life could lead to mental breakdowns.

For this reason, organized monastic communities were established so that monks could have more support in their spiritual struggle. While eremitic monks did have an element of socializing, since they would meet once a week to pray together, cenobitic monks came together for common prayer on a more regular basis. The cenobitic monks also practised more socializing because the monasteries where they lived were often located in or near inhabited villages. For example, the Bohairic version of Dionysius Exiguus' The Life of Saint Pachomius states that the monks of the monastery of Tabenna built a church for the villagers of the nearby town of the same name even "before they constructed one for themselves." This means that cenobitic monks did find themselves in contact with other people, including lay people, whereas the eremitic monks tried to keep to themselves, only meeting for prayer occasionally.

== Saint Pachomius ==
Cenobitic monks were also different from their eremitic predecessors and counterparts in their living arrangements. Whereas eremitic monks (hermits) lived alone in a monastery consisting of merely a hut or cave (cell), cenobitic monks lived together in monasteries comprising one or a complex of several buildings. In the latter case, each dwelling would house about twenty monks, and within the house there were separate rooms or cells that would be inhabited by two or three monks. To early generations of historians, the style of housing maintained by cenobitic monks was attributed to the man usually hailed the "father of cenobitic monasticism," Saint Pachomius, who was believed to have found the idea for such quarters during the time he spent in the Roman army, as the style was "reminiscent of army barracks." While this impression may have been to some extent mythologized by the bishop and historian Palladius of Galatia, communal barracks-like desert dwellings known as cenobia came to exist around the early 4th century.

Though Pachomius is often credited as the "father of cenobitic monasticism," it is more accurate to think of him as the "father of organized cenobitic monasticism", as he was the first monk to take smaller communal groups that often already existed and bring them together into a federation of monasteries. He continued this work until his death in 347 at Pbow, a monastic center that he had founded ten years before.

Palladius' Lausiac History claims that Pachomius was given the idea to start a cenobitic monastery from an angel. Though this is an explanation of his reasoning for initiating the cenobitic tradition, there are sources that indicate there were already other communal monastic groups around at that time and possibly before him. Three of the nine monasteries that joined Pachomius' federation "clearly had an independent origin", meaning he was not the first to have such an idea.

== Melitians and Manichaeans ==
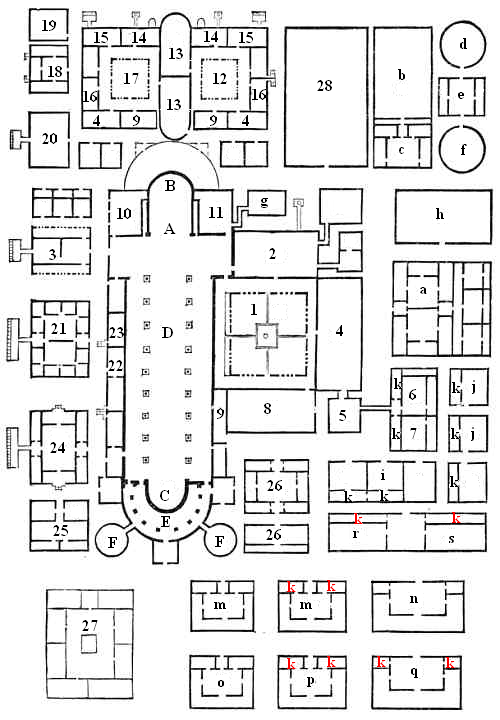
The ground plan of the monastery of St. Gall in Switzerland, providing for all of the monks' needs within the monastery walls

Besides the monasteries that joined Pachomius' federation of cenobitic monasteries, there were both Christian and non-Christian cenobitic groups who decided not to join him, such as the Melitians and Manichaeans.

Before Pachomius had begun organizing monastic communities, the Melitians as a group were already recruiting members. They were a heretical Christian sect founded by Melitius of Lycopolis. They "heard of Pachomius' monastic aspirations and tried to recruit him" to join their community.

Some scholars believe the Manichaeans, founded by Mani, were the "pioneers of communal asceticism in Egypt," rather than Pachomius. Mani himself was influenced to begin cenobitic monasticism from other groups, including Buddhists and Jewish-Christian Elkasites.

== Later cenobitic communities ==
The cenobitic monastic idea did not end with these early groups, and inspired future groups and individuals:

- Mar Awgin founded a monastery on Mount Izla above Nisibis in Mesopotamia (c. 350), and from this monastery the cenobitic tradition spread in Mesopotamia, Persia, Armenia, Georgia, India and China.
- St. Basil of Caesarea founded a monastery at Annesi, Pontus (c. 364) after witnessing the Egyptian monasteries. The Rule of St Basil would go on to become the standard monastic rule in the Eastern Orthodox Church.
- Mar Saba organized the monks of the Judaean Desert in a monastery close to Bethlehem in 483, which is considered the mother of all monasteries of the Eastern Orthodox churches.
- St. Benedict of Nursia founded the monastery of Monte Cassino in Italy (529), which was the seed of Roman Catholic monasticism in general, and of the order of Benedict in particular.
- St. Bruno of Carthusia, prompted by the spectre of the damnation of the Good Doctor of Paris Cenodoxus, founded a monastery just outside Paris in the 11th century.

In both the East and the West, cenobiticism established itself as the primary form of monasticism, with many foundations being richly endowed by rulers and nobles. The excessive acquisition of wealth and property led to several attempts at reform, such as Bernard of Clairvaux in the West and Nilus of Sora in the East.

== See also ==
- Hermitage
- Lavra
