= Pachomius the Great =

Egyptian saint

Saint Pachomius the Great
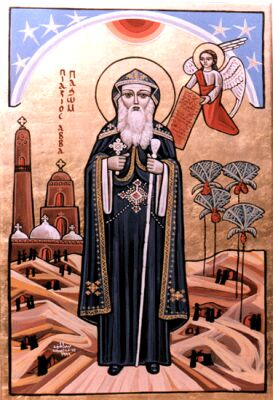
- Father of Spiritual Communal Monastic Life

Founder
- Born: c. 287; Thebaid, Roman Egypt (near modern-day Luxor, Egypt)
- Died: 9 May 348; Pbow, Roman Egypt (modern-day Faw al-Qibli, Egypt)
- Venerated in: Catholic Church; Anglicanism; Eastern Orthodox Church; Oriental Orthodox Churches; Lutheranism
- Major shrine: Monastery of Saint Pachomius (Luxor), Egypt
- Feast: 9 May; 14 Pashons (Coptic Orthodox); 15 May (Catholic Benedictines, Eastern Orthodox, Anglican)
- Attributes: Hermit in a garb, Hermit crossing the Nile on the back of a crocodile

Pachomius (/pəˈkoʊmiəs/; Greek: Παχώμιος Pakhomios; Coptic: Ⲡⲁϧⲱⲙ; c. 287 – 9 May 348 AD), also known as Saint Pachomius the Great, was an Egyptian saint who is generally recognized as the founder of Christian cenobitic monasticism. In the Vita Pachumii, his name is recorded as Pachumius (Παχούμιος). Coptic churches celebrate his feast day on 9 May, and Eastern Orthodox and Catholic churches mark his feast on 15 May or 28 May. In Lutheranism, he is remembered as a renewer of the church, along with his contemporary (and fellow desert saint), Anthony of Egypt on 17 January.

== Name ==
The name Pachomius is of Coptic origin: ⲡⲁϧⲱⲙ pakhōm from ⲁϧⲱⲙ akhōm "eagle or falcon" (ⲡ p- at the beginning is the Coptic definite article), from Middle Egyptian ꜥẖm "falcon", originally "divine image". Into Greek, it was adopted as Παχούμιος and Παχώμιος. By Greek folk etymology, it was sometimes interpreted as "broad-shouldered" from παχύς "thick, large" and ὦμος "shoulder".

== Life ==
Pachomius was born in c. 292 in Thebaid (near modern-day Luxor, Egypt) to pagan parents. According to his hagiography, at age 21, Pachomius was swept up against his will in a Roman army recruitment drive, a common occurrence during this period of turmoil and civil war. With several other youths, he was put onto a ship that floated down the Nile and arrived at Thebes in the evening. Here he first encountered local Christians, who customarily brought food and comfort daily to the conscripted troops. This made a lasting impression, and Pachomius vowed to investigate Christianity further when he got out. He was able to leave the army without ever having to fight. He moved to the village of Sheneset (Chenoboskion) in Upper Egypt and was converted and baptized in 314.

Pachomius then came into contact with several well known ascetics and decided to pursue that path under the guidance of the hermit named Palaemon (317). One of his devotions, popular at the time, was praying with his arms stretched out in the form of a cross. After studying seven years with Palaemon, Pachomius set out to lead the life of a hermit near St. Anthony of Egypt, whose practices he imitated until Pachomius heard a voice in Tabennisi that told him to build a dwelling for the hermits to come to. An earlier ascetic named Macarius had created a number of proto-monasteries called lavra, or cells, where holy men who were physically or mentally unable to achieve the rigors of Anthony's solitary life would live in a community setting. According to the Bohairic Life of Pachomius (17), while Pachomius was praying at the deserted village of Tabennisi, he heard a voice calling him, saying, "Pachomius, Pachomius, struggle, dwell in this place and build a monastery; for many will come to you to become monks with you, and they will profit their souls." Later, while praying at night after a day of harvesting reeds with his brother on a small island, Pachomius had another vision of an angel saying to him three times, "Pachomius, Pachomius, the Lord's will is [for you] to minister to the race of men and to unite them to himself" (Bohairic Life of Pachomius 22).

Pachomius established his first monastery between 318 and 323 at Tabennisi, Egypt. His elder brother John joined him, and soon more than 100 monks lived nearby. Pachomius set about organizing these cells into a formal organization. Until then, Christian asceticism had been solitary or eremitic with male or female monastics living in individual huts or caves and meeting only for occasional worship services. Pachomius created the community or cenobitic organization, in which male or female monastics lived together and held their property in common under the leadership of an abbot or abbess. Pachomius realized that some men, acquainted only with the eremitical life, might speedily become disgusted if the distracting cares of the cenobitical life were thrust too abruptly upon them. He therefore allowed them to devote their whole time to spiritual exercises, undertaking all the community's administrative tasks himself. The community hailed Pachomius as "Abba" ("father" in Aramaic), from which "Abbot" derives. The monastery at Tabennisi, though enlarged several times, soon became too small and a second was founded at Pbow. This monastery at Pbow would go on to become the center for monasteries springing up along the Nile in Upper Egypt. Both of these are believed to have initially been abandoned villages, which were then repurposed for Pachomius’ vision of his Koinonia (network of monasteries). After 336, Pachomius spent most of his time at Pbow. Though Pachomius sometimes acted as lector for nearby shepherds, neither he nor any of his monks became priests. St. Athanasius visited and wished to ordain him in 333, but Pachomius fled from him. Athanasius' visit was probably a result of Pachomius' zealous defence of orthodoxy against Arianism. Basil of Caesarea visited, then took many of Pachomius' ideas, which he adapted and implemented in Caesarea. This ascetic rule, or Ascetica, is still used today by the Eastern Orthodox Church, comparable to that of the Rule of St. Benedict in the West.

== Rule of St. Pachomius ==
Pachomius was the first to set down a written monastic rule. The first rule was composed of prayers generally known and in general use, such as the Lord's Prayer. The monks were to pray them every day. As the community developed, the rules were elaborated with precepts taken from the Bible. He drew up a rule which made things easier for the less proficient, but did not check the most extreme asceticism in the more proficient. The Rule sought to balance prayer with work, the communal life with solitude. The day was organised around the liturgy, with time for manual work and devotional reading.

Fasts and work were apportioned according to the individual's strength. Each monk received the same food and clothing. Common meals were provided, but those who wished to absent themselves from them were encouraged to do so, and bread, salt, and water were placed in their cells. In the Pachomian monasteries it was left very much to the individual taste of each monk to fix the order of life for himself. Thus the hours for meals and the extent of his fasting were settled by him alone, he might eat with the others in common or have bread and salt provided in his own cell every day or every second day.

His rule was translated into Latin by Jerome. Honoratus of Lérins followed the Rule of St. Pachomius. Basil the Great and Benedict of Nursia adapted and incorporated parts of it in their rules.

== Death and legacy ==
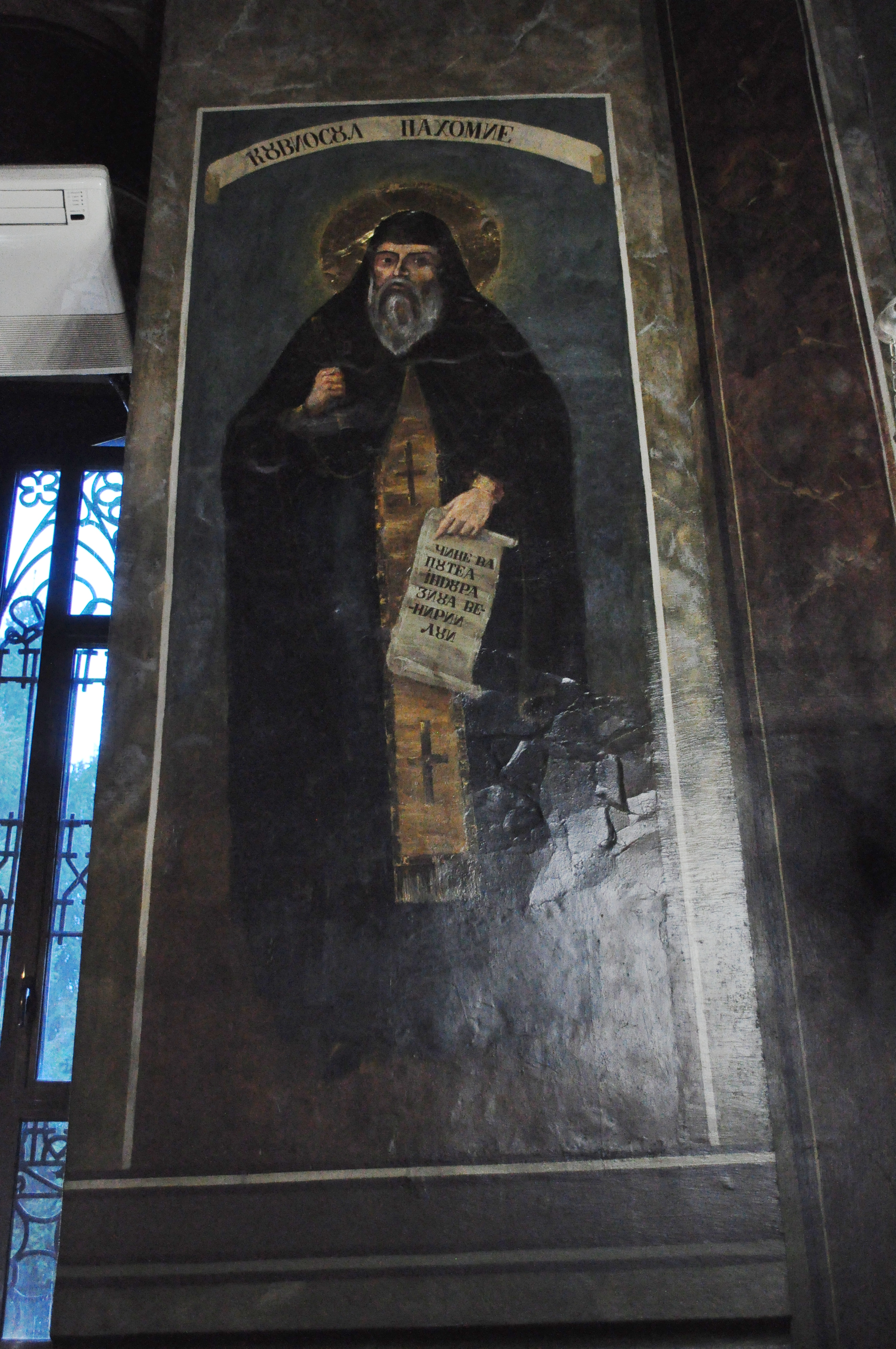
Painting of Pachomius the Great in the Curtea Veche Church, Bucharest.

Pachomius continued as abbot to the cenobites for some thirty years. During an epidemic (probably plague), Pachomius called the monks, strengthened their faith, and failed to appoint his successor. Pachomius then died on 14 Pashons, 64 AM (9 May 348 AD).

By the time Pachomius died, eight monasteries and several hundred monks followed his guidance. Within a generation, cenobic practices spread from Egypt to Palestine and the Judean Desert, Syria, North Africa and eventually Western Europe. The number of monks, rather than the number of monasteries, may have reached 7000.

His reputation as a holy man has endured. As mentioned above, several liturgical calendars commemorate Pachomius. Among many miracles attributed to Pachomius, that though he had never learned the Greek or Latin tongues, he sometimes miraculously spoke them. Pachomius is also credited with being the first Christian to use and recommend use of a prayer rope.

== See also ==
- Anthony of Egypt
- St. Benedict
- Book of the First Monks
- Coptic monasticism
- Coptic saints
- Desert Fathers
- Pachomian monasteries
