= May 1 =

May 1 this year in various calendars
- Friday, 1 May 2026
Akan	Nkyifie
Armenian	15 Mareri 1475
Aztec	Xocotlhuetzi 11, 8 Quiyahuitl
Babylonian	13 Nisanu, 2337 SE
Balinese pawukon	Luang, Pepet, Kajeng, Jaya, Pon, Urukung, Sukra of Kulantir, Guru, Erangan, Duka
Bengali	18 Boisakh, BS 1433
Chinese	Yin Wood Pig・Neck Mansion; Fire Horse Year, Month 3, Day 15 (Guyu, 4 days until Lixia)
Common Era	1 May 2026 CE
Coptic	23 Parmouti, AM 1742
Egyptian	15 Thoth, 2775 NE
Ethiopian	23 Miyāzyā, 2018 Amätä Məhrät
French Republican	Décade II, Duodi de Floréal de l'Année 234 de la République
Gregorian	1 May, AD 2026
Hebrew	14 Iyar, AM 5786; Omer 29
Hindu	Svātī・Siddhi; Solar: 18 Vaiśākha, 1948 SE; Lunisolar: Pūrṇimā, Śukla pakṣa of Vaiśākha, 2083 VE; Rāudra・5127 KY・1,872,696
Icelandic	Föstudagur, 9 Harpa 2026
Islamic	14 Dhu al-Qi'dah, AH 1447 (using tabular method)
ISO week date	2026-W18-5
Japanese	15 Yayoi, Reiwa 8 (Kokuu, 4 days until Rikka)
Julian	18 April, AD 2026 (AM 7534)
Julian day	2461162
Korean	15 Yongdal, 4359 DE
Maya	13.0.13.9.19; 12 Uo, 8 Cauac
Roman	ante diem XIV Kalendas Maias, MMDCCLXXIX AUC
Solar Hijri	11 Ordibehesht, SH 1405
Tibetan	15 nag pa, me pho rta 2153 or 1772 or 1000

<<	May					>>
Su	Mo	Tu	We	Th	Fr	Sa
					1	2
3	4	5	6	7	8	9
10	11	12	13	14	15	16
17	18	19	20	21	22	23
24	25	26	27	28	29	30
31
2026

May 1 in recent years
2026 (Friday)
2025 (Thursday)
2024 (Wednesday)
2023 (Monday)
2022 (Sunday)
2021 (Saturday)
2020 (Friday)
2019 (Wednesday)
2018 (Tuesday)
2017 (Monday)

May 1 is the 121st day of the year (122nd in leap years) in the Gregorian calendar; 244 days remain until the end of the year.

== Events ==
=== Pre-1600 ===
- 418 – A synod in Carthage condemns Pelagianism.
- 1169 – Norman mercenaries land at Bannow Bay in Leinster, marking the beginning of the Norman invasion of Ireland.
- 1328 – Wars of Scottish Independence end: By the Treaty of Edinburgh–Northampton, England recognises Scotland as an independent state.
- 1455 – Scottish Royal forces loyal to King James II defeat a rebel army of the Black Douglases in the battle of Arkinholm.
- 1492 – The Edict of Expulsion is officially proclaimed in Castile, requiring all Jewish residents to leave within three months.

=== 1601–1900 ===
- 1669 – Henry Morgan's raid on Lake Maracaibo: the Spanish Armada de Barlovento is defeated by an English Privateer fleet led by Captain Henry Morgan.
- 1707 – The Act of Union joining England and Scotland to form the Kingdom of Great Britain takes effect.
- 1753 – Publication of Species Plantarum by Linnaeus, and the formal start date of plant taxonomy adopted by the International Code of Botanical Nomenclature.
- 1807 – The Slave Trade Act 1807 takes effect, abolishing the slave trade within the British Empire.
- 1820 – Execution of the Cato Street Conspirators, who plotted to kill the British Cabinet and Prime Minister Lord Liverpool.
- 1851 – Queen Victoria opens The Great Exhibition at The Crystal Palace in London.
- 1863 – American Civil War: The Battle of Chancellorsville between Robert E. Lee's Confederate Army of Northern Virginia and the Union Army of the Potomac under Joseph Hooker begins.
- 1863 – American Civil War: During the Vicksburg campaign, Union forces under Ulysses S. Grant win the Battle of Port Gibson and establish a firm presence on the east side of the Mississippi River.
- 1865 – The Empire of Brazil, Argentina, and Uruguay sign the Treaty of the Triple Alliance.
- 1866 – The Memphis Race Riots begin. Over three days, 46 blacks and two whites were killed. Reports of the atrocities influenced passage of the Fourteenth Amendment to the United States Constitution.
- 1886 – Rallies are held throughout the United States demanding the eight-hour work day, culminating in the Haymarket affair in Chicago, in commemoration of which May 1 is celebrated as International Workers' Day in many countries.
- 1891 – The 1891 New Orleans Lynchings: 11 Italian immigrants are lynched by a mob in Louisiana, USA after the acquittal of several defendants in a murder case, the largest mass lynching in U.S. history.
- 1891 – On Labor Day in Catania, Sicily, workers establish the first successful Fascio Siciliano, launching a movement of peasants and laborers protesting poverty, landlordism, taxation, and economic hardship across Sicily.
- 1894 – Coxey's Army, the first significant American protest march, arrives in Washington, D.C.
- 1896 – While on a pilgrimage of Shah Abdol-Azim Shrine in Ray, Tehran, Naser al-Din Shah of Qajar Persia, was assassinated by Mirza Reza Kermani.
- 1898 – Spanish–American War: Battle of Manila Bay: The Asiatic Squadron of the United States Navy destroys the Pacific Squadron of the Spanish Navy after a seven-hour battle. Spain loses all seven of its ships, and 381 Spanish sailors die. There are no American vessel losses or combat deaths.
- 1900 – The Scofield Mine disaster kills over 200 men in Scofield, Utah in what is to date the fifth-worst mining accident in United States history.

=== 1901–present ===
- 1921 – The Jaffa riots begin.
- 1929 – The 7.2 M_{w} Kopet Dag earthquake shakes the Iran–Turkmenistan border region with a maximum Mercalli intensity of IX (Violent), killing up to 3,800 and injuring 1,121.
- 1945 – World War II: German radio broadcasts news of Adolf Hitler's death, falsely stating that he has "fallen at his command post in the Reich Chancellery fighting to the last breath against Bolshevism and for Germany". The Soviet flag is raised over the Reich Chancellery, by order of Stalin. Up to 2,500 people die in a mass suicide in Demmin following the advance of the Red Army.
- 1946 – Start of three-year Pilbara strike of Indigenous Australians.
- 1947 – Portella della Ginestra massacre against May Day celebrations in Sicily by the bandit and separatist leader Salvatore Giuliano where 11 persons are killed and 33 wounded.
- 1957 – A Vickers VC.1 Viking crashes while attempting to return to Blackbushe Airport in Yateley, killing 34.
- 1960 – Cold War: U-2 incident: Francis Gary Powers, in a Lockheed U-2 spyplane, is shot down over the Sverdlovsk Oblast, Soviet Union, sparking a diplomatic crisis.
- 1970 – Vietnam War: A student anti-war strike erupts in response to U.S. and South Vietnamese forces attacking Vietnamese communists in a Cambodian Campaign.
- 1982 – Operation Black Buck: The Royal Air Force attacks the Argentine Air Force during the Falklands War.
- 1991 – Angolan Civil War: The MPLA and UNITA agree to the Bicesse Accords, which are formally signed on May 31 in Lisbon.
- 1993 – Sri Lankan President Ranasinghe Premadasa is assassinated in Colombo in a suicide bombing carried out by the Liberation Tigers of Tamil Eelam.
- 1994 – Three-time Formula One champion Ayrton Senna is killed in an accident during the San Marino Grand Prix.
- 1997 – The Labour Party wins the 1997 General Election and Tony Blair is elected as Prime Minister.
- 2003 – Invasion of Iraq: In what becomes known as the "Mission Accomplished" speech, on board the USS Abraham Lincoln (off the coast of California), U.S. President George W. Bush declares that "major combat operations in Iraq have ended".
- 2004 – Cyprus, Czech Republic, Estonia, Hungary, Latvia, Lithuania, Malta, Poland, Slovakia, and Slovenia join the European Union, celebrated at the residence of the Irish President in Dublin.
- 2009 – Same-sex marriage in Sweden is legalized.
- 2010 – Faisal Shahzad attempts to detonate a car bomb in Times Square, but the bomb fails to go off.
- 2011 – Pope John Paul II is beatified by his successor, Pope Benedict XVI.
- 2018 – Syrian civil war: The Syrian Democratic Forces (SDF) resumes the Deir ez-Zor campaign in order to clear the remnants of the Islamic State of Iraq and the Levant (ISIL) from the Iraq–Syria border.
- 2019 – Naxalite attack in Gadchiroli district of India: Sixteen army soldiers, including a driver, killed in an IED blast. Naxals targeted an anti-Naxal operations team.
- 2019 – Naruhito ascends to the throne of Japan succeeding his father Akihito, beginning the Reiwa period.
- 2024 – The 2024 Loblaw boycott, a Canadian boycott against retail corporation and grocer Loblaw Companies, begins.
- 2026 – After a ransomware attack by the group ShinyHunters, the education platform Canvas operated by private company Instructure, goes offline, affecting thousands of educational institutions.

== Births ==
=== Pre-1600 ===
- 1218 – John I, Count of Hainaut, Flemish nobleman (died 1257)
- 1218 – Rudolf I of Germany, King of Germany 1273–1291 (died 1291)
- 1285 – Edmund FitzAlan, 2nd Earl of Arundel, English nobleman (died 1326)
- 1527 – Johannes Stadius, German astronomer, astrologer, mathematician (died 1579)
- 1545 – Franciscus Junius, French theologian (died 1602)
- 1579 – Wolphert Gerretse, Dutch-American farmer, co-founded New Netherland (died 1662)
- 1582 – Marco da Gagliano, Italian composer (died 1643)
- 1585 – Sophia Olelkovich Radziwill, Belarusian saint (died 1612)
- 1591 – Johann Adam Schall von Bell, German missionary and astronomer (died 1666)
- 1594 – John Haynes, English-American politician, 1st Governor of the Colony of Connecticut (died 1653)

=== 1601–1900 ===
- 1602 – William Lilly, English astrologer (died 1681)
- 1672 – Joseph Addison, English essayist, poet, playwright, and politician (died 1719)
- 1735 – Jan Hendrik van Kinsbergen, Dutch admiral and philanthropist (died 1819)
- 1751 – Judith Sargent Murray, American poet and playwright (died 1820)
- 1764 – Benjamin Henry Latrobe, English-American architect, designed the United States Capitol (died 1820)
- 1769 – Arthur Wellesley, 1st Duke of Wellington, Irish-English field marshal and politician, Prime Minister of the United Kingdom (died 1852)
- 1780 – Tabitha Moffatt Brown, officially designated as the “Mother of Oregon” (died 1858)
- 1783 – Phoebe Hinsdale Brown, American hymnwriter (died 1861)
- 1803 – James Clarence Mangan, Irish poet and author (died 1849)
- 1811 – Andreas Laskaratos, Greek satirical poet and writer (died 1901)
- 1821 – Henry Ayers, English-Australian politician, 8th Premier of South Australia (died 1897)
- 1824 – Alexander William Williamson, English chemist and academic (died 1904)
- 1825 – Johann Jakob Balmer, Swiss mathematician and physicist (died 1898)
- 1825 – George Inness, American painter and educator (died 1894)
- 1827 – Jules Breton, French painter (died 1906)
- 1829 – José de Alencar, Brazilian author and playwright (died 1877)
- 1829 – Frederick Sandys, English painter and illustrator (died 1904)
- 1830 – Guido Gezelle, Belgian priest and poet (died 1899)
- 1831 – Emily Stowe, Canadian physician and activist (died 1903)
- 1846 – James C. Corrigan, Canadian-American businessman (died 1908)
- 1847 – Henry Demarest Lloyd, American journalist and politician (died 1903)
- 1848 – Adelsteen Normann, Norwegian painter (died 1919)
- 1850 – Prince Arthur, Duke of Connaught and Strathearn (died 1942)
- 1852 – Calamity Jane, American frontierswoman and professional scout (died 1903)
- 1852 – Santiago Ramón y Cajal, Spanish neuroscientist and pathologist, Nobel Prize laureate (died 1934)
- 1853 – Jacob Mikhailovich Gordin, Ukrainian-American journalist, actor, and playwright (died 1909)
- 1855 – Cecilia Beaux, American painter and academic (died 1942)
- 1857 – Theo van Gogh, Dutch art dealer (died 1891)
- 1859 – Jacqueline Comerre-Paton, French painter and sculptor (died 1955)
- 1862 – Marcel Prévost, French novelist and playwright (died 1941)
- 1864 – Anna Jarvis, American founder of Mother's Day (died 1948)
- 1871 – Seakle Greijdanus, Dutch theologian and scholar (died 1948)
- 1872 – Hugo Alfvén, Swedish composer, conductor, violinist, and painter (died 1960)
- 1872 – Sidónio Pais, Portuguese soldier and politician, 4th President of Portugal (died 1918)
- 1874 – Romaine Brooks, American-French painter and illustrator (died 1970)
- 1874 – Paul Van Asbroeck, Belgian sport shooter (died 1959)
- 1875 – Dave Hall, American runner, coach, and professor (died 1972)
- 1881 – Pierre Teilhard de Chardin, French priest, palaeontologist, and philosopher (died 1955)
- 1884 – Francis Curzon, 5th Earl Howe, English race car driver and politician (died 1964)
- 1885 – Clément Pansaers, Belgian poet (died 1922)
- 1887 – Alan Cunningham, Anglo-Irish general and diplomat, High Commissioners for Palestine and Transjordan (died 1983)
- 1890 – Clelia Lollini, Italian physician (died 1963 or 1964)
- 1891 – Lillian Estelle Fisher, American historian of Spanish America (died 1988)
- 1895 – May Hollinworth, Australian theatre producer and director (died 1968)
- 1895 – Nikolai Yezhov, Soviet secret police official, head of the NKVD (died 1940)
- 1896 – Herbert Backe, German agronomist and politician (died 1947)
- 1896 – Mark W. Clark, American general (died 1984)
- 1896 – J. Lawton Collins, American general (died 1987)
- 1898 – Alfred Schmidt, Estonian weightlifter (died 1972)
- 1900 – Ignazio Silone, Italian journalist and politician (died 1978)
- 1900 – Aleksander Wat, Polish poet and writer (died 1967)

=== 1901–present ===
- 1901 – Sterling Allen Brown, American poet, academic, and critic (died 1989)
- 1901 – Antal Szerb, Hungarian scholar and author (died 1945)
- 1905 – Henry Koster, German-American director, producer, and screenwriter (died 1988)
- 1907 – Kate Smith, American singer and actress (died 1986)
- 1908 – Giovannino Guareschi, Italian journalist and author (died 1968)
- 1908 – Morris Kline, American mathematician and academic (died 1992)
- 1909 – Yiannis Ritsos, Greek poet and playwright (died 1990)
- 1910 – Raya Dunayevskaya, Ukrainian-American philosopher and activist (died 1987)
- 1910 – J. Allen Hynek, American astronomer and ufologist (died 1986)
- 1912 – Otto Kretschmer, German admiral (died 1998)
- 1913 – Louis Nye, American actor (died 2005)
- 1915 – Hanns Martin Schleyer, German business executive (died 1977)
- 1916 – Glenn Ford, Canadian-American actor and producer (died 2006)
- 1917 – John Beradino, American baseball player and actor (died 1996)
- 1917 – Ulric Cross, Trinidadian navigator, judge, and diplomat (died 2013)
- 1917 – Danielle Darrieux, French actress and singer (died 2017)
- 1918 – Jack Paar, American comedian, author and talk show host (died 2004)
- 1919 – Manna Dey, Indian singer and composer (died 2013)
- 1919 – Mohammed Karim Lamrani, Moroccan businessman and politician, 7th Prime Minister of Morocco (died 2018)
- 1919 – Dan O'Herlihy, Irish actor (died 2005)
- 1921 – Vladimir Colin, Romanian journalist and author (died 1991)
- 1923 – Joseph Heller, American novelist, short story writer, and playwright (died 1999)
- 1923 – Marcel Rayman, Polish militant (died 1944)
- 1924 – Evelyn Boyd Granville, American mathematician, computer scientist, and academic (died 2023)
- 1924 – Terry Southern, American novelist, essayist, and screenwriter (died 1995)
- 1925 – Chuck Bednarik, American lieutenant and football player (died 2015)
- 1925 – Scott Carpenter, American commander, pilot, and astronaut (died 2013)
- 1926 – Peter Lax, Hungarian-American mathematician and academic (died 2025)
- 1927 – Greta Andersen, Danish swimmer (died 2023)
- 1927 – Bernard Vukas, Yugoslav-Croatian footballer (died 1983)
- 1927 – Albert Zafy, Malagasy politician, 3rd President of Madagascar (died 2017)
- 1928 – Sonny James, American singer-songwriter and guitarist (died 2016)
- 1929 – Ralf Dahrendorf, German-English sociologist and politician (died 2009)
- 1929 – Sonny Ramadhin, Trinidadian cricketer (died 2022)
- 1930 – Ollie Matson, American sprinter and football player (died 2011)
- 1930 – Richard Riordan, American lieutenant and politician, 39th Mayor of Los Angeles and publisher (died 2023)
- 1930 – Little Walter Jacobs, American blues harp player and singer (died 1968)
- 1932 – S. M. Krishna, Indian politician and statesman, Minister of External Affairs, 10th Chief Minister of Karnataka, 19th Governor of Maharashtra (died 2024)
- 1932 – Sandy Woodward, English admiral (died 2013)
- 1934 – Laura Betti, Italian actress (died 2004)
- 1934 – Cuauhtémoc Cárdenas, Mexican politician (died 2026)
- 1934 – Shirley Horn, American singer and pianist (died 2005)
- 1937 – Una Stubbs, English actress and dancer (died 2021)
- 1939 – Judy Collins, American singer-songwriter and guitarist
- 1945 – Rita Coolidge, American singer-songwriter
- 1946 – Joanna Lumley, English actress, voice-over artist, author, and activist
- 1946 – John Woo, Hong Kong director, producer, and screenwriter
- 1948 – Patricia Hill Collins, American sociologist and scholar
- 1949 – Tim Hodgkinson, English saxophonist, clarinet player, and composer
- 1950 – Danny McGrain, Scottish footballer and coach
- 1951 – Gordon Greenidge, Barbadian cricketer and coach
- 1951 – Sally Mann, American photographer
- 1952 – Richard Blundell, English economist and academic
- 1954 – Ray Parker Jr., American singer-songwriter, guitarist, and producer
- 1954 – Joel Rosenberg, Canadian-American author and activist (died 2011)
- 1955 – Martin O'Donnell, American composer
- 1957 – Rick Darling, Australian cricketer
- 1959 – Yasmina Reza, French actress and playwright
- 1961 – Clint Malarchuk, Canadian ice hockey player and coach
- 1961 – Marilyn Milian, American judge
- 1962 – Maia Morgenstern, Romanian actress
- 1964 – Yvonne van Gennip, Dutch speed skater
- 1966 – Olaf Thon, German footballer
- 1967 – Tim McGraw, American singer-songwriter and actor
- 1968 – Oliver Bierhoff, German footballer
- 1968 – D'arcy Wretzky, American bass player and singer
- 1969 – Wes Anderson, American director, producer, and screenwriter
- 1969 – Mary Lou McDonald, Irish politician
- 1969 – Billy Owens, American basketball player
- 1970 – Bernard Butler, English singer-songwriter, guitarist, and producer
- 1971 – Ethan Albright, American football player
- 1971 – Stuart Appleby, Australian golfer
- 1971 – Ajith Kumar, Indian actor and race car driver
- 1972 – Ramzi bin al-Shibh, Yemeni terrorist
- 1972 – Julie Benz, American actress
- 1973 – Curtis Martin, American football player
- 1973 – Oliver Neuville, German footballer
- 1975 – Alexey Smertin, Russian international footballer
- 1976 – James Murray, American comedian
- 1978 – James Badge Dale, American actor
- 1978 – Michael Russell, American tennis player
- 1979 – Mauro Bergamasco, Italian rugby player
- 1980 – Jan Heylen, Belgian race car driver
- 1980 – Jay Reatard, American singer-songwriter and guitarist (died 2010)
- 1981 – Alexander Hleb, Belarusian footballer
- 1981 – Wes Welker, American football player and coach
- 1982 – Beto, Portuguese footballer
- 1982 – Jamie Dornan, Northern Irish model and actor
- 1982 – Tommy Robredo, Spanish tennis player
- 1982 – Darijo Srna, Croatian footballer
- 1982 – Katya Zamolodchikova, American drag queen
- 1983 – Alain Bernard, French swimmer
- 1983 – Park Hae-jin, South Korean actor
- 1983 – Craig Williams, American wrestler
- 1984 – David Backes, American ice hockey player
- 1986 – Christian Benítez, Ecuadorian footballer (died 2013)
- 1986 – Jesse Klaver, Dutch politician
- 1987 – Leonardo Bonucci, Italian footballer
- 1987 – Amir Johnson, American basketball player
- 1987 – Shahar Pe'er, Israeli tennis player
- 1988 – Anushka Sharma, Indian actress and film producer
- 1988 – Mayky Vilaça, Brazilian politician
- 1989 – Victoria Monét, American singer-songwriter
- 1990 – Scooter Gennett, American baseball player
- 1990 – Caitlin Stasey, Australian actress
- 1991 – Marcus Stroman, American baseball player
- 1992 – Madeline Brewer, American actress
- 1992 – Hani, South Korean singer and actress
- 1992 – Bradley Roby, American football player
- 1996 – William Nylander, Canadian-Swedish ice hockey player
- 1997 – Miles Sanders, American football player
- 1999 – YNW Melly, American rapper
- 1999 – Tiffany Stratton, American wrestler
- 2000 – Rema, Nigerian singer-songwriter and rapper
- 2002 – Camilla Araujo, American influencer
- 2002 – Chet Holmgren, American basketball player
- 2003 – Lizzy Greene, American actress
- 2004 – Charli D'Amelio, American social media influencer and dancer
- 2005 – Linda Fruhvirtová, Czech tennis player
- 2006 – Lewis Miley, English footballer

== Deaths ==
=== Pre-1600 ===
- 408 – Arcadius, Byzantine emperor from 383 to 408 (born 377)
- 558 – Marcouf, Christian abbot and saint
- 908 – Wang Zongji, Chinese prince and pretender
- 1118 – Matilda of Scotland, Queen of England from 1100 to 1118 (born 1080)
- 1171 – Diarmait Mac Murchada, King of Leinster from 1127 to 1171 (born 1110)
- 1187 – Roger de Moulins, Grand Master of the Knights Hospitaller
- 1255 – Walter de Gray, English prelate and statesman
- 1278 – William II of Villehardouin, Prince of Achaea from 1246 to 1278
- 1308 – Albert I of Germany (born 1255)
- 1539 – Isabella of Portugal (born 1503)
- 1555 – Pope Marcellus II (born 1501)
- 1572 – Pope Pius V (born 1504)

=== 1601–1900 ===
- 1668 – Frans Luycx, Flemish painter (born 1604)
- 1730 – François de Troy, French painter and engraver (born 1645)
- 1731 – Johann Ludwig Bach, German violinist and composer (born 1677)
- 1738 – Charles Howard, 3rd Earl of Carlisle, English politician, First Lord of the Treasury (born 1669)
- 1772 – Gottfried Achenwall, Polish-German historian, economist, and jurist (born 1719)
- 1813 – Jean-Baptiste Bessières, French general (born 1768)
- 1838 – Antoine Louis Dugès, French obstetrician and naturalist (born 1797)
- 1873 – David Livingstone, Scottish-English missionary and explorer (born 1813)

=== 1901–present ===
- 1904 – Antonín Dvořák, Czech composer (born 1841)
- 1907 – Grigorios Maraslis, Greek philanthropist (born 1831)
- 1913 – John Barclay Armstrong, American Texas ranger (born 1850)
- 1920 – Princess Margaret of Connaught, Crown Princess of Sweden (born 1882)
- 1935 – Henri Pélissier, French cyclist (born 1889)
- 1944 – Napoleon Soukatzidis, Greek communist and trade unionist (born 1909)
- 1945 – Joseph Goebbels, German lawyer and politician, Chancellor of Germany (born 1897)
- 1945 – Magda Goebbels, German wife of Joseph Goebbels (born 1901)
- 1953 – Everett Shinn, American painter and illustrator (born 1876)
- 1955 – William Thomson Sloper, American stockbroker and survivor of the sinking of the RMS Titanic (born 1883)
- 1956 – LeRoy Samse, American pole vaulter (born 1883)
- 1960 – Charles Holden, English architect, designed the Bristol Central Library (born 1875)
- 1963 – Lope K. Santos, Filipino lawyer and politician (born 1879)
- 1965 – Spike Jones, American singer and bandleader (born 1911)
- 1968 – Jack Adams, Canadian-American ice hockey player, coach, and manager (born 1895)
- 1968 – Harold Nicolson, English author and politician (born 1886)
- 1970 – Yi Un, Korean crown prince (born 1897)
- 1973 – Asger Jorn, Danish painter and sculptor (born 1914)
- 1976 – T. R. M. Howard, American surgeon and activist (born 1908)
- 1976 – Alexandros Panagoulis, Greek poet and politician (born 1939)
- 1978 – Aram Khachaturian, Armenian composer and conductor (born 1903)
- 1982 – William Primrose, Scottish viola player and educator (born 1903)
- 1984 – Jüri Lossmann, Estonian long-distance runner (born 1891)
- 1985 – Denise Robins, English journalist and author (born 1897)
- 1986 – Hylda Baker, English comedian, actress and music hall performer (born 1905)
- 1986 – Hugo Peretti, American songwriter and producer (born 1916)
- 1988 – Ben Lexcen, Australian sailor and architect (born 1936)
- 1989 – Sally Kirkland, American journalist (born 1912)
- 1989 – V. M. Panchalingam, Sri Lankan civil servant (born 1934)
- 1989 – Patrice Tardif, Canadian farmer and politician (born 1904)
- 1990 – Sergio Franchi, Italian-American tenor and actor (born 1926)
- 1991 – Richard Thorpe, American director and screenwriter (born 1896)
- 1993 – Pierre Bérégovoy, French metallurgist and politician, Prime Minister of France (born 1925)
- 1993 – Ranasinghe Premadasa, Sri Lankan politician, 3rd President of Sri Lanka (born 1924)
- 1994 – Ayrton Senna, Brazilian race car driver (born 1960)
- 1997 – Fernand Dumont, Canadian sociologist, philosopher, and poet (born 1927)
- 1998 – Eldridge Cleaver, American author and activist (born 1935)
- 2000 – Steve Reeves, American bodybuilder and actor (born 1926)
- 2003 – Miss Elizabeth, American wrestler and manager (born 1960)
- 2003 – Wim van Est, Dutch cyclist (born 1923)
- 2005 – Kenneth Clark, American psychologist and academic (born 1914)
- 2008 – Anthony Mamo, Maltese judge and politician, 1st President of Malta (born 1909)
- 2008 – Philipp von Boeselager, German soldier and economist (born 1917)
- 2010 – Helen Wagner, American actress (born 1918)
- 2011 – Henry Cooper, English boxer (born 1934)
- 2011 – Ted Lowe, English sportscaster (born 1920)
- 2012 – James Kinley, Canadian engineer and politician, 29th Lieutenant Governor of Nova Scotia (born 1925)
- 2012 – Mordechai Virshubski, German-Israeli lawyer and politician (born 1930)
- 2013 – Chris Kelly, American rapper (born 1978)
- 2014 – Adamu Atta, Nigerian lawyer and politician, 5th Governor of Kwara State (born 1927)
- 2014 – Radhia Cousot, French computer scientist and academic (born 1947)
- 2014 – Assi Dayan, Israeli actor, director, and screenwriter (born 1945)
- 2014 – Juan de Dios Castillo, Mexican footballer and coach (born 1951)
- 2015 – Geoff Duke, English-Manx motorcycle racer (born 1923)
- 2015 – Vafa Guluzade, Azerbaijani political scientist, academic, and diplomat (born 1940)
- 2015 – María Elena Velasco, Mexican actress, singer, director, and screenwriter (born 1940)
- 2015 – Grace Lee Whitney, American actress (born 1930)
- 2021 – Olympia Dukakis, American actress (born 1931)
- 2023 – Gordon Lightfoot, Canadian singer-songwriter and guitarist (born 1938)

== Holidays and observances ==
- Christian feast day:
  - Aldebrandus
  - Amator
  - Andeolus
  - Aredius of Gap
  - Asaph
  - Augustin Schoeffler, Jean-Louis Bonnard (part of Vietnamese Martyrs)
  - Benedict of Szkalka
  - Bertha of Val d'Or
  - Brioc
  - James the Less (Anglican Communion)
  - Jeremiah
  - Saint Joseph the Worker (Roman Catholic)
  - Julian of Bale
  - Blessed Klymentiy Sheptytsky (Ukrainian Greek Catholic Church)
  - Mafalda of Portugal
  - Marcouf
  - Orientius
  - Peregrine Laziosi
  - Philip the Apostle (Anglican Communion, Lutheran Church)
  - Richard Pampuri
  - Seven Apostolic Men
    - Caecilius of Elvira
    - Ctesiphon of Vergium
    - Euphrasius of Illiturgis
    - Hesychius of Cazorla
    - Indaletius
    - Secundus of Abula
    - Torquatus of Acci
  - Sigismund of Burgundy
  - Theodard
  - Ultan
  - May 1 (Eastern Orthodox liturgics)
- Armed Forces Day (Mauritania)
- Constitution Day (Argentina, Latvia, Marshall Islands)
- Commemoration of the states of Maharashtra and Gujarat following the foundation of Samyukta Maharashtra Samiti (India):
  - Maharashtra Day
- International Sunflower Guerrilla Gardening Day
- Lei Day (Hawaii)
- International Workers' Day or Labour Day (International), and its related observances:
  - Law Day (United States), formerly intended to counterbalance the celebration of Labour Day. (United States)
  - Loyalty Day, formerly intended to counterbalance the celebration of Labour Day. (United States)
- May Day (beginning of Summer) observances in the Northern hemisphere (see April 30):
  - Calan Mai (Wales)
  - Beltane (Gaelic)
