= Francisco de Gurmendi =

Francisco de Gurmendi (fl. 1603 – c. 1621) was a Spanish-Basque orientalist, royal interpreter of Arabic, Turkish, and Persian at the court of King Philip III of Spain. He played a central role in the intellectual and political debates of early 17th-century Spain concerning the Islamic world, the authenticity of the so-called Lead Books of Sacromonte, and the classification of Arabic manuscripts seized from North Africa.

== Early life and education ==
Francisco de Gurmendi was born in Zarautz, in the province of Gipuzkoa, into a noble Basque family. His father Jorge de Gurmendi served several terms as mayor of Zarautz and established a family entail in 1605. His mother, María Juana de Amilibia, also founded a separate family entail. Through connections with the influential Idiáquez family, Francisco was sent to Madrid as a youth, where he was taken into the household of Juan de Idiáquez, President of the Council of Orders and former secretary to King Philip II. Initially a student of Diego de Urrea and later of Marcos Dobelio, Gurmendi mastered Arabic and later learned Turkish and Persian. He produced lexicons and thesauri in these languages, although these works have not survived, possibly due to the 1617 fire at El Escorial Library. His command of classical Arabic and understanding of Islamic theological and legal vocabulary made him a valuable asset to the Spanish court.

== Royal service ==
Gurmendi began official service at court by 1603 and was receiving a stipend by 1607. By 1612, his salary rose to 600 ducats annually, later reaching 1,000, though he unsuccessfully petitioned for Urrea's former title and higher salary. He served as interpreter for high-level diplomatic exchanges, including correspondence involving the Ottoman Empire and the Saadian dynasty of Morocco. His official tasks included examining and translating the seized Zaydani Library of the Saadian sultan Muley Zidan in 1612. He helped classify its contents, thousands of manuscripts dealing with theology, philosophy, medicine, history, and was entrusted with transporting them to the Escorial library and selecting texts for translation. Two of these works were translated by Gurmendi: one was published in 1615 as Doctrina Physica y Moral de Príncipes, dedicated to the Duke of Lerma; the other, Libro de las calidades del Rey, remains unpublished but exists in manuscript form in the Basque Parliament Library and the Lambeth Palace Library in London.

=== Involvement in the Sacromonte controversy ===
Gurmendi became involved in one of the most heated theological and political debates of his time: the authenticity of the so-called Lead Books (Libros Plúmbeos) of Sacromonte, discovered in Granada between 1588 and 1595. These artefacts, inscribed in a peculiar Arabic script, claimed to link the city of Granada to early Christianity and emphasised the use of Arabic in transmitting Christian doctrine. While some ecclesiastics supported their authenticity, including Archbishop Pedro de Castro, prominent humanists such as Pedro de Valencia and Arias Montano viewed them as forgeries of morisco origin, possibly created to resist the impending expulsion of the moriscos.

At the request of royal confessor Fray Luis de Aliaga and with the support of Pedro de Valencia, Gurmendi translated two of the Lead Books: Fundamentum Ecclesiae and Essentia Dei. His translations, accompanied by theological commentary by the ex-Jesuit Martín Derrotarán y Mendiola, highlighted numerous linguistic and doctrinal anomalies. He noted imitations of Quranic phrases, incorrect grammar, and expressions uncharacteristic of early Christian writings, identifying Islamic theological elements incompatible with Catholic orthodoxy. In 1616 and 1617, Gurmendi submitted two detailed memorials to the crown and the Holy Office, criticising the books' content and the previous translations made under the auspices of the Sacromonte circle. These memorials triggered a strong reaction from pro-Plomos factions, who accused Gurmendi of incompetence and even questioned his knowledge of Arabic. Despite their opposition, Gurmendi's interpretation was taken seriously by the Inquisition and used to justify restrictions on publication and discussion of the Plomos.

Gurmendi, alongside Pedro de Valencia and other sceptics of the Plomos, came under increased scrutiny by the supporters of Archbishop Castro. By 1618, amid a changing political climate and the fall of the Duke of Lerma, Gurmendi's circle faced direct harassment, including house searches and Inquisition monitoring. Though ordered to remain silent, Gurmendi continued his efforts. His memorials were sent to Rome through nuncio Camillo Caetani with the approval of the royal confessor. The lead book supporters, including agents like Francisco de Barahona, claimed Gurmendi used incorrect copies and lacked theological understanding. However, Gurmendi cited Islamic commentators such as al-Zamakhshari and al-Baydawi, and used philological and doctrinal criteria to argue for the falsity of the texts.

== Final years and death ==
By 1618, Gurmendi had health problems and withdrew from his duties at the Escorial library. He wrote a final letter in August 1618, likely addressed to the Duke of Lerma, mentioning illness. He is believed to have died shortly after 31 March 1621, the same day as King Philip III, according to some sources. Though pro-Plomos narratives claimed he died violently as divine retribution, the most likely cause was natural illness. His successor as royal interpreter was David Colville.

== Doctrina Physica y Moral de Príncipes ==
Gurmendi's Doctrina Physica y Moral de Príncipes (1615) is a mirror-for-princes treatise, presented as a translation from Arabic and dedicated to the Duke of Lerma. The work drew upon Gurmendi's experience as a translator of Arabic, Persian, and Turkish texts and was influenced by both Tacitean historiography and Islamic ethical-political literature. It combines moral instruction, political advice, and sapiential anecdotes drawn from diverse traditions. According to María Isabel Llopis Mena, the text exhibits features typical of the Arabic-Persian "mirrors for princes" genre, including narrative exempla, maxims, and digressions framed as courtly dialogues. Gurmendi's stated aim was to make the wisdom of Arabic authors accessible to Spanish readers, demonstrating the intellectual wealth of Islamic civilisation while Christianising its philosophical content. His approach reflected a humanist philological method rooted in the school of Pedro de Valencia and Arias Montano. While the Doctrina had little editorial success - only a single edition was published in 1615 - it is of notable interest for its attempt to integrate Islamic political wisdom into Christian pedagogy. Gurmendi's introduction explicitly challenges those who doubted the existence of philosophical and theological literature among "infidels," seeking to disprove them by example. Don Juan of Persia also contributed to the book with a sonnet.
