= Thalthana =

Village in Aleppo Governorate, Syria

Thalthana (Arabic: ثلثانة ) is a village in the north of Syria, about 40 km north east of Aleppo and part of the Aleppo Governorate, near the Turkish border. Kurds are the majority of the population of the village.

Historically, the Northern Region was the most fertile and the most densely populated in Syria. An important source of income for this village is agriculture, such as the cultivation of Barley.

In June 2015, the village was occupied by forces of Islamic State, along with other places like Thalathina, Al Baroza, Al Zahera and Abla.

On 5 October 2016, an air strike caused the death of 13 civilians in Thalthana.
