= Pedro de Valencia (humanist) =

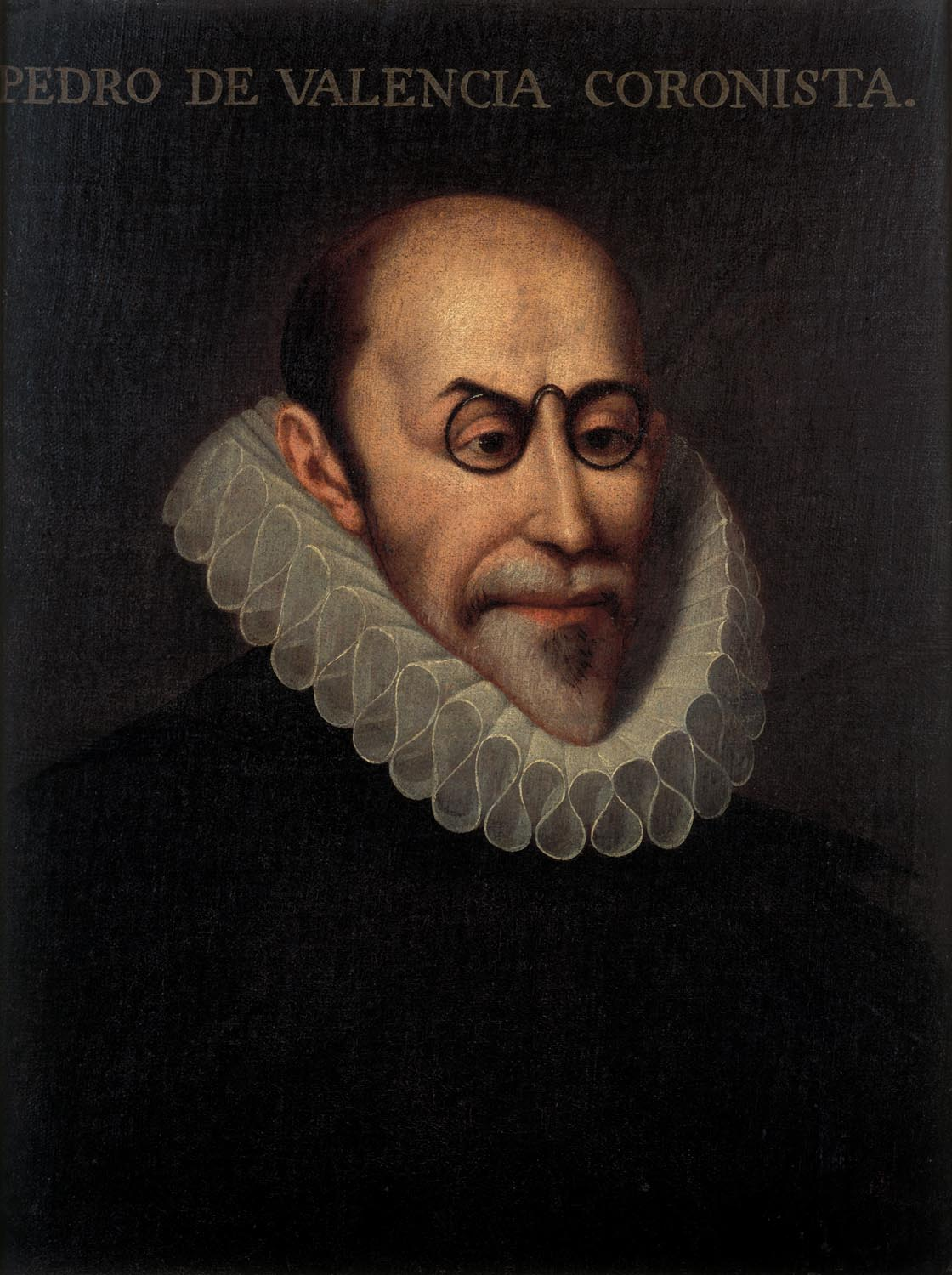
Anonymous portrait from the early 17th century, now in the Instituto Valencia de Don Juan

Pedro de Valencia (17 November 1555 – 10 April 1620) was a Spanish humanist, biblical scholar, chronicler and literary critic.

A royal chronicler from 1607, he produced reports attacking the authenticity of the Lead Books of Granada and criticizing the conduct of witch trials. In philosophy, he was a proponent of Neo-Stoicism. In theology, he was an ally of Benito Arias Montano and defended his Biblia Regia, especially its Latin translation of the Targumim, the Paraphrasis chaldaica. He argued against the expulsion of the Moriscos. He was a friend of Luis de Góngora and the first to write criticism of his poetry.

== Life ==
Valencia was born in Zafra on 17 November 1555 to Melchor de Valencia and Ana Vázquez. As his father worked for the Dukes of Feria, his earliest education was probably in the ducal school in Zafra run by Juan de Ávila. In 1567–1568, he studied arts and theology in the Jesuit college in Córdoba before going on to study law at the University of Salamanca in 1573–1575. At Salamanca, he studied Greek under Francisco Sánchez de las Brozas. There he also met and befriended Benito Arias Montano and José de Sigüenza. There is no record of his graduation, but he had been awarded a baccalaureate by 1588 and a licentiate by 1594.

From Salamanca, Valencia returned to Zafra in 1576. There he practiced law and, in his spare time, studied the Bible and the classics. He may have taught Greek and ancient Greek philosophy at the ducal school. He worked for Arias Montano as an amanuensis, which sometimes took him to Seville and La Peña de Aracena. In Seville, he had opportunities to discuss art with Francisco Pacheco. At La Peña between April 1578 and September 1579, he studied biblical exegesis and biblical Hebrew, Aramaic and Greek under Arias Montero. In 1587, he married Inés de Ballesteros. Their son Melchor was baptized in 1588 and a daughter, Beatriz, in 1594. Another son named Melchor was born in 1595.

When the costs of educating his children became onerous, Valencia asked Sigüenza to interecede on his behalf with the royal court for a position. On 4 May 1607, King Philip III appointed Valencia official chronicler of the Indies (cronista de Indias). On 22 May, he appointed him also official chronicler of the Kingdom of Castile (cronista del reino). Valencia moved with his family to Madrid.

Valencia was offered a chair at the University of Salamanca several times, but at the insistence of Philip III he refused. His physical and mental health declined in the last year of his life, perhaps from the stress of the public controversies over the Lead Books of Granada and the Paraphrasis chaldaica. He made out his last will and testament on 25 March 1620. He died in Madrid on 10 April. A few days later, Luis de Góngora wrote, "Our good Pedro de Valencia died last Friday. I have lamented it because of my love for our country, which has lost the individual who could best impress and argue against foreigners."

== Work ==
=== Philosophy ===
Valencia was a key figure in the rise of Neo-Stoicism and was in contact with Justus Lipsius. He was especially interested in the works of Dio Chrysostom and Epictetus. He translated Dio's Perianachorescos into Spanish as Del retiramiento ("Concerning Withdrawal from Public Life"). He also translated one of the Discourses of Epictetus. His own Neo-Stoic works include Exemplos de Principes, Prelados y otros Varones ilustres que dexaron Oficios y Dignidades y se retiraron ("Concerning Princes, Prelates and Other Illustrious Men who Set Aside Public Office and High Rank and Withdrew from Society") and Discurso sobre materias del Consejo de Estado escrito a una persona que le pidio dictamen ("Discourse on Affairs in the Council of State Written for a Person who Sought his Opinion").

The only work Valencia published in his lifetime is the Academica sive de iudicio erga verum ex ipsis primis fontibus, printed at Antwerp by Christophe Plantin in 1596. It is a discussion of the differences between the Academics and Stoics on epistemology. Valencia also wrote a Discurso fundado en el Epicteto de Arriano sobre los que pretenden vivir con quietud, a discourse based on Arrian's Discourses of Epictetus.

=== Theology ===
In his Para declaracion de vna gran parte de la Estoria Apostolica en los Actos, y en la epistola ad Galatas, a commentary on the Acts of the Apostles and the Epistle to the Galatians, Valencia mounts a defence of the connection between the apostle James the Great and Spain. He argues that James was assigned Spain as a mission field at the Council of Jerusalem and that the Spanish church can rightly be called apostolic. He also argues against the Spanish caste system and limpieza de sangre (purity of blood). He sees the debate within the Spanish church as paralleling the dispute between Peter and Paul and takes the Pauline position "that each one should join [the Church] in the state in which he found himself, at the time he heard the call of the Gospel." In his treatise Tratado acerca de los moriscos, he argues against the expulsion of the Moriscos.

With his brother-in-law Juan Moreno Ramírez, Valencia wrote a critique of Andrés de León's version of the Paraphrasis chaldaica, which was intended to correct that of Arias Montano's Biblia Regia. The Advertencias de Pedro de Valencia y de Juan Ramírez acerca de la impresión de la Paraphrasis chaldaica ("Observations of Pedro de Valencia and Juan Ramírez Concerning the Printing of the Paraphrasis Chaldaica") was submitted to the University of Alcalá for review on 10 October 1616. In 1618, the university ultimately forbade Andrés de León from publishing his version. Perhaps as a consequence of this serious dispute, Ramírez "was murdered in mysterious circumstances in 1626."

Valencia thought highly of Macarius the Great and translated his Homilies into Spanish and his Opuscles into Latin. He also wrote La tristeza según Dios y según el mundo ("Sadness as God Sees it and Worldly Sadness")

=== Political economy ===
Valencia wrote extensively on socioeconomic topics, deriving his theories mainly from the Bible. Based on his interpretation of the account of the fall of man in Genesis 3:17–19, he argued that agriculture is humanity's most fundamental activity, that all men must work, that land must be distributed so that all may work and that "there must be correlation between the basic needs for survival and workers' salaries". He favoured price controls and opposed debasement. He praised the value of manual labour and criticized the idleness of the nobility. He went so far as to oppose allowing tradesmen to send their sons to school unless one was left to take over the trade. His socioeconomic works include:

- Discurso o memorial sobre el precio del pan (1605)
- Discurso de Pedro de Valencia acerca de la moneda de vellón (1605)
- Discurso sobre el acrecentamiento de la labor de la tierra (1607)
- Discurso contra la ociosidad (1608)
- Al Rei, nuestro Señor, consideracion de Pedro de Valencia, su coronista, acerca de las enfermedades y salud del reyno (c. 1618)

=== Chronicles and reports ===
As chronicler of the Indies, Valencia wrote numerous notices (relaciones). These have been collected by Gaspar Morocho Gayo and published under the title Relaciones de Indias in two volumes, the first on New Granada and the Viceroyalty of Peru and the second on Mexico.

In 1607, Cardinal Bernardo de Sandoval y Rojas commissioned Valencia to write an assessment of the authenticity of the Parchment of the Torre Turpiana and the Lead Books of Granada, Sobre el pergamino y láminas de Granada (1607). He came down strongly against their authenticity. Noting that in the Parchment the name of John the Apostle is written in Arabic script as it would have been pronounced in contemporary Castilian, he ridicules the defenders for falling back on miracles to explain such discrepancies:

It cannot be denied that the person who wrote the parchment could speak Castilian as it is spoken to-day. It remains for its supporters to prove with similar certainty that it was spoken thus in the time of Nero. Or let them come up with a miracle or [divine] revelation, which is the way that all problems are solved.

Valencia argued that "the person who forged [the Lead Books] was a Moor [...] because [...] when attempting [...] to express Christian doctrines, formulae and terms, he could not avoid the formulae and language of the Qurʾān." By 1617, he seems to have been leading a group of scholars, including the translator Francisco de Gurmendi, that were working on the Parchment and Lead Books for the Inquisition.

In 1611, Valencia wrote two critical treatises on witchcraft for Bernardo de Sandoval y Rojas. These were a response to the auto de fe held at Logroño on 7–8 November 1610. In Acerca de los quentos de las brujas y cosas tocantes a magia ("Concerning the Witches' Tales and Matters Connected with Magic"), he laid down criteria for holding witch trials. In Suma de las relaciones de Logroño ("Compendium of the Accounts from Logroño"), he critically summarises what he has heard and read about witches, denying much popular folklore and pointing out that early Christians were also subject to false accusations of orgies, infanticide and cannibalism.

=== Art and art criticism ===
According to his correspondence with Pablo de Céspedes, Valencia had painted in his youth. In 1604, Céspedes dedicated to him his Discurso de la comparación de la Antigua y Moderna Pintura y Escultura. In 1605, he asked his advice on the appearance of Ptolemy Philopator's tessarakonteres ship. Valencia's duties as royal chronicler occasionally extended to artistic design. In 1609, Valencia designed new frescos for the Royal Palace of El Pardo, which had suffered a fire in 1604. The paintings were executed by Vincenzo Carducci and Francisco López. They are no longer visible, but some of Carducci's preliminary sketches are in his La crianza, vida y haañas de Aquiles. Somewhat later, Valencia and João Baptista Lavanha designed a series of emblems representing the political virtues for the Galería del Mediodía in the Royal Alcázar of Madrid. They do not seem to have been executed, but the autograph manuscript containing Valencia's description of his designs, Descripçion de la pintura de las virtudes, still exists, as does a later copy.

Valencia was a friend of Góngora and the first to write criticism of his poetry. On 11 May 1613, Góngora sent him copies of his poems Polifemo and Soledades. The latter's response, the Carta a Góngora en censura de sus poesías, is dated 30 June 1613 at Madrid. Two different autograph versions of the letter survive and it is not certain which one was the one sent.

== Bibliography ==
- Barrientos Grandon, Javier (2018). "Valencia, Melchor de". Diccionario biográfico español. Real Academia de la Historia.
- Gambin, Felice, ed. (2013). Pedro de Valencia: Trattato sui moriscos di Spagna. Edizioni ETS.
- Jones, J. A. (1976). "Arias Montano and Pedro de Valencia: Three Further Documents". Bibliothèque d'Humanisme et Renaissance. 38 (2): 351–355. JSTOR 20675583.
- Magnier, Grace (2010). Pedro de Valencia and the Catholic Apologists of the Expulsion of the Moriscos: Visions of Christianity and Kingship. Brill.
- Parello, Vincent, ed. (2021). Pedro de Valencia: Le Traité sur les Morisques d'Espagne. Classiques Garnier.
- Pérez López, Manuel María, ed. (1988). Pedro de Valencia, primer crítico gongorino: estudio y edición anotada de la Carta a Góngora en censura de sus poesías. Ediciones Universidad de Salamanca.
- Serrano y Sanz, Manuel (1981). Pedro de Valencia: Estudio biográficocrítico. Diputación Provincial de Badajoz.
- Suárez Sánchez de León, Juan Luis (2018). "Valencia, Pedro de". Diccionario biográfico español. Real Academia de la Historia.
