= Caecilius of Elvira =

Patron saint of Granada, Spain

Saint Caecilius
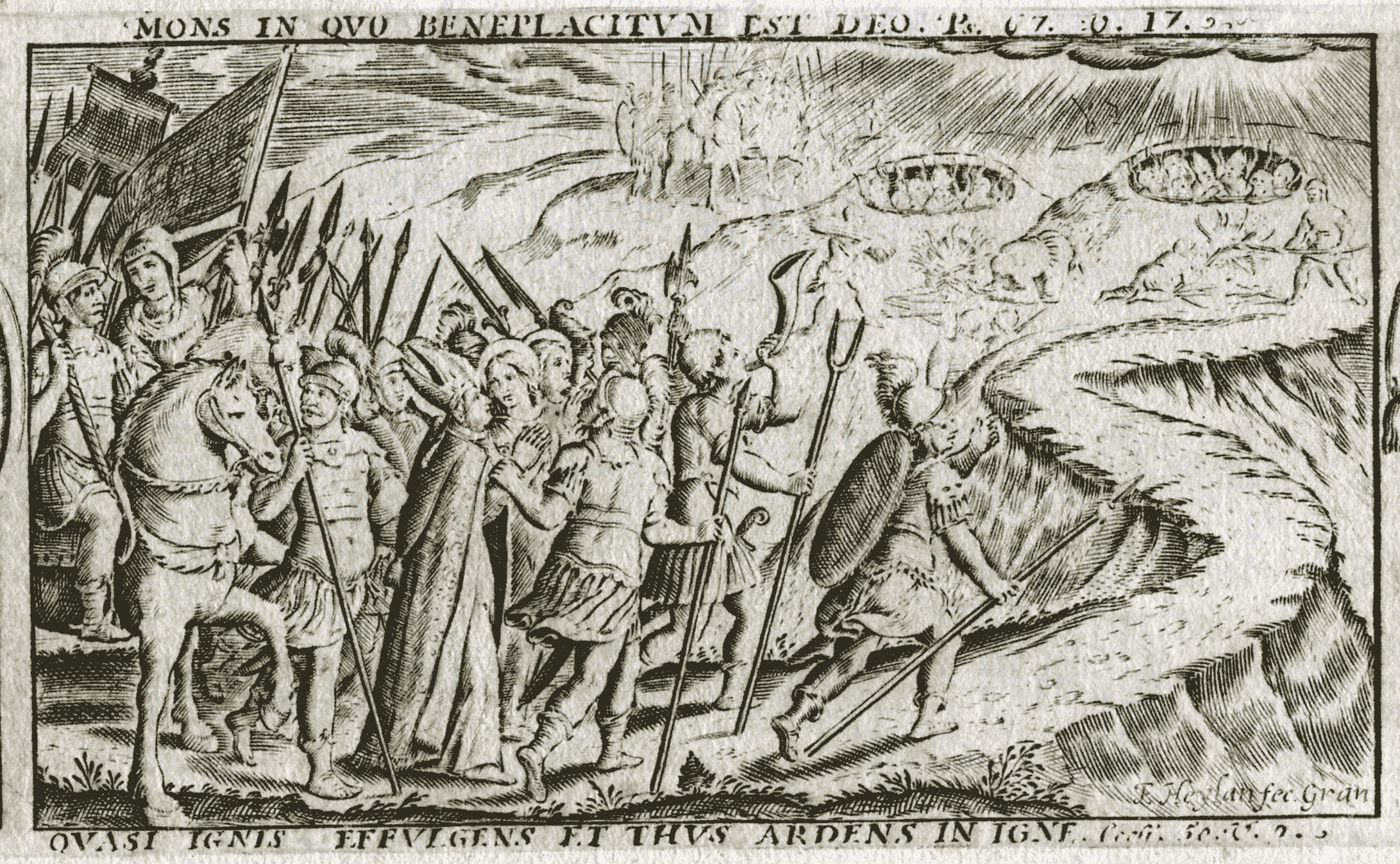
- Martyrdom of Saint Caecilius

Bishop and martyr
- Died: 1st century Elvira, Hispania Baetica
- Venerated in: Roman Catholic Church
- Feast: May 15; May 1 (with the Seven Apostolic Men); February 1 (Caecilius)
- Attributes: episcopal attire
- Patronage: Granada, Spain

Saint Caecilius (Cecil, Cecilius, Cäcilius, Spanish: San Cecilio) is venerated as the patron saint of Granada, Spain.

== Life ==
Tradition makes him a Christian missionary of the 1st century, during the Apostolic Age. Caecilius first worked as an itinerant bishop in the area of Roussillon. He then evangelized the town of Iliberri or Iliberis (Elvira/Granada), and became its first bishop. He is thus considered the founder of the archdiocese of Granada, established around 64 AD. Elvira's first bishop, according to the Glosas Emilianenses, was Caecilius. Tradition states that he wrote some didactic treatises and that he was burned to death during the reign of Nero.

He is one of the group of Seven Apostolic Men (siete varones apostólicos), seven Christian clerics ordained in Rome by Saints Peter and Paul and sent to evangelize Spain. Besides Caecilius, this group includes Sts. Hesychius, Ctesiphon, Torquatus, Euphrasius, Indaletius, and Secundius (Isicio, Cecilio, Tesifonte, Torcuato, Eufrasio, Hesiquio y Segundo). The legend probably originates from the 7th century.

== Veneration ==
Sacromonte, a neighbourhood of Granada, celebrates on the first February each year the Fiesta de San Cecilio, when large crowds gather to celebrate the city's first bishop and Granada's patron saint. The fiesta and abbey act as key instruments for the preservation, propagation and dissemination of Caecilius' legend, by which the city of Granada in the 17th century sought to redefine its historic identity, replacing its recent Moorish past with accounts of earlier Christian origins.

The legend states that the catacombs of Sacromonte are the site of Saint Cecil's martyrdom, and the abbey preserves the supposed relics of Cecil and eleven other saints' bones, ashes and the oven in which they were believed to have been burned. It also possesses the inscribed lead plaques and books, the Lead Books of Sacromonte, that were found with the supposed relics, but which were subsequently dismissed by the Holy Office as forgeries.

== See also ==
- Caecilia gens
