= Rodrigo de Cerrato =

Rodrigo de Cerrato or Rodrigo Cerratense, Rodrigo Manuel Cerratense or de Cerrato or El Cerratense (*Calzada de Calatrava, Ciudad Real, before 1259 – after 1276) was a Castilian historian and hagiographer of the second half of the 13th century.

Not much is known of his life. He was born in Calzada de Calatrava and was a Dominican friar in the convent of Santa Cruz de Segovia, one of the oldest Dominican foundations. His surname Cerratense may derive from the fact that he wrote his works in the monastery of San Pelayo de Cerrato.

He lived during the reign of Alfonso X and wrote around 1276 several Vitas sanctorum, an important hagiography that concerns various Spanish saints, including the Seven Apostolic Men. This version conserves various summaries or expansions of the biographies of the saints.

The book ends with a very short Chronicon (Crónicon), or chronicle, which runs from the birth of Christ to the death of Ferdinand III of Castile. The Crónicon corrects some dates found in the Anales toledanos, or Toledan annals. The first reference to Rodrigo de Cerrato dates from 1259 and he must have lived until 1276, which is based on an interpretation of Crónicon by Fidel Fita.
