= Berja =

- Municipality
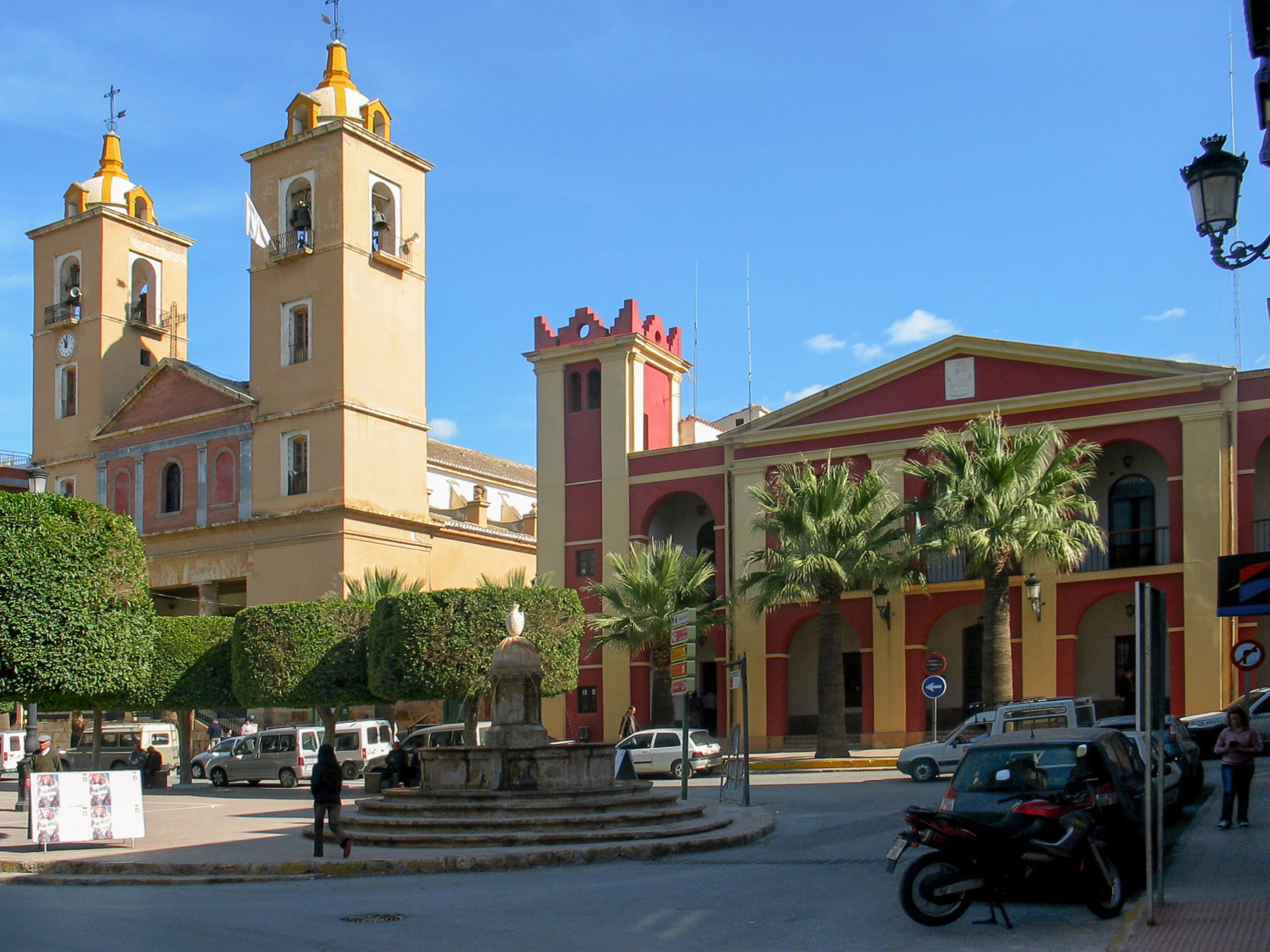
- Town hall

- Flag Seal

- Location within Spain Location within Andalusia Location within Province of Almería
- Coordinates: 36°50′47.0″N 2°57′07.4″W
- Country: Spain
- A. community: Andalucía
- Province: Almería

Government
  - Mayor: José Carlos Lupión

Area
  - Total: 185.8 km^{2} (71.7 sq mi)

Population (January 1, 2021)
  - Total: 12,623
  - Density: 67.94/km^{2} (176.0/sq mi)
- Time zone: UTC+01:00
- Postal code: 04760
- MCN: 04029
- Website: Official website

Berja (Spanish pronunciation: [ˈbeɾxa]) is a municipality, former bishopric and Latin titular see in Almería province, in the autonomous community of Andalusia, southern Spain.

It is located on the south-eastern slope of the Sierra de Gádor, 16 km north-east of Adra.

== History ==
Historical population
Year	Pop.	±%
1999	13,317	—
2000	13,279	−0.3%
2001	13,331	+0.4%
2002	13,405	+0.6%
2003	13,670	+2.0%
2004	13,924	+1.9%
2005	14,249	+2.3%
Source: INE (Spain)

Berja may have Phoenician or Iberian origins; it was known to the Romans as Vergis or Vergium, and it was part of the province of Baetica. There are Roman remains in the Villa Vieja: an amphitheater and an aqueduct, and mosaics whose style and production are similar to those found in Pompeii and Herculaneum.

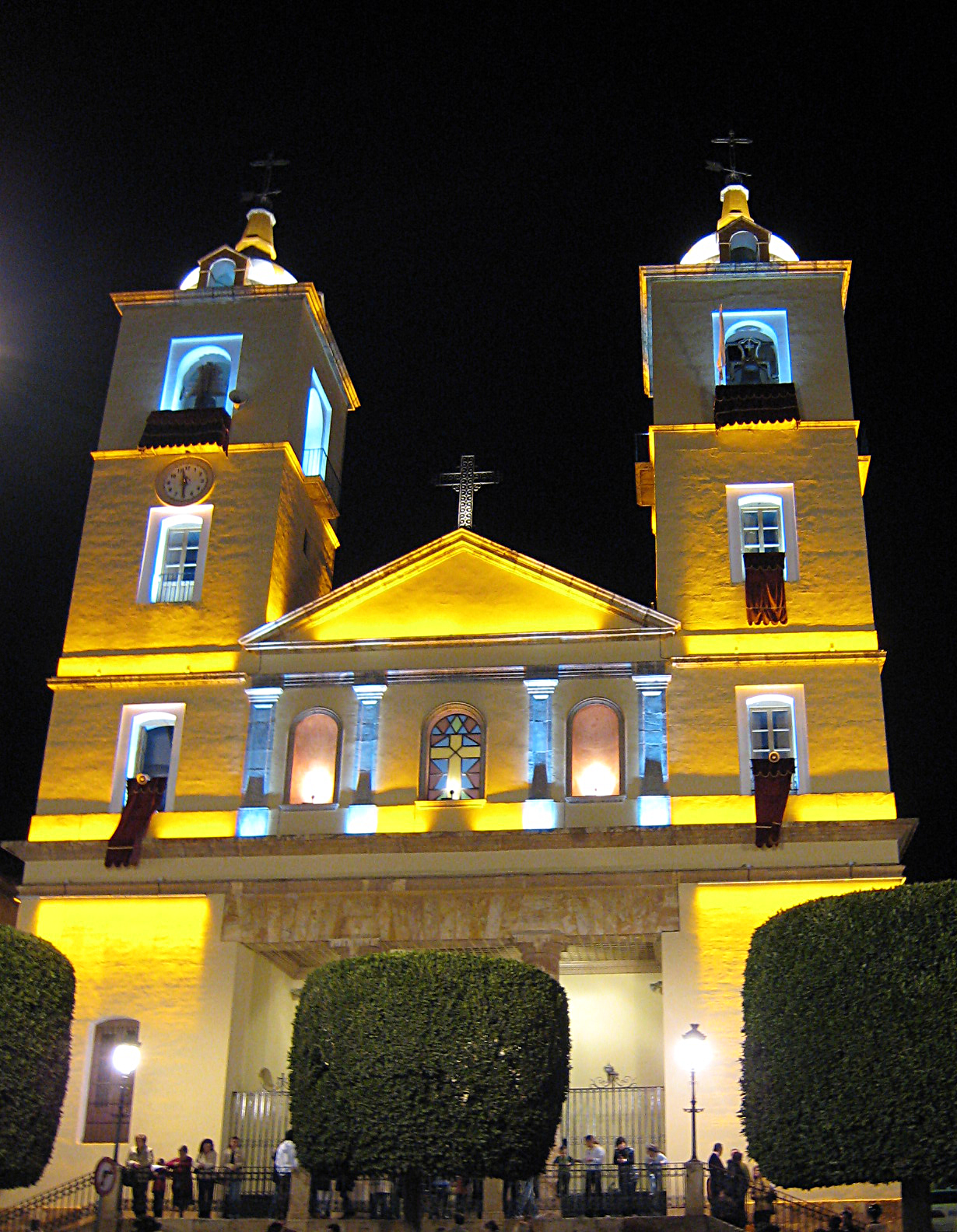
Church of Berja

Saint Ctesiphon (San Tesifón), the patron saint of the town, is said to have preached in the area in the first century, bringing Christianity to the town. From this era are conserved coins, crosses and a sarcophagus found in the neighborhood of Alcaudique, which is now in the National Archaeological Museum (Museo Arqueológico Nacional). A reproduction exists in the Museum of Almería.

The site suffered an earthquake in the fifth century, and the Roman town subsequently dissolved into various smaller communities, one of which –Berja- became the dominant one. After the Moorish invasion of Iberia in the eighth century, the town was known as Berja, and a fortress was built in the town. Remains of Moorish baths can still be seen in the neighborhood of Benejí.

It was occupied by Christian forces in 1489 during the Reconquista. The Morisco Revolt in 1568 led to many deaths in Berja, which was nearly depopulated after the end of the uprising. In the autumn of 1588 two hermits arrived in Berja named Domingo de San Juan and Juan de Santa María, who founded in the depopulated area of Pixnela the sanctuary dedicated to a patroness of Berja: the Virgen de Gádor (Virgin of Gádor, also in Almeria province).

Berja would be administered from Ugíjar until October 29, 1753, when it was allowed to have its own mayor, forming part of the administrative area of Las Alpujarras, within the old kingdom of Granada. On August 25, 1804, another earthquake destroyed much of the town.

Under the regency of Maria Christina of Austria, Javier de Burgos used his influence to turn Spain's antiquated administrative system into a provincial one, advocating the need for a centralized government. In 1833, Las Alpujarras was divided into two zones: one remained part of the province of Granada, Berja fell within the other which was part of the province of Almería.

Exploitation of the lead mines in Berja began in the 19th century, and the city consequently flourished during this time.

Once lying within Berja's limits was a "local autonomous entity", the community of Balanegra; however, by official decree from the Government of Andalusia on 2 June 2015, published in a bulletin 17 days later, the southernmost section of Berja's municipal area, which included Balanegra, was severed and Balanegra's new municipal administration was founded. The territorial transfer left Berja landlocked.

== Ecclesiastical history ==
Saint Ctesiphon (San Tesifón), patron saint of the town, is said to have preached in the area in the first century, bringing Christianity to Roman Vergi(um). It was made a bishopric around 500, but that was suppressed circa 711, due to the Moorish conquest. No resident incumbents available.

=== Titular see ===
In 1969 the diocese was nominally restored as Titular bishopric named Vergi (Curiate Italian), Latin adjective Vergen(sis).

It had the following incumbents, so far of the fitting Episcopal (lowest) rank:

- Angelo Calabretta (1970.06.27 – death 1975.01.04) on emeritate as former Bishop of Noto (Italy) (1936.07.16 – 1970.06.27)
- Paul Marie Nguyễn Minh Nhật (1975.07.16 – 1988.02.22) as Coadjutor Bishop of Xuân Lôc (Vietnam) (1975.07.16 – 1988.02.22), later succeeding as Bishop of Xuân Lôc (1988.02.22 – retired 2004.09.30), also President of Episcopal Conference of Vietnam (1990 – 1995), died 2007
- Antonín Liška, Redemptorists (C.SS.R.) (1988.05.19 – 1991.08.28) as Auxiliary Bishop of Praha (Prague, Czech Republic) (1988.05.19 – 1991.08.28); later Bishop of České Budějovice (Czech Republic) (1991.08.28 – retired 2002.09.25), died 2003
- Gerhard Jakob (1993.12.12 – 1998.05.04) as Auxiliary Bishop of Trier (western Germany) (1993.12.12 – death 1998.05.04)
- Salvador Emilio Riverón Cortina (1999.04.24 – death 2004.02.22) as Auxiliary Bishop of La Habana (Havana, Cuba) (1999.04.24 – 2004.02.22)
- Ángel Rubio Castro (2004.10.21 – resigned? 2007.11.03) as Auxiliary Bishop of Toledo (Spain) (2004.10.21 – 2007.11.03); later Bishop of Segovia (Spain) (2007.11.03 – death 2014.11.12)
- Santiago Gómez Sierra (2010.12.18 – 2020.06.15) as Auxiliary Bishop of Sevilla (Seville, Spain); later Bishop of Huelva (Spain) (2020.06.15 – ...).
- Francisco José Prieto Fernández (2021.01.28 – 2023.04.01), Auxiliary Bishop of Santiago de Compostela (Spain).
- José Antonio Álvarez Sánchez (2024.04.23 – 2025.10.01), Auxiliary Bishop of Madrid.

== Economy ==
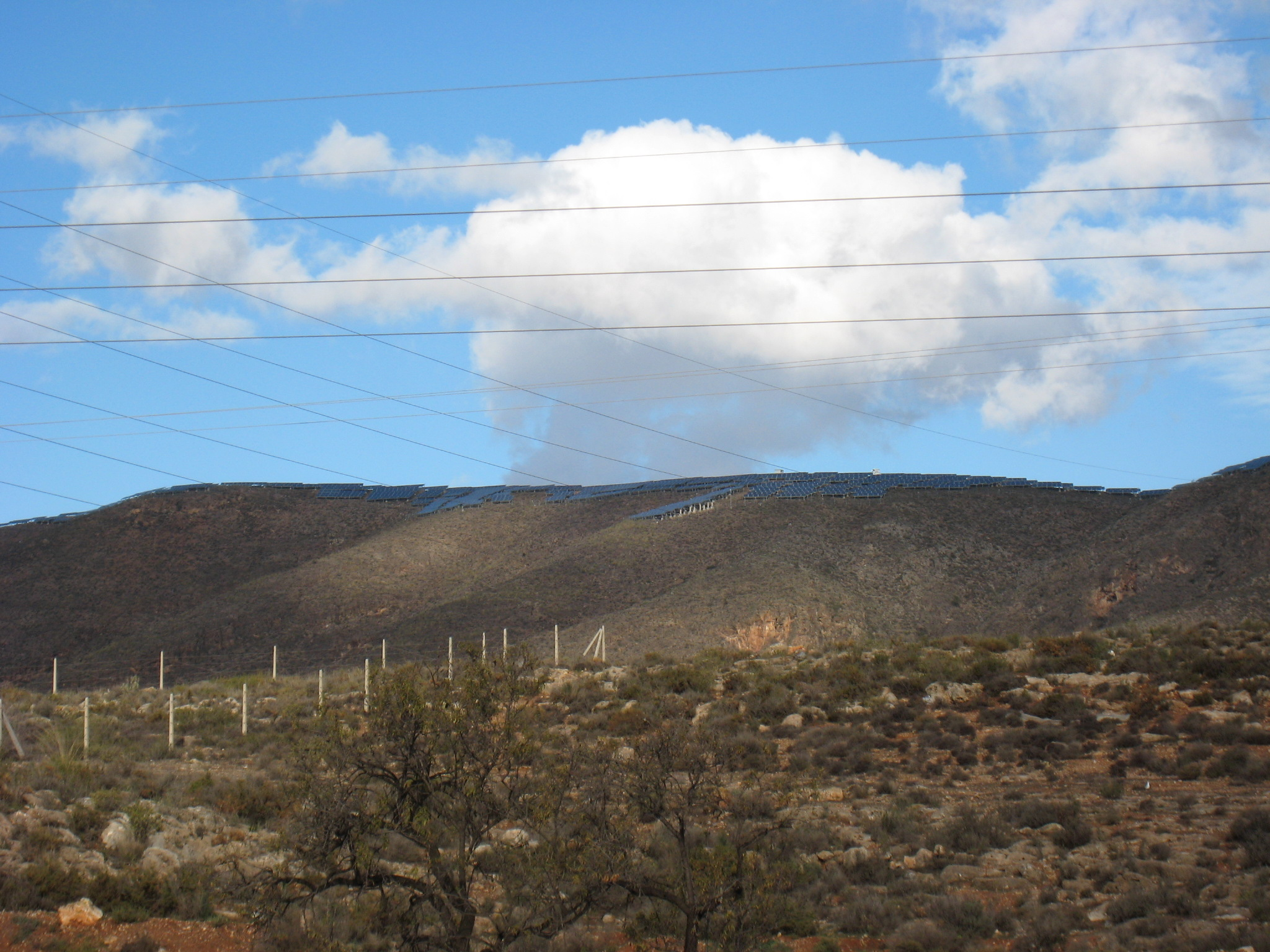
Solar plant on the peak of Montivel mountain

The city was known for its former lead mines. From the 16th century, the city began production of a wine whose cultivation was commercialized in the 19th century under the brand name Salobra. The city's solar plant opened on December 12, 2007 on the peak of the mountain Montivel.

== Climate ==
Berja has one of the sunniest, warmest and driest climates in Mediterranean Europe. It is located in a semi-arid climate zone.

== See also ==
- List of municipalities in Almería

== Sources and external links ==
- (in Spanish) Official website
- (in Spanish)
- Berja - Sistema de Información Multiterritorial de Andalucía
- Patronato municipal de deportes de Berja
- Gcatholic - (titular) bishopric Vergi, with Google satellite photo
