= Torquatus of Acci =

First-century bishop of Guadix, Spain

Saint Torquatus of Acci
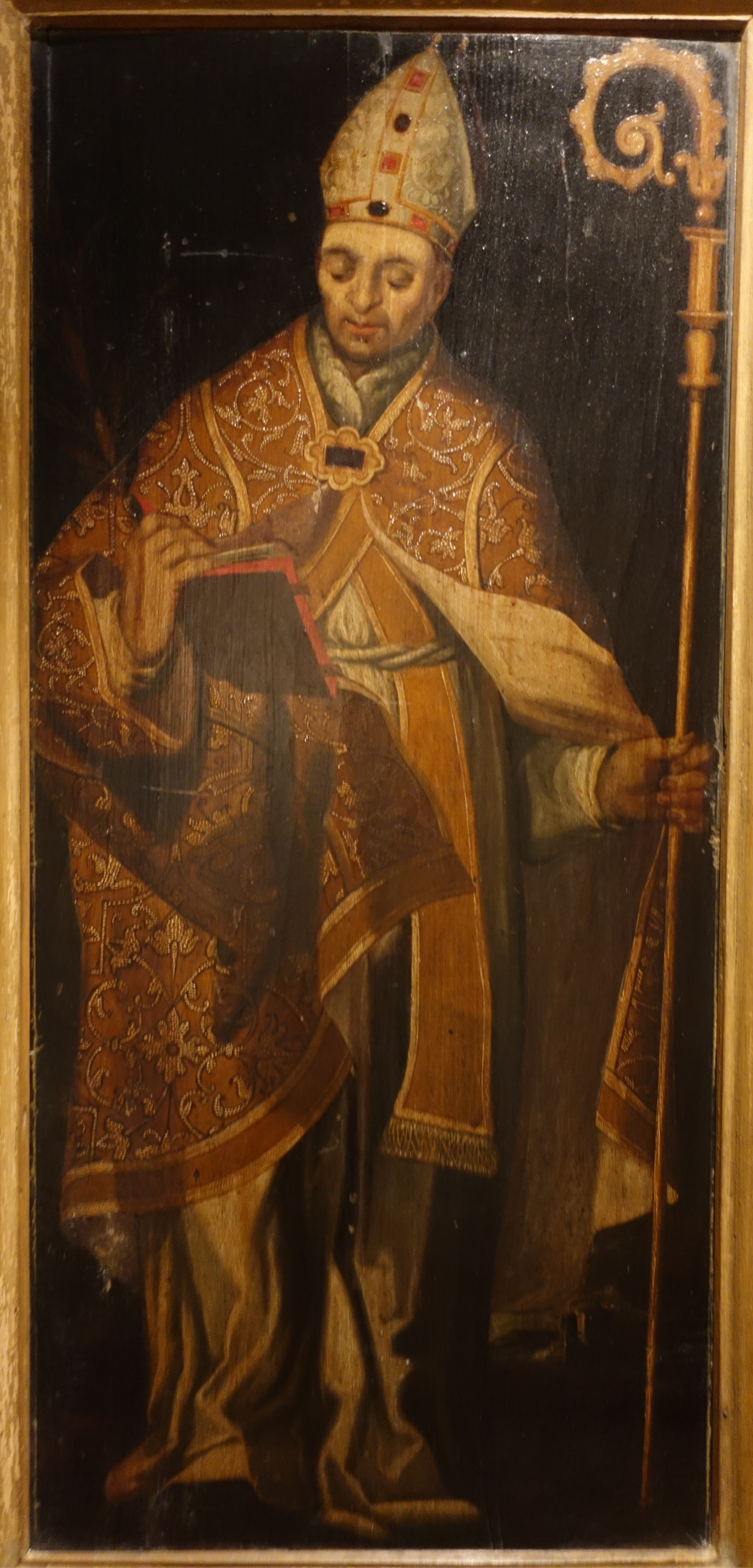

Bishop
- Died: 1st century Guadix, Spain
- Venerated in: Roman Catholic Church, Eastern Orthodox Church
- Major shrine: Guadix Cathedral
- Feast: May 15, May 1 (with Seven Apostolic Men); June 14 (Guadix)
- Patronage: Guadix

Saint Torquatus (Spanish: San Torcuato) is venerated as the patron saint of Guadix, Spain and San Trocado, Allariz. Tradition makes him a Christian missionary of the 1st century, during the Apostolic Age. He evangelized the town of Acci, identified as Guadix, and became its first bishop.

He is one of the group of Seven Apostolic Men (siete varones apostólicos), seven Christian clerics ordained in Rome by Saints Peter and Paul and sent to evangelize Hispania. Besides Torquatus, this group includes Sts. Hesychius, Caecilius, Ctesiphon, Euphrasius, Indaletius, and Secundius (Isicio/Hesiquio, Cecilio, Tesifonte, Eufrasio, Indalecio y Segundo).

It is not certain whether Torquatus was a martyr or confessor of the faith.

== Veneration ==
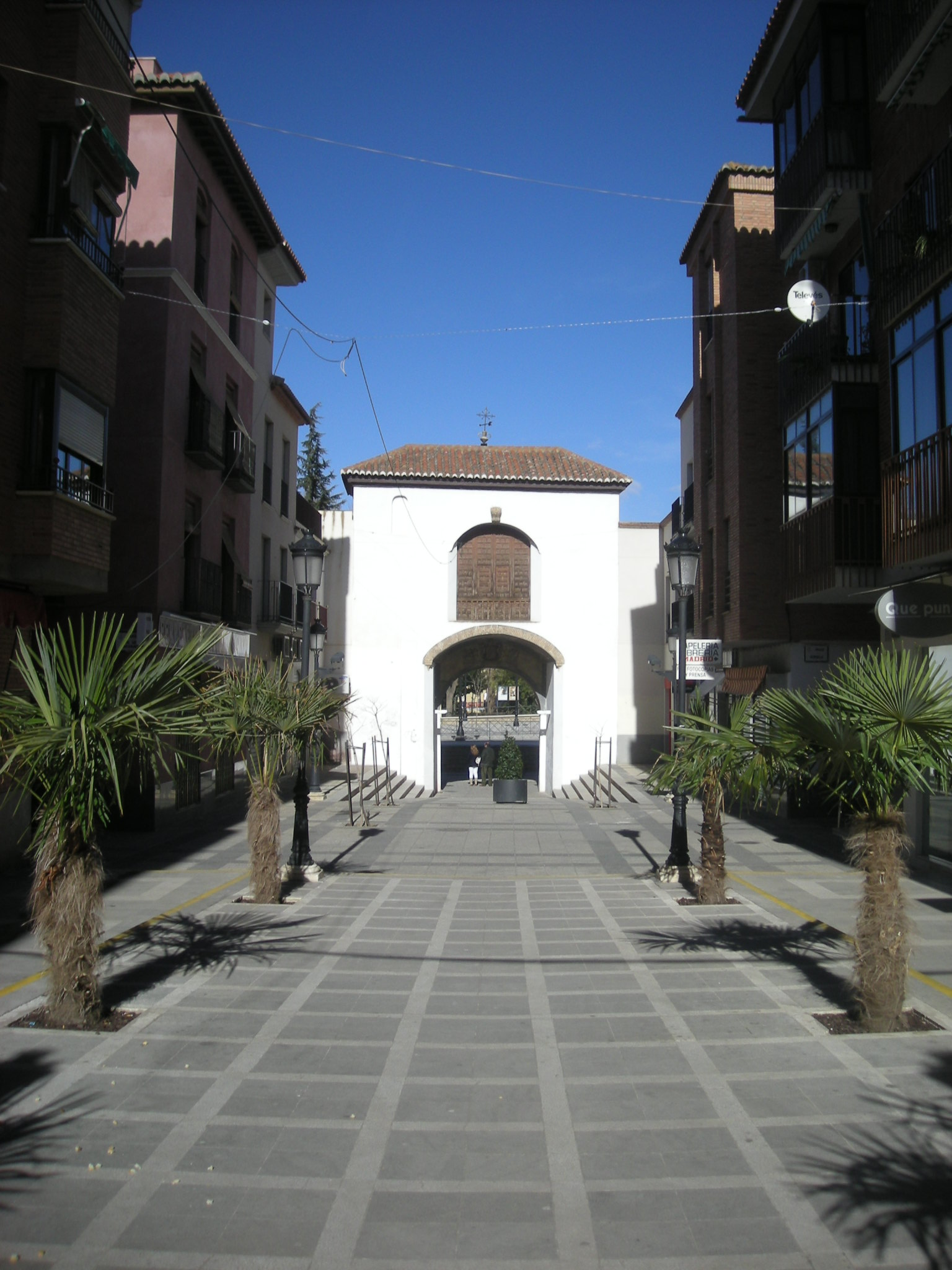
The Gate of Saint Torquatus (Puerta de San Torcuato) in Guadix.

Torquatus' relics were rediscovered in the 8th century during the Moorish invasion of Spain, in a church built in his honor, near the Limia River.

Torquatus' relics and those of Euphrasius were translated to Galicia. Torquatus’ relics remained for a long time in the Visigothic church of Santa Comba de Bande (Ourense) (Santa Comba de Baños).

In the 10th century, Torquatus' relics were translated to San Salvador de Celanova (in Celanova, Ourense).

In 1592, the sepulcher at Celanova was opened and part of Torquatus’ relics was distributed to Guadix, Compostela, and Ourense, and also to El Escorial, and to the Jesuit college at Guadix, and in 1627, to Granada. The relics that remained in San Salvador de Celanova were placed in the main chapel of the church of the monastery, together with those of Saint Rudesind, the monastery's founder.

The cathedral of Guadix conserves three relics associated with Saint Torquatus: his arm, his jawbone, and his calcaneus (this last relic is not on display).

It has been theorized that Torquatus may be a Christian version of the Celtic god Bandua.
