= Seven Apostolic Men =

Seven clerics traditionally said to have brought Christianity to Spain

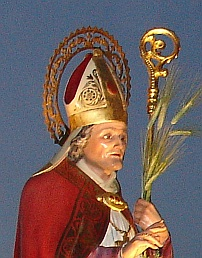
- St. Hesychius, one of the Seven Apostolic Men

Martyrs
- Born: Uncertain, perhaps Spain, or some other part of the Roman Empire
- Died: ~47 AD; Spain
- Venerated in: Roman Catholic Church; Eastern Orthodox Church
- Feast: May 1, May 15 (general); but each saint also has his own particular feast day

According to Christian tradition, the Seven Apostolic Men (siete varones apostólicos) were seven Christian clerics ordained in Rome by Saints Peter and Paul and sent to evangelize Spain. This group includes Torquatus, Caecilius, Ctesiphon, Euphrasius, Indaletius, Hesychius, and Secundius (Torcuato, Cecilio, Tesifonte, Eufrasio, Indalecio, Hesiquio y Segundo).

It is not clear whether the seven men were Romans, Greeks, or natives of Hispania.

The legend probably dates from the 8th century. The Martyrology of Lyon (806 AD) incorporated text from a fifth-century source, and the seven saints are mentioned in the Mozarabic liturgy.

According to manuscripts of the 10th century, which in turn recorded information from the 8th or 9th centuries, these seven clerics arrived at Acci (Guadix) during the celebrations in honor of Jupiter, Mercury, and Juno. The pagans chased them to the river, but the bridge collapsed miraculously and the seven men were saved. A noblewoman named Luparia, interested in their mission, hid them and converted to Christianity after building an altar in honor of John the Baptist.

The Dominican writer Rodrigo de Cerrato also wrote about the Seven Apostolic Men during the 13th century.

== The seven cities ==
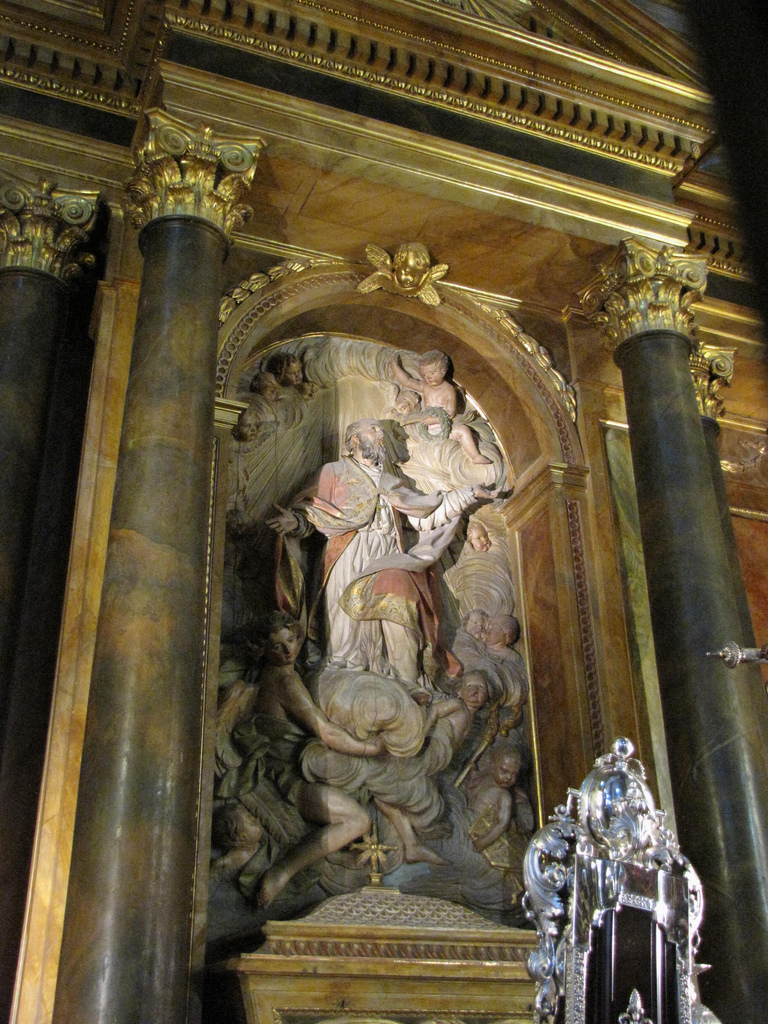
A depiction of Euphrasius, Jaén Cathedral.

The seven missionaries decided to evangelize various parts of the region of Baetica: Torquatus remained in Acci (Guadix), Ctesiphon went to Vergium or Bergi (Berja), Hesychius to Carcere (Cazorla), Indalecius went to Urci (Pechina), Secundius to Abula (identified as Ávila or Abla), Euphrasius to Iliturgis (a site near Andújar), and Caecilius to Iliberri or Iliberis (Elvira/Granada).

The identification of these places is imprecise: other sources state that Carcere or Carcesi is not Cazorla but Cieza, and that Urci is Torre de Villaricos, and Iliturgis is Cuevas de Lituergo. The only identification considered certain is that of Iliberis with Elvira, seat of the Synod of Elvira, whose first bishop, according to the Glosas Emilianenses, was Caecilius.

== Associations with Saint James the Great (Santiago) ==
Traditions attributed to them actions other say were carried out James the Great. An author of the ninth century linked this tradition of the Seven Apostolic Men with that of Saint James the Great in a text known as Translatio S. Iacobi in Hispaniam. According to this text, seven disciples of James brought his body to the Roman province of Hispania after his martyrdom at Jerusalem. The seven disciples, pursued by a pagan king in Spain, hid in a fountain protected by a crypt; when the pagan soldiers entered the crypt, it collapsed, killing them all. A woman, named Luparia, converted to Christianity and had James' body placed in a building previously dedicated to the Roman gods. This tradition also states that three of these disciples, Torquatus, Athanasius (a name that does not correspond to the usual list of names of these seven name), and Ctesiphon, were buried with James.

== Veneration ==
There are statues of all seven saints, in addition one of Saint Peter, at the Cathedral of Guadix.

Pope John Paul II, during his first trip to Spain in 1982, remarked that Spain "was conquered for the faith by the missionary zeal of the Seven Apostolic Men."

Saint Euphrasius' relics were taken to Santa María de Mao in the diocese of Lugo.

== Ctesiphon ==
Saint Ctesiphon (Spanish: San Tesifonte, Tesifón) or Ctesiphon of Vergium is venerated as patron saint (besides Mary, Virgen de Gádor) of Berja, Andalusia, southern Spain. Tradition makes him a Christian missionary of the 1st century, during the Apostolic Age. He evangelized the town of Bergi, Vergi(s), or Vergium, identified as Berja, and is said to have become its first bishop, but the Diocese of Vergi was probably only founded around 500.

Ctesiphon's relics purportedly lie in the catacombs of Sacromonte Abbey in Granada, along with those of Hesychius of Cazorla and Caecilius of Elvira.

== Torquatus' relics ==
Torquatus' relics were rediscovered in the eighth century during the Moorish invasion of Spain, in a church built in his honor, near the Limia River.

Torquatus' relics and those of Euphrasius were translated to Galicia. Torquatus' relics remained for a long time in the Visigothic church of Santa Comba de Bande.

In the 10th century, Torquatus' relics were translated to San Salvador de Celanova (in Celanova, Ourense).

In 1592, the sepulcher was opened and part of Torquatus' relics were distributed to Guadix, Compostela, and Ourense, and also to El Escorial, and to the Jesuit college at Guadix, and in 1627, to Granada. The relics that remained in San Salvador de Celanova were placed in the main chapel of the church of the monastery, together with those of Saint Rudesind, the monastery's founder.

The Cathedral of Guadix conserves three relics associated with Saint Torquatus: his arm, his jawbone, and his calcaneus (this last relic is not on display).

== Sources ==
- Diccionario de Historia de España. Madrid: Istmo, 2003.
