= Indaletius =

Saint Indaletius

Martyr
- Died: 1st century Urci (Pechina)
- Venerated in: Catholic Church, Eastern Orthodox Church
- Feast: May 15
- Attributes: miter, staff and a book in his hands
- Patronage: Almería, Spain; diocese of Almería; Pechina

Saint Indaletius (Spanish: San Indalecio) is venerated as the patron saint of Almería, Spain. Tradition makes him a Christian missionary of the 1st century, during the Apostolic Age. He evangelized the town of Urci (today Pechina), near the present-day city of Almería, and became its first bishop. He may have been martyred at Urci.

He is one of the group of Seven Apostolic Men (siete varones apostólicos), seven Christian clerics ordained in Rome by Saints Peter and Paul and sent to evangelize Spain. Besides Indaletius, this group includes Sts. Torquatus, Caecilius, Ctesiphon, Euphrasius, Hesychius, and Secundius (Torcuato, Cecilio, Tesifonte, Eufrasio, Hesiquio y Segundo).

== Veneration ==
In 1084, emissaries of Sancho Ramírez, King of Aragon and Navarre translated Indaletius’ relics to San Juan de la Peña near Jaca against the will of the Christian communities in Seville and Urci. Some of his relics still rest in an urn in the main altar of the cathedral of Jaca.

Other relics associated with Indaletius are claimed to have been placed below the altar of the Cathedral of Almería and at the Conciliar Seminary of San Indalecio de Almería (Seminario Conciliar de San Indalecio de Almería).
