= Secundus of Abula =

Saint Secundus of Abla
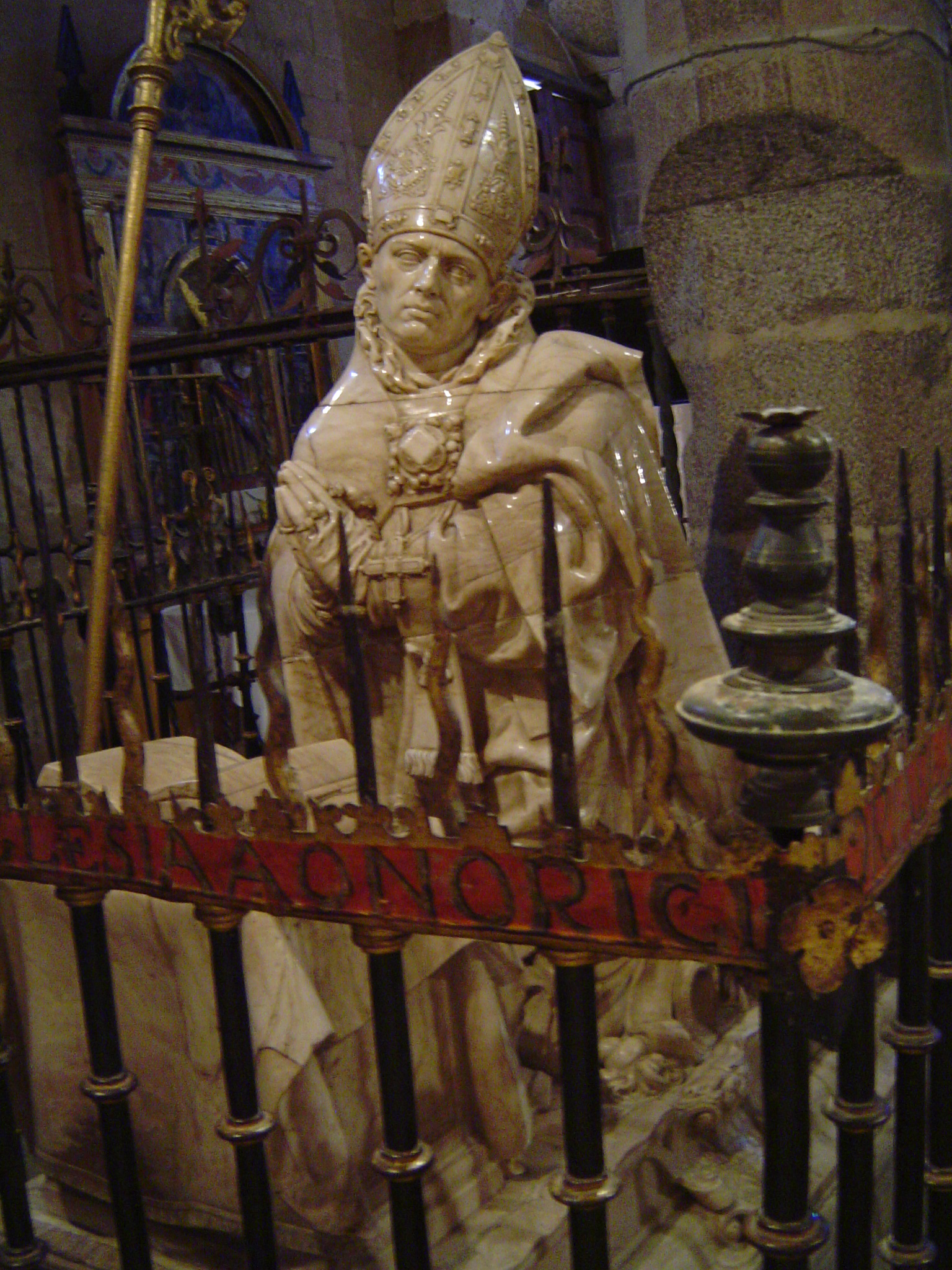
- Tomb of Saint Secundus (San Segundo). Hermitage of San Segundo, Ávila.

Martyr
- Died: 1st century Abula, Spain
- Venerated in: Catholic Church, Eastern Orthodox Church
- Major shrine: Hermitage of San Segundo, Ávila
- Feast: May 15; May 2
- Attributes: episcopal attire
- Patronage: Abla, Spain; Ávila, Spain

Saint Secundus or Secundius (Spanish: San Segundo) is venerated as a Christian missionary and martyr of the 1st century, during the Apostolic Age. He evangelized the town of Abula, which has been identified as either Abla or Ávila, and became its first bishop.

The ancient town of Abula is mentioned by Ptolemy in his Geographia (II 6, 60) as located in the Iberian region of Bastetania. It is said to be one of the first cities in Hispania that was Christianized, specifically by Secundus. Ávila may have been the ancient Obila and Abula may have been the present town of Abla.

Secundus is one of the group of Seven Apostolic Men (siete varones apostólicos), Christian clerics ordained in Rome by Saints Peter and Paul and sent to evangelize Spain. Beside Secundius, this group includes Saints Hesychius, Caecilius, Torquatus, Euphrasius, Indaletius, and Ctesiphon.
