= Hesychius of Cazorla =

Patron saint of Cazorla, Spain

Saint Hesychius
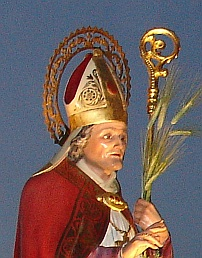

Martyr
- Died: 1st century Cazorla, Spain
- Venerated in: Roman Catholic Church, Eastern Orthodox Church
- Feast: May 15, March 1
- Patronage: Cazorla, Spain

Saint Hesychius (Spanish: San Isicio, San Hesiquio, San Exiquio; French: Saint Hisque) is venerated as the patron saint of Cazorla, Spain.

He is one of the group of Seven Apostolic Men (siete varones apostólicos), seven Christian clerics ordained in Rome by Peter and Paul, and sent to evangelize Spain. Besides Hesychius, this group includes Torquatus, Caecilius, Ctesiphon, Euphrasius, Indaletius, and Secundius (Torcuato, Cecilio, Tesifonte, Eufrasio, Hesiquio y Segundo). The legend probably dates from the 7th century. In reality, there is reason to assume that the seven must have lived in the 2nd century.

Tradition makes him a Christian missionary of the 1st century, during the Apostolic Age. He evangelized the town of Carcere, Carteia, or Carcesi, identified as Cazorla, became its first bishop, and was martyred there by stoning at La Pedriza. However, Migne mentions Gibraltar, where he is said to have died "in peace", i.e. not as a martyr.

Tradition also says that Hesychius (or Isicio) gave to the residents of Cabra a statue of the Virgin carved by St. Luke. Nuestra Señora de la Sierra, which actually dates from the end of the 13th century, is located in the Santuario de Nuestra Señora de la Sierra just outside Cabra. It is one of the oldest and most venerated devotions in the province of Córdoba.

The identification of the places where they are said to have evangelized is imprecise: sources also state that Carcere or Carcesi is not Cazorla but Cieza.

Hesychius is the patron saint of Cazorla and of Jaen. In Cazorla, Hesychius it is commemorated on May 15, and elsewhere in Spain on March 1. There is a statue of Hesychius in the cathedral of Guadix.
