= Abla =

Place in Andalusia, Spain

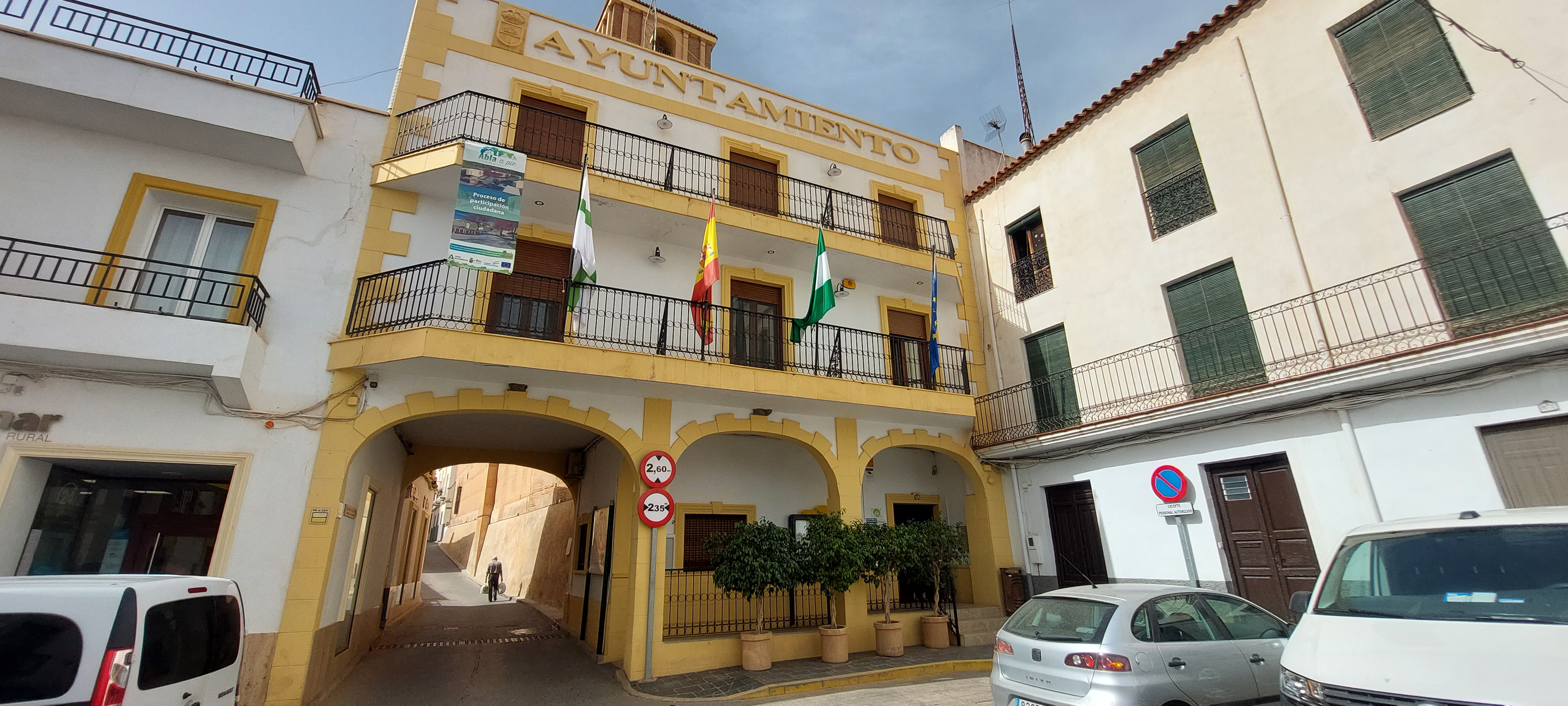
- Town hall

- Flag Coat of arms

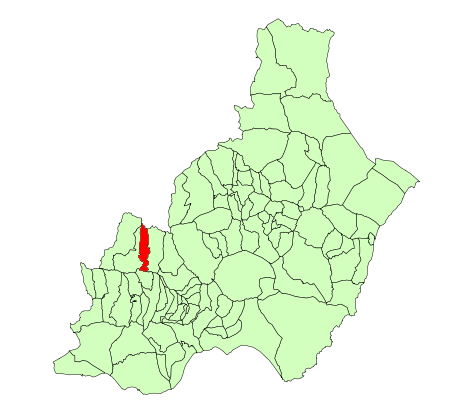

- Location within Spain
- Coordinates: 37°8′33″N 2°46′38″W
- Country: Spain
- Community: Andalusia
- Province: Almería

Government
  - Mayor: Antonio Manuel Ortiz Bono (PSOE-A) (2015–2019)

Area
  - Total: 45.24 km^{2} (17.47 sq mi)
- Elevation: 861 m (2,825 ft)

Population (2025-01-01)
  - Total: 1,268
  - Density: 28.03/km^{2} (72.59/sq mi)
- Demonym: Abulense
- Time zone: UTC+1 (CET)
  - Summer (DST): UTC+2 (CEST)

Abla is a municipality, former bishopric and Latin Catholic titular see in Almería province, in Andalusia, southeast Spain.

== History ==
It is considered to be the Abula mentioned by Ptolemy in his Geographia (II 6, 60) as located in the Iberian region of Bastetania.

Another candidate for identification with ancient Abula is Ávila, which may instead have been the ancient Obila.

== Ecclesiastical history ==
Abula is said to be one of the first cities in Hispania that were Christianized, specifically by Saint Secundus, one of the group of Seven Apostolic Men (siete varones apostólicos), Christian clerics ordained in Rome by Saints Peter and Paul and sent to evangelize Spain.

Little is known of a second bishop of Abula, called Iulius, possibly his successor, living around 100 AD. No other incumbents were recorded.

=== Titular see ===
No longer a residential see, Abula is today listed by the Catholic Church as a Latin titular bishopric since the diocese was nominally restored in 1969.

It has had the following incumbents, so far of the fitting episcopal (lowest) rank:

- Javier Osés Flamarique (11 October 1969 – 28 February 1977) as auxiliary bishop of Huesca (Aragon, Spain) (11 October 1969 – 28 February 1977) and next apostolic administrator sede plena of Huesca (1971 – 19 May 1973), then apostolic administrator of Huesca (19 May 1973 – 28 February 1977); later Bishop of Huesca (28 February 1977 – death 24 August 2001)
- Charles McDonald Renfrew (5 May 1977 – death 27 February 1992) as auxiliary bishop of Glasgow (Scotland, UK) (5 May 1977 – 27 February 1992)
- Alojz Uran (16 December 1992 – 25 October 2004) as auxiliary bishop of Ljubljana (Slovenia) (16 December 1992 – 25 October 2004); later succeeded as Metropolitan Archbishop of Ljubljana (25 October 2004 – retired 28 November 2009), president of Episcopal Conference of Slovenia (16 March 2007 – 28 November 2009)
- Salvador Giménez Valls (11 May 2005 – 21 May 2009) as auxiliary bishop of Valencia (southern Spain) (11 May 2005 – 21 May 2009) and apostolic administrator of Menorca (Balearic Spain) (21 September 2008 – 21 May 2009); later succeeded as Bishop of Menorca (21 May 2009 – 28 July 2015), then Bishop of Lleida (Spain) (28 July 2015 – ...)
- Giorgio Corbellini (3 July 2009 – ...), President of Labour Office of the Apostolic See (3 July 2009 – ...), President of Disciplinary Commission of the Roman Curia (11 May 2010 – ...), president ad interim of Financial Information Authority (30 January 2014 – 19 November 2014), supplementary member of College for the review of appeals by clergy accused of delicta graviora (21 January 2015 – ...); also was, even previously, president of Personnel Commission of the Governatorate of the Vatican City State (22 February 2001 – 3 September 2011), vice secretary general of Governorate of the Vatican City State (22 February 2001 – 3 September 2011).

== Demographics ==
From:INE Archiv

Historical population
Year	Pop.	±%
1999	1,519	—
2000	1,516	−0.2%
2001	1,517	+0.1%
2002	1,529	+0.8%
2003	1,480	−3.2%
2004	1,482	+0.1%
2005	1,512	+2.0%
2006	1,505	−0.5%
2007	1,514	+0.6%
2008	1,503	−0.7%
2009	1,504	+0.1%
2010	1,463	−2.7%
2011	1,480	+1.2%
2012	1,465	−1.0%
2013	1,422	−2.9%
2014	1,426	+0.3%
2015	1,342	−5.9%
2016	1,294	−3.6%
2017	1,267	−2.1%
2018	1,235	−2.5%
2019	1,249	+1.1%
2020	1,248	−0.1%
Source: INE (Spain)

== See also ==
- List of Catholic dioceses in Spain, Andorra, Ceuta and Gibraltar
- List of municipalities in Almería
