= Euphrasius of Illiturgis =

Saint Euphrasius of Illiturgis
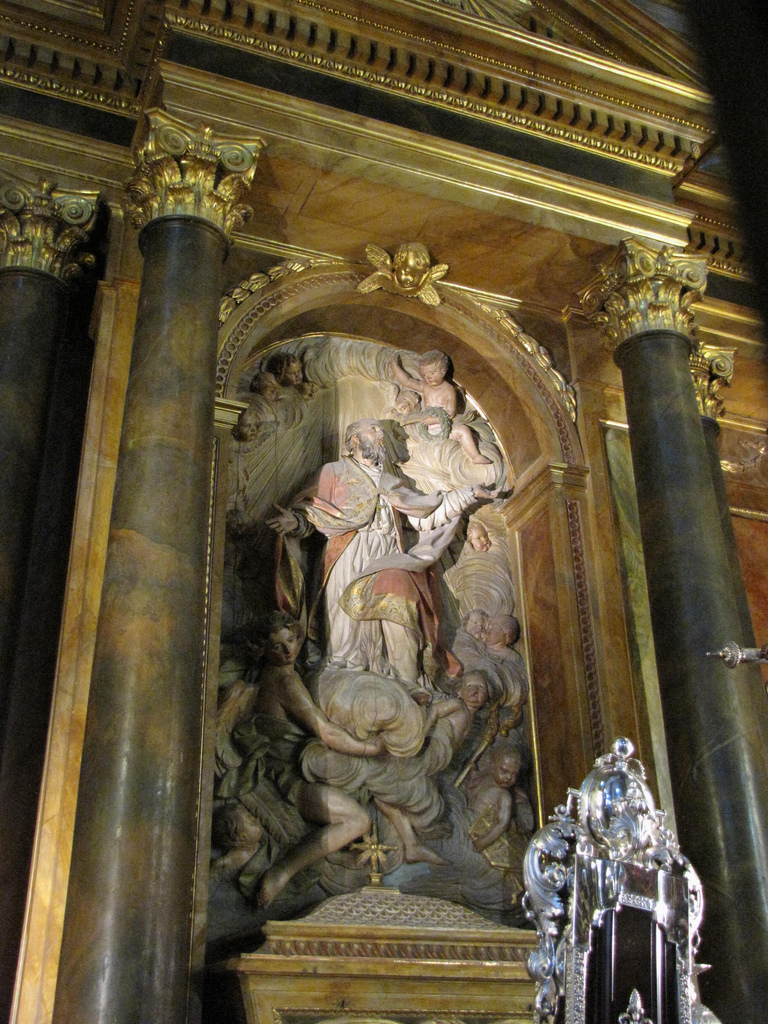
- Saint Euphrasius, altarpiece at Jaén Cathedral, 18th century

Bishop and martyr
- Died: 1st century Illiturgis, Spain
- Venerated in: Roman Catholic Church
- Major shrine: Santa María do Mao, Galicia, Spain
- Feast: May 15; March 13
- Attributes: episcopal attire
- Patronage: diocese of Jaén; Andújar; Corsica; Ajaccio, Corsica

Saint Euphrasius of Illiturgis (Spanish: San Eufrasio) is venerated as a Christian missionary of the 1st century, during the Apostolic Age. Euphrasius’ diocese was traditionally associated with Illiturgis (Iliturgi), located between Bailén and Andújar. He is said to have been martyred at Illiturgis. According to tradition, he is one of the group of Seven Apostolic Men (siete varones apostólicos), seven Christian clerics ordained in Rome by Saints Peter and Paul and sent to evangelize Spain. Besides Euphrasius, this group includes Sts. Hesychius, Ctesiphon, Torquatus, Indaletius, and Secundius (Isicio, Cecilio, Tesifonte, Eufrasio, Hesiquio y Segundo).

== Veneration ==
The communal feast of the Seven Apostolic Men was celebrated in the Mozarabic liturgy.

In the 7th century, Sisebut built a church over the saint's sepulcher at Illiturgis, but during the invasion of Spain by the Moors in the 8th century, his relics were translated to the Valley of the Mao River in Galicia, in Lugo Province. He is buried in the church of Santa María do Mao, in the municipality of O Incio, near the monastery of San Xulián de Samos in Samos.

Euphrasius is also patron of Corsica and of Ajaccio; “this seems to have been due to a secondary translation of his relics.”

A relic of a kerchief found in a chapel behind the high altar of Jaén Cathedral is associated with a legend of St. Euphrasius. When Euphrasius was sent to Rome to free the Pope from Satan's temptations, it is said that he traveled to Rome in only half an hour due to the assistance of a captive goblin who helped the saint in return for some leftovers from the saint's supper. Euphrasius vanquished Satan, and was awarded with a kerchief.

Euphrasius is also associated with the cult of Our Lady of Cabeza (la Virgen de la Cabeza). According to one legend, when Saint Euphrasius came to Spain, he brought with him an image of the Virgin Mary to which he showed devotion. According to the legend, this image was given to Euphrasius by Saint Peter, and is said to have been the portrait that Saint Luke painted of the Virgin Mary.
