= Lead Books of Sacromonte =

Religious texts inscribed on lead plates from Granada, Spain

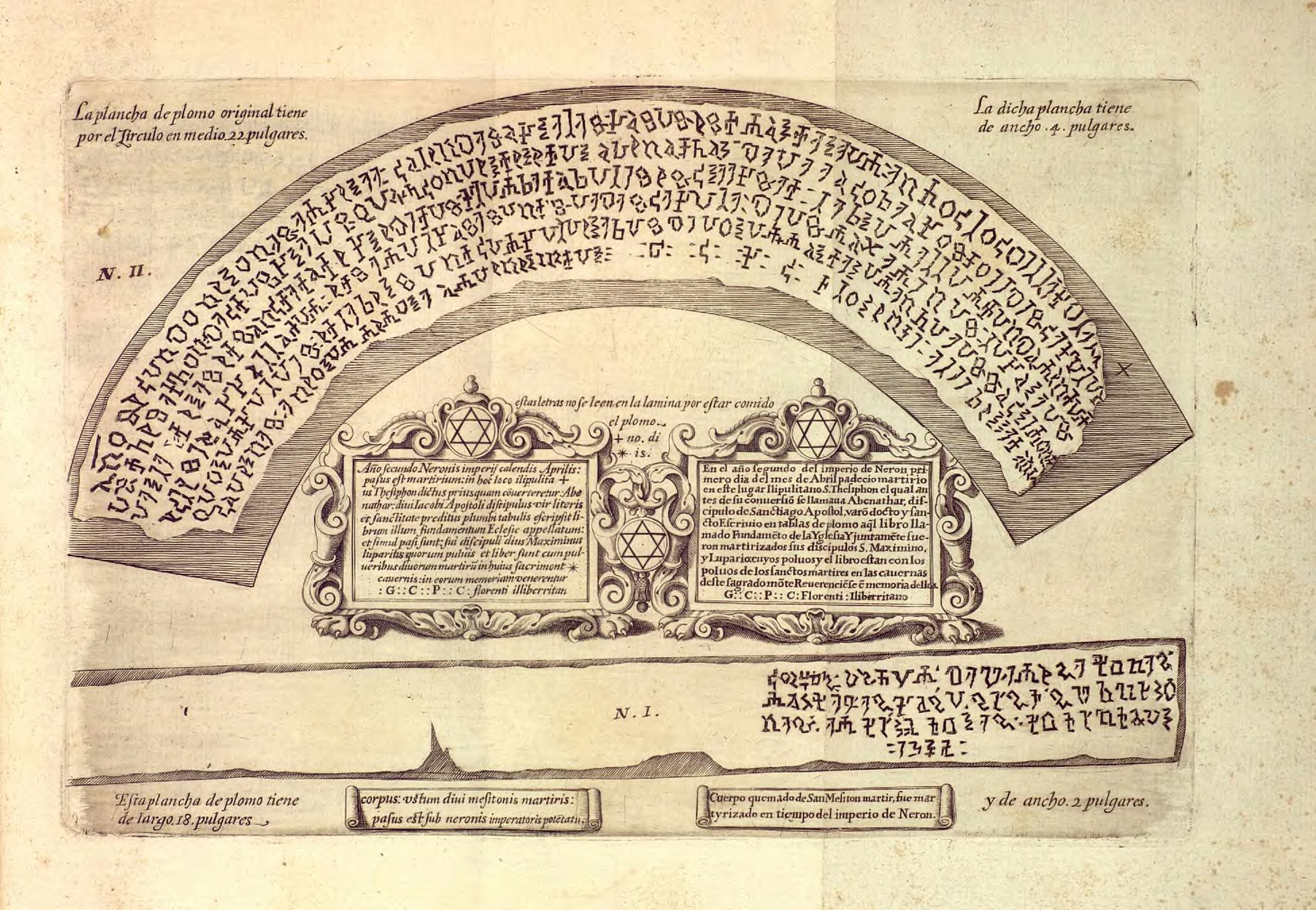
Two unrolled plates.

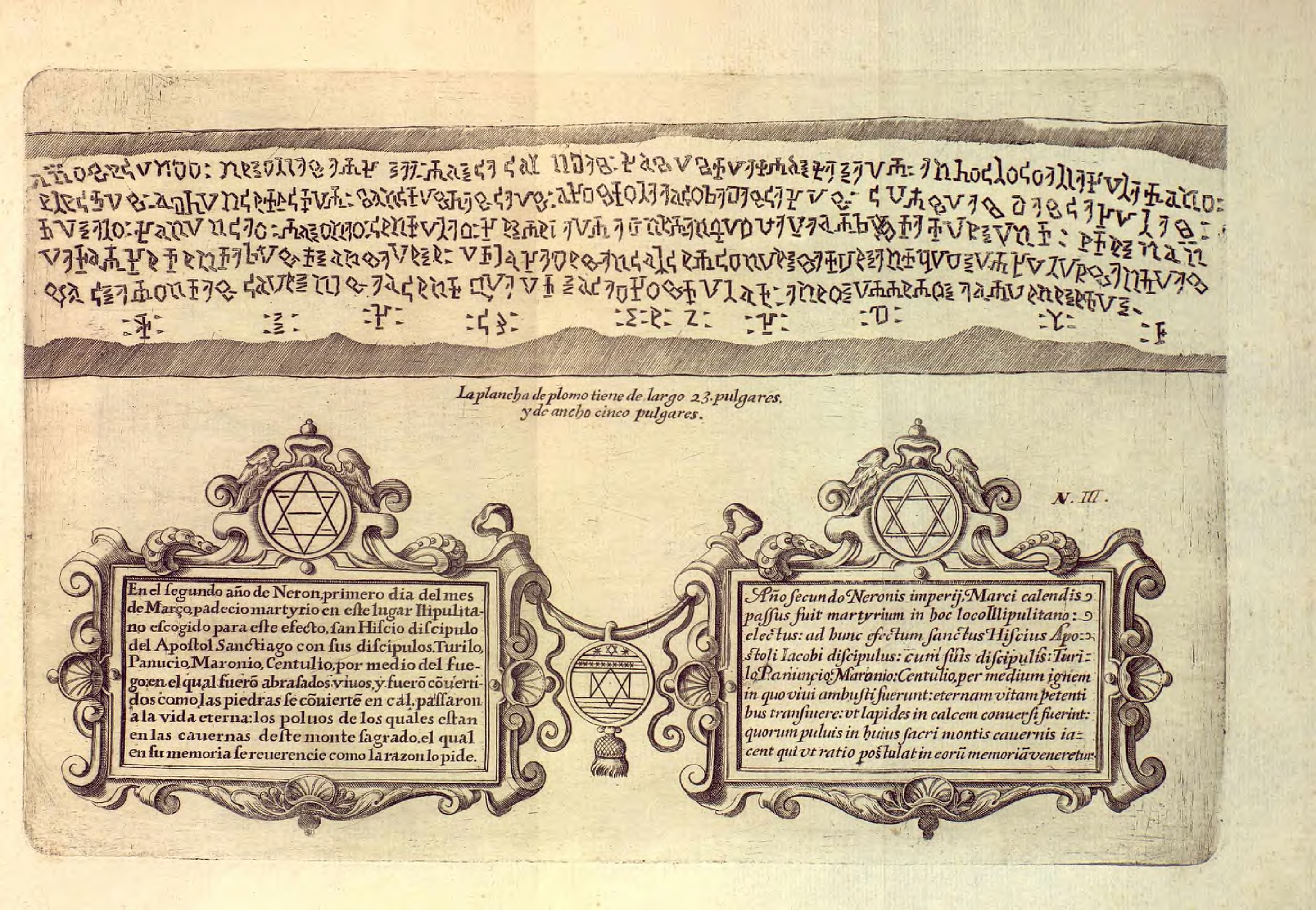
Another unrolled plate.

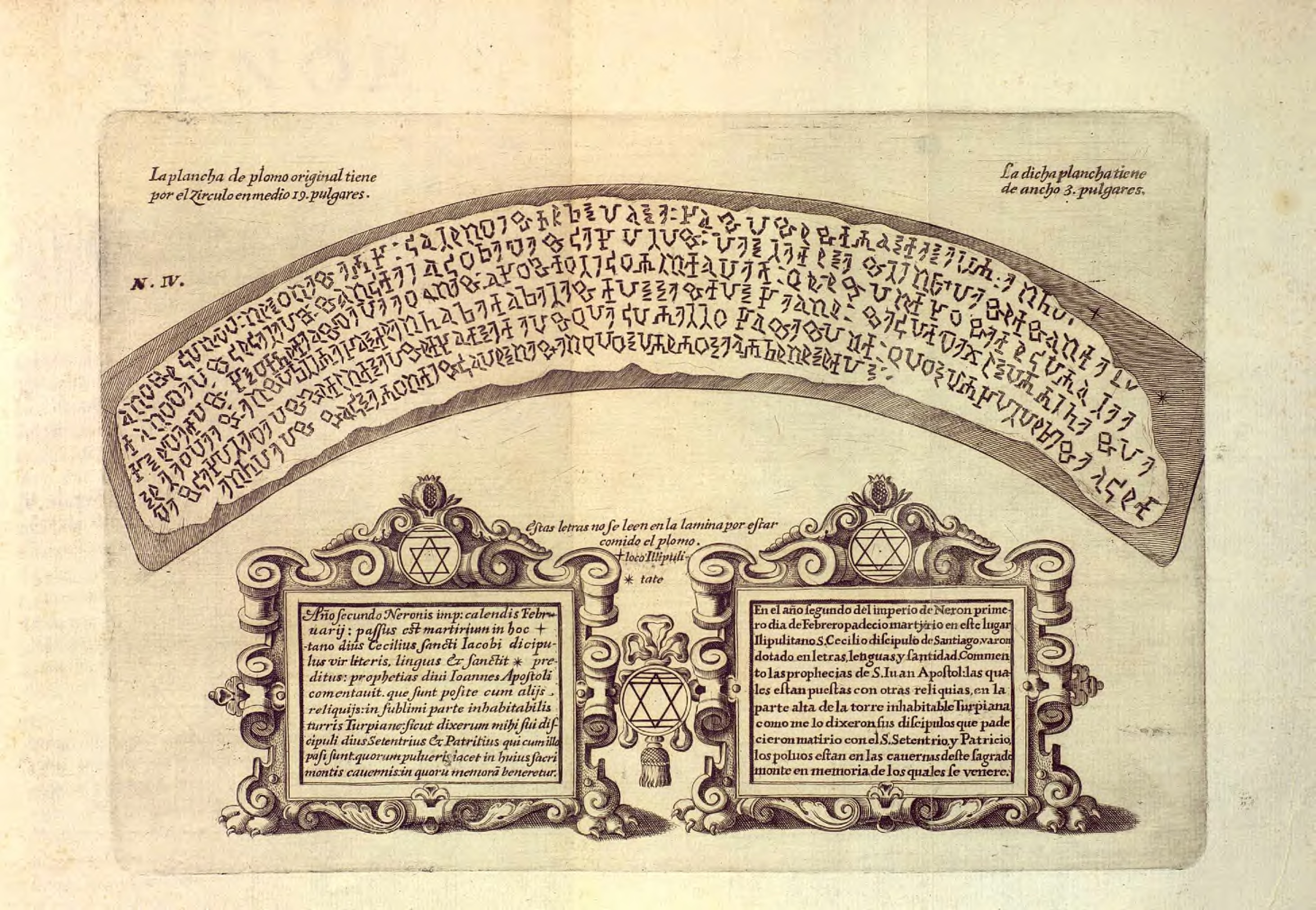
A third unrolled plate.

The Lead Books of Sacromonte (Spanish: Los Libros Plúmbeos del Sacromonte) are a series of texts inscribed on circular lead leaves, now considered to be 16th century forgeries.

== History ==
The Lead Books were discovered in the caves of Sacromonte, a hillside outside the old city of Granada, Spain, between 1595 and 1606. They originally comprised 22 volumes of inscribed circular lead leaves, laced together with lead wire and bound within folded lead covers; although three volumes no longer survive. The books were found together with burned human remains, identified by lead plaques as being those of Caecilius of Elvira and eleven followers, supposedly martyred under the Emperor Nero. References in the books claim that they were inscribed by Arabic-speaking Christians during the Roman period, and deposited with the martyrs' remains. The books are thought to be related to earlier writings and relics using the same form of writing that were discovered in 1588 during the demolition of the Cathedral of Granada, which was built over the location of the city's Great Mosque.

The Lead Books appeared to be written in a combination of Arabic and Latin, using characters that 16th century Morisco scholars claimed to recognise as "Solomonic" and which they identified as pre-Islamic Arabic. Many letter forms were uncertain, and the texts themselves were cryptic and obscure, so the Catholic authorities, led by archbishop Don Pedro de Castro, found themselves entirely reliant on Morisco translators; chief amongst whom were Miguel de Luna and Alonso del Castillo, who by fortunate chance lived in the nearby Albaicin, and who had indeed been instrumental in the rediscovery of some of the books. One complete book, the so-called "Libro Mudo", or "Mute Book", has remained undeciphered and untranslated to this day.

As reported by the Christian Morisco translators, the books recorded the prophetic and liturgical teachings of the Blessed Virgin Mary, chiefly addressed through Saint Peter, in which she gave instructions for Saint James the Great and Saint Caecilius to be dispatched on a mission to evangelise Spain, stating her love for the Arabic peoples and language of that land, and promising her particular guardianship over the city of Granada. Taken together, the books may be regarded as a supplement to the canonical Acts of the Apostles (and taken together, are indeed of similar length), but recording an alternative mission history in which Saint Paul does not appear. The Virgin's words had apparently been delivered in Latin, but were claimed to have been translated and interpreted into Arabic by Caecilius. The texts include an explicit reference, in Latin, to the Counter-Reformation formulation of the doctrine of the Immaculate Conception (Mariam non comprehendit peccatum originale), but also employ terminology otherwise closer to Islamic formulae: "God is One. There is no other God but God, and Jesus is the Spirit of God."

A consistent theme is to emphasise Arabic as an ancient language of Spain, Arabs in Granada as the first Christians in Spain, and Christianity as the true religion of the Arabs. The form of Christianity presented is such as to be highly acceptable to Catholics in Granada, emphasising the veneration of relics, the cult of the Virgin, and the priority of Granada as a Christian bishopric, but also downplaying some aspects of Christianity that were most repugnant to Muslims, including the cult of icons, the doctrine of the Trinity, the worship of Jesus as the incarnate Son of God and the use of wine in the Eucharist.

== Analysis ==
Early 17th century Protestant scholars in the Netherlands also took a keen interest, but their characterisation of the Lead Books as a blatant fabrication only served to discredit dissenting opinions within Catholic Spain by association with heresy. The Vatican remained highly sceptical of the texts, however, and in 1642 succeeded in having the Lead Books sent to Rome, together with an associated "ancient" parchment which had been discovered in 1588 in a lead box in the tower of a former mosque in the city of Granada itself. A prolonged investigation by the Holy Office in Rome concluded in 1682 that both the parchment and the Lead Books were heretical forgeries. While the Vatican's condemnation did not implicate any specific individuals, scholarly consensus since the sixteenth century is that the forgers were probably Luna and Castillo, the same two Moriscos who had "translated" many of the texts. While further discussion of the books by Catholics was officially forbidden, some Spanish scholars continued to maintain the authenticity of the texts through till the 19th century. The Lead Books were kept in the Vatican, but eventually returned to the Abbey of the Sacromonte in the year 2000. The Church authorities in Granada continue to forbid scholarly access however, on the grounds that the official prohibition remains in force. Current studies depend on the various (often partial and highly contradictory) transcripts and translations made at the time of the books' discovery, and on some independent decipherments produced by Vatican Arabists.

Almost all scholars now concur with the official verdict and believe that the books are a forgery intended to promote toleration of the language, dress and customs of Christian Moriscos in the face of increasing hostility from the Spanish Inquisition and the Castilian state. If so, this exercise was unsuccessful in its general objective, as it did not avoid the order of expulsion of the Moriscos which was carried out between 1604 and 1609. Both Castillo and Luna escaped the expulsion, as the archbishop of Granada, Pedro de Vaca de Castro y Quiñones, grateful for the immense increase in the prestige of his see arising from the discovery of the relics of St Caecilius, extended his personal protection to them and their families. Many of the deported Moriscos remained convinced of the books' authenticity however, and transcripts continued to circulate within Tunisia, until this practice was forcibly suppressed by Islamic religious authorities there.

The authenticity of the bones and ashes of the 12 martyrs was never officially challenged, and they continue to be venerated in the Abbey that Archbishop Castro built on the spot. Hence the legend has acquired a moral function directly contrary to the intention of its presumed original propagators; far from validating the authentically Spanish identity of Granada's Morisco traditions, the legend has served to sanction and celebrate the supersession of those traditions. The Vatican safely returned the lead books to the city of Granada after possessing them for almost 300 years, prompting more evaluation of the mysterious books since the year 2000.

== See also ==
- Sinaia lead plates – Mysterious plates made of lead found in Romania in the 19th century
