= May 1 (Eastern Orthodox liturgics) =

Day in the Eastern Orthodox liturgical calendar

Eastern Orthodox liturgical calendar
April 30	May 1	May 2
May 1 O.S. ≍ May 14 N.S. May 1 N.S ≍ April 18 O.S.

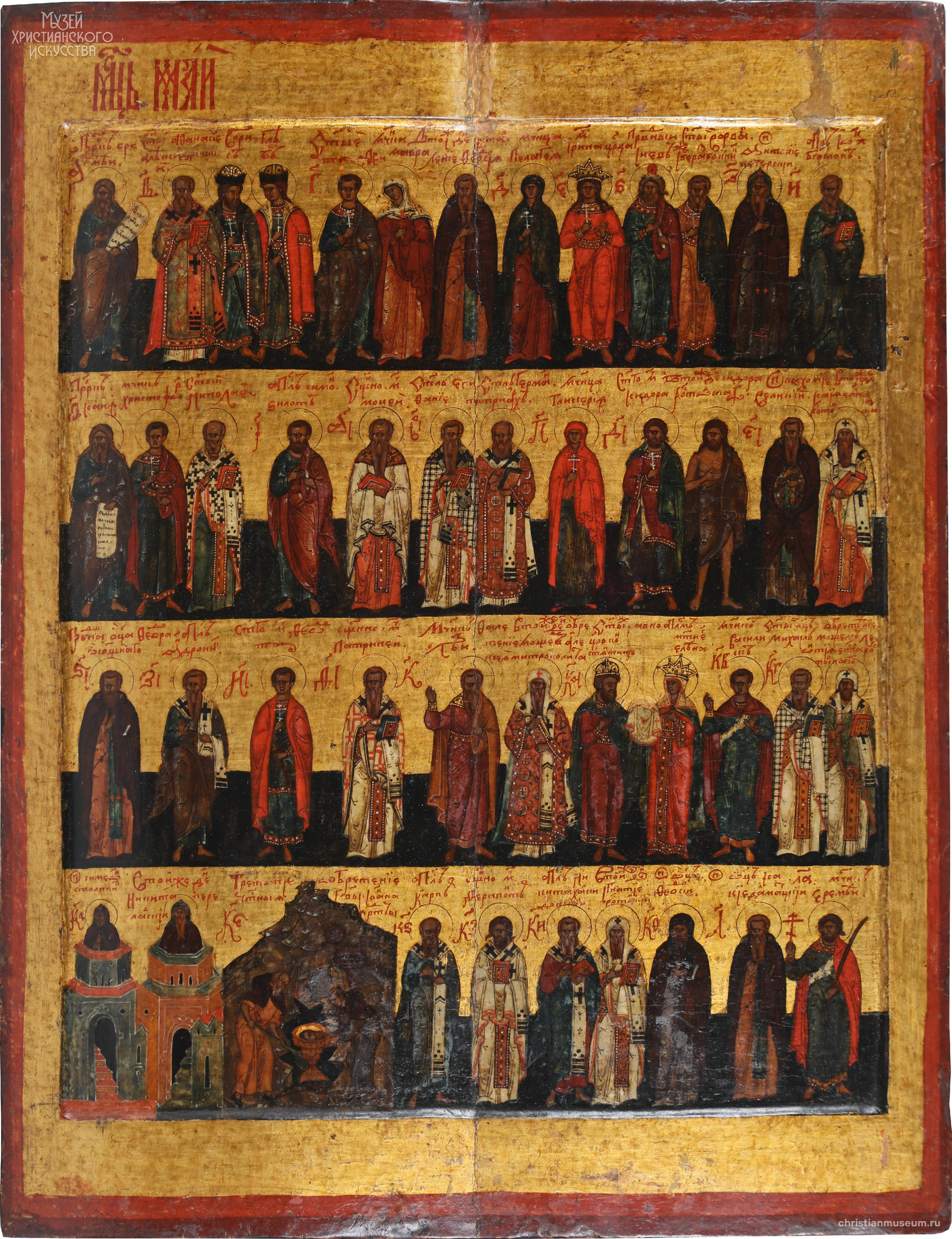
Menaion icon for May: 1 day - 1 saint

May 1 in Eastern Orthodox liturgical calendars is a feast day and a day of commemoration of saints and martyrs. Although some Orthodox churches use the Revised Julian Calendar and others use the traditional Julian calendar, the fixed commemorations for their respective May 1 are broadly the same, no matter which calendar is used. (Note: Despite the dates being the same, the days to which they refer typically differ by 13 days. The notation Old Style or O.S. is sometimes used to indicate a date in the traditional Julian Calendar (the "Old Calendar"). The notation New Style or N.S. indicates a date in the Revised Julian calendar (the "New Calendar").)

== Saints ==
- Prophet Jeremiah (c. 655 – 586 BC) (Note: "In Egypt, St. Jeremias, prophet, who was stoned to death by the people at Taphnas, where he was interred. St. Epiphanius relates that the faithful were wont to pray at his grave, and to take away from it dust to heal those who were stung by serpents.")
- Martyr Philosophos at Alexandria (252)
- Martyr Sabbas
- Venerable Hieromartyr Batas of Nisibis (Bata the Persian) (c. 364)
- Venerable Isidora the Fool-for-Christ, of Tabennisi, Egypt (c. 365)
- New Monk-martyr Romanus of Raqqa (780)
- St. Michael, ascetic of Chalcedon (8th-9th century)
- Saint Symeon of Syracuse (or of Mount Sinai or Trier) (1035) (Note: His feast day in the West is given as June 1st according to the Roman Martyrology: "At Treves, St. Simeon, monk, who was added to the number of the Saints by Pope Benedict IX.")

== Pre-Schism Western saints ==
- Martyr Andeolus of Smyrna, a subdeacon from Smyrna sent to France by St Polycarp, martyred near Viviers on the Rhône (208) (Note: "In France, in the province of Vivarais, blessed Andeol, subdeacon, who was sent from the East into Gaul with others by St. Polycarp to preach the word of God. Under the emperor Severus he was scourged with thorny sticks, and having his head split with a wooden sword into four parts, in the shape of a cross, terminated his martyrdom.")
- Martyrs Orentius and Patientia, husband and wife who lived at Loret near Huesca in Spain, parents of St. Laurence the Martyr (240)
- Martyrs Acius (Ache) and Aceolus (Acheul), the former a deacon, the latter a subdeacon, martyred near Amiens in France under Diocletian (303)
- Saint Grata of Bergamo, a holy woman from Bergamo in Italy, zealous in securing Christian burial for the bodies of the martyrs (c. 307) (Note: See also: Grata di Bergamo. Italian Wikipedia.)
- Saint Agapetos (Amator), Bishop of Auxerre and Confessor (418)
- Saint Orentius of Auch (or Orientius), a hermit in the Lavendan valley near Tarbes in France, Bishop of Auch (Augusta Ausciorum) for over 40 years (c. 439)
- Saint Corentin, Bishop of Quimper (460)
- Saint Brioc, Abbot of St. Brieuc (c. 502)
- Martyr Sigismund, King of Burgundy (524) (Note: "At Sion, in Switzerland, St. Sigismund, king of the Burgundians, who was drowned in a well, and afterwards became renowned for miracles.")
- Saint Marcul, Hieromonk of Corbeny, founder of a monastery of hermits on the Egyptian model in Nanteuil in France (c. 558)
- Saint Ceallach (Kellach), a disciple of St Kieran of Clonmacnoise, became Bishop of Killala in Ireland, ended his life as a hermit and may have been martyred (6th century)
- Saint Asaph, Bishop in North Wales (c. 600)
- Saint Aredius of Gap (Arigius, Arey), Bishop of Gap in France for twenty years (604)
- Saint Bertha of Val d'Or, martyr, founder and abbess of Avenay in the diocese of Châlons-sur-Marne (680)
- Martyr Evermarus of Tongres, pilgrim murdered by robbers at Rousson, near Tongres, Belgium (c. 700)
- Saint Théodard, Archbishop of Narbonne (893)
- Saint Benedict of Szkalka, a hermit on Mount Zobor in Hungary, disciple of St. Andrew Zorard, renowned for his asceticism, murdered by robbers (1012)

== Post-Schism Orthodox saints ==
- Saint Tamar of Georgia, Queen (1213)
- Saint Paphnutius of Borovsk, Abbot (1477)
- Hieromartyr Macarius of Kiev, Metropolitan of Kiev (1497) (Note: St Macarius’s relics were formerly enshrined in St Sophia’s Cathedral. His martyrdom is notable because he was serving the Divine Liturgy when the Tatars attacked his Church. He refused to leave the Altar and was martyred in front of it. The Euchologion of St Peter Mohyla affirms that if a priest or bishop is serving the Divine Liturgy and the place where he is serving it is attacked by enemies, he may try to escape or else remain where he is. Should he be killed in so doing, he would be placed in the calendar as a Martyr.)
- St. Zosimas, bishop of Kumurdo (15th century)
- Saint Gerasimus of Boldinsk, abbot (1554) (Note: See: (in Russian) Герасим Болдинский. Википедии. (Russian Wikipedia).)
- Saint Panaretus of Cyprus, archbishop (1791)
- New Martyrs Euthymius, Ignatius (1814), and Acacius (1815) of Mount Athos.
- Saint Nicephorus of Chios, monk (1821)
- New Martyr Mary of Crete (Mary of Mirambelos) (1826)
- Schemamonk Luke of Glinsk Hermitage (1898)

=== New martyrs and confessors ===
- Virgin-martyr Nina (Kuznyetsova), new martyr of Vologda (1938) (Note: Also commemorated on October 8, the Synaxis of the Saints of Vyatka.)
- New Hiero-confessor Tryphon of Svyatogorsk Monastery (1939) (Note: See: (in Russian) Трифон (Скрипченко). Википедии. (Russian Wikipedia).) (see also: September 11 - Synaxis of the Saints of Svatogorsk)

== Other commemorations ==
- Icon of the Most Holy Theotokos "Unexpected Joy" (“Neochikuvana Radist”) from Andronikov Monastery.
- "Myrrh-Bearing" Icon of the Mother of God of Tsarevokokshaisk (in the province of Kazan) (1647)
- Translation of the relics (870) of Saint Walburga, Abbess of Heidenheim, to Eichstätt.

== Icon gallery ==
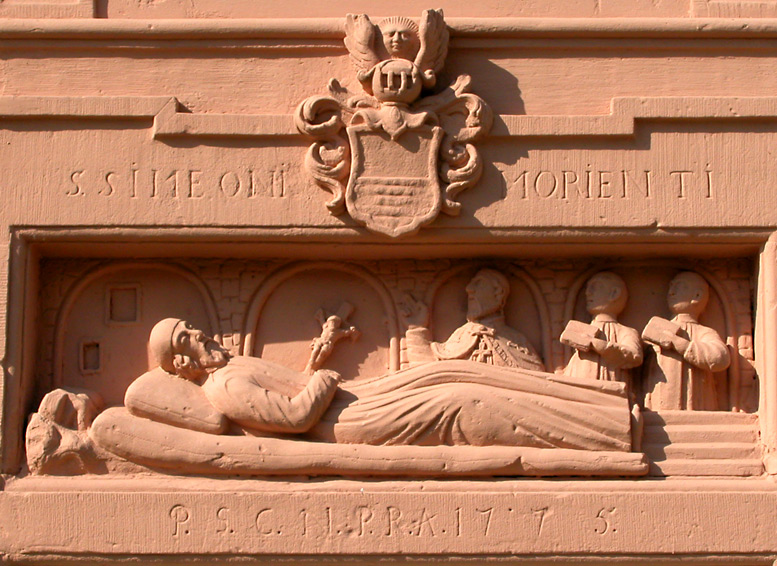
High relief of St. Saint Symeon of Syracuse, Trier.

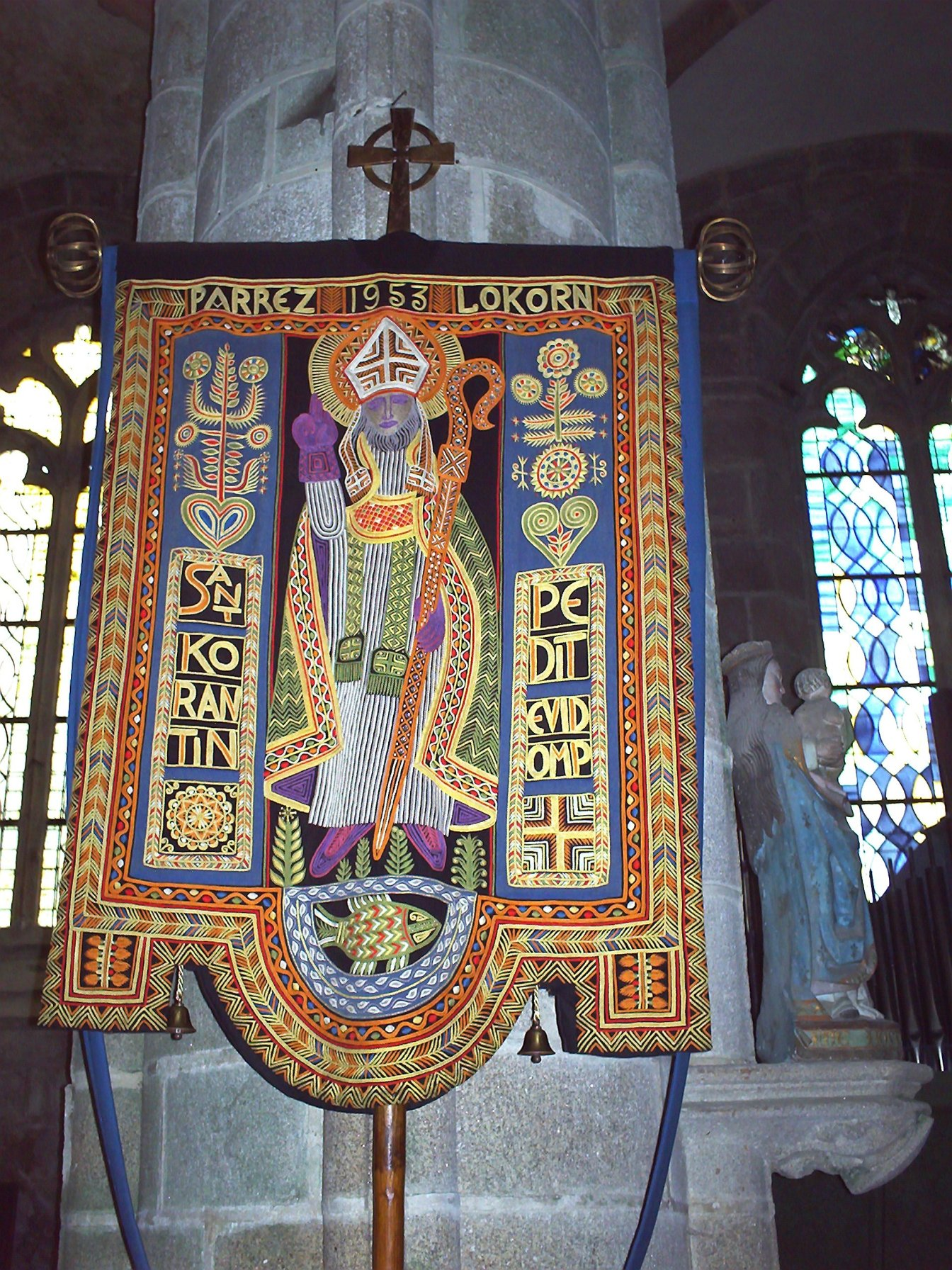
Labarum of St. Corentin of Quimper (Parish church of Locronan, Brittany).

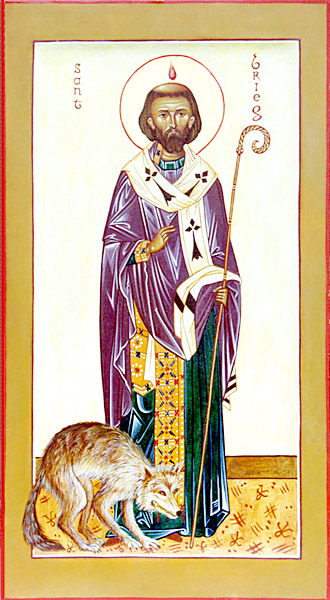
St. Brioc.

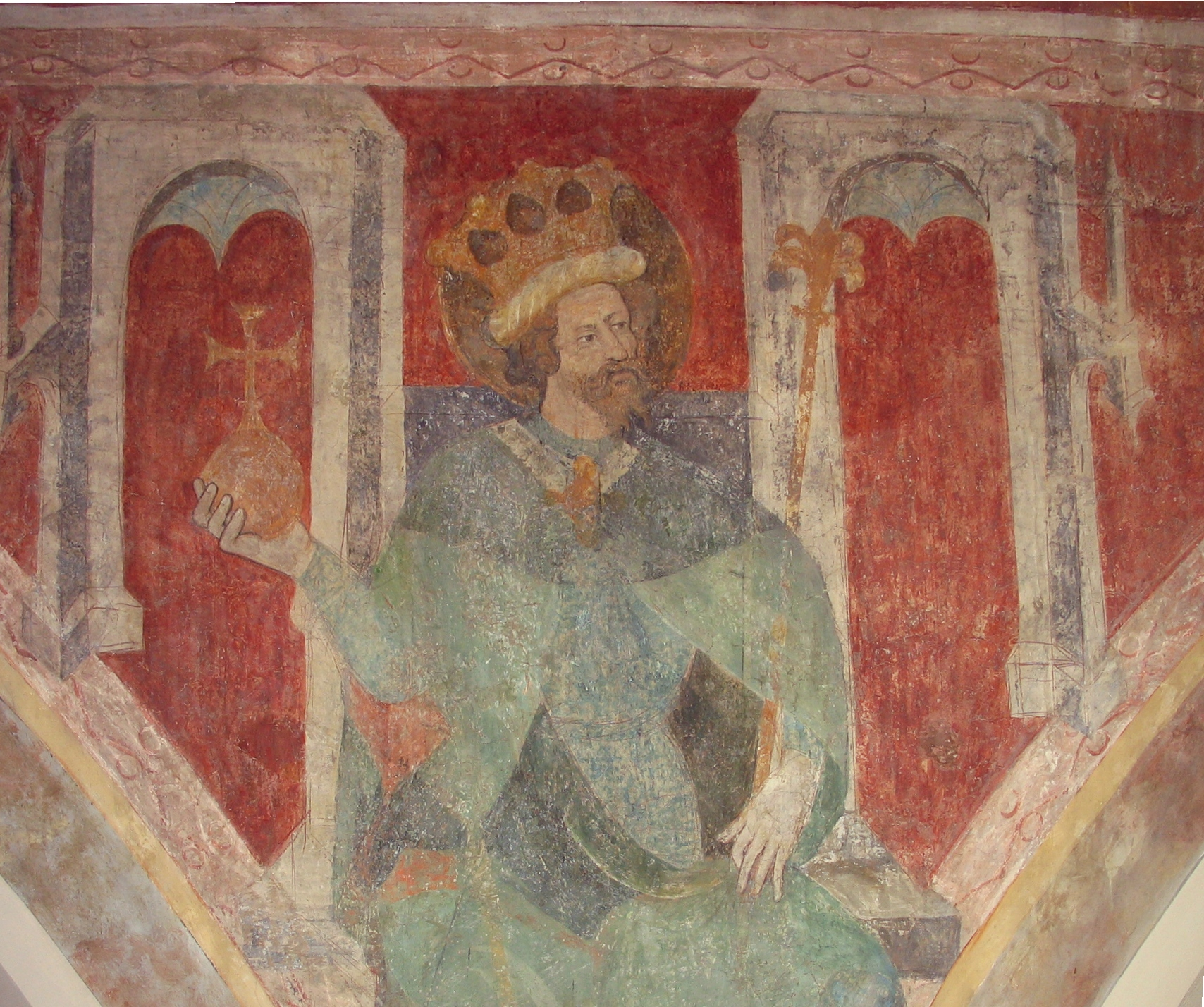
Fresco of St. Sigismund of Burgundy, (c. 1417-1437).

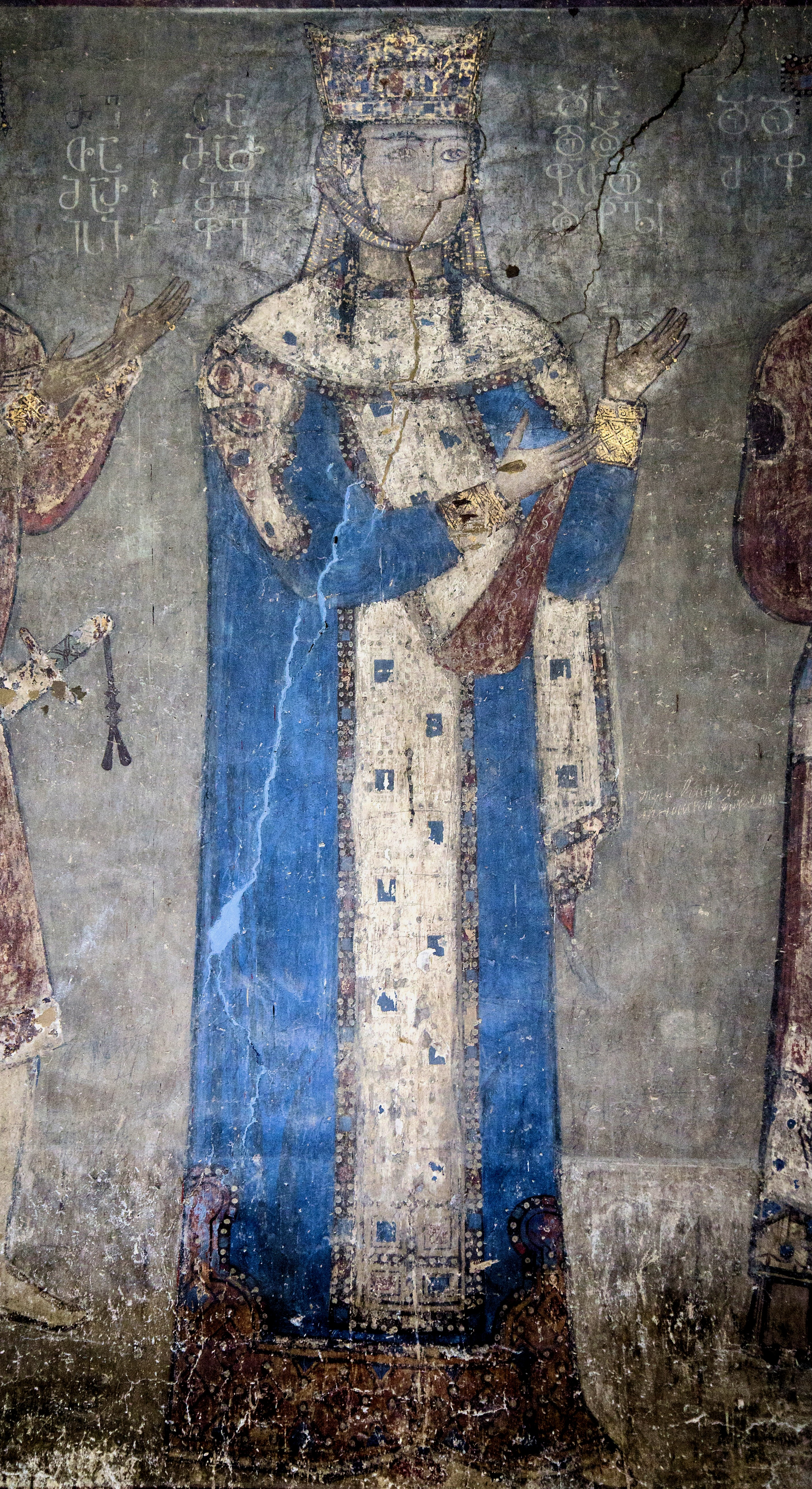
Fresco of St. Tamar of Georgia, Queen of Georgia. (Betania Monastery c. 1184–1186).

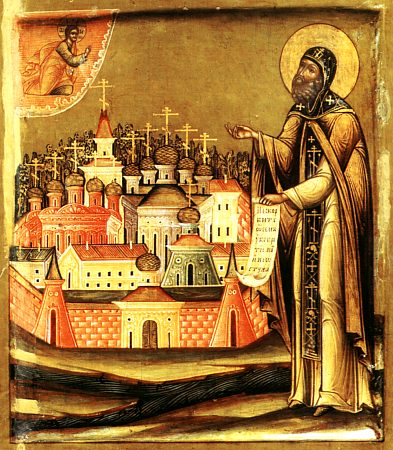
Saint Paphnutius of Borovsk, Abbot.

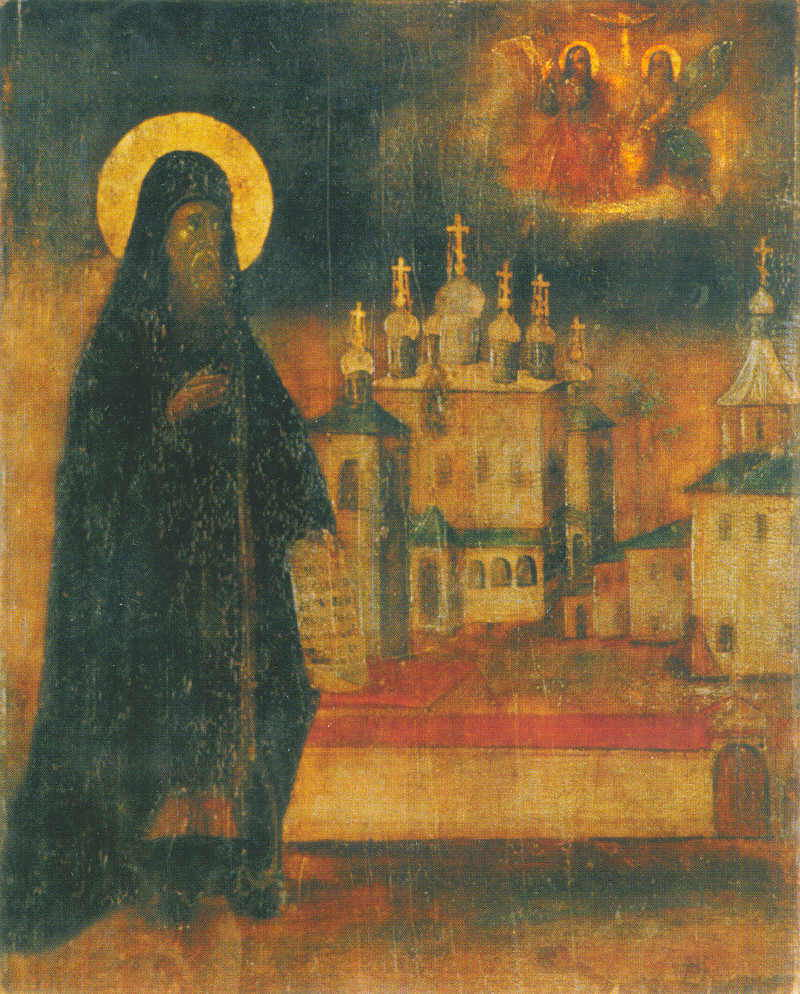
Saint Gerasimus of Boldinsk, Abbot.

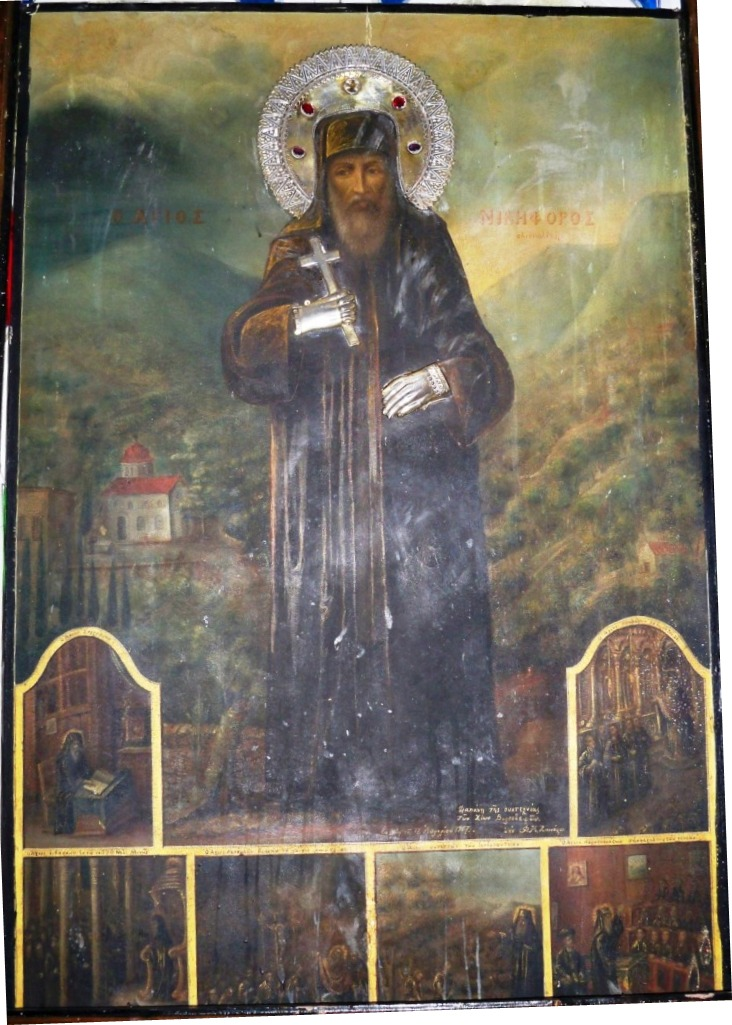
Saint Nicephorus of Chios.

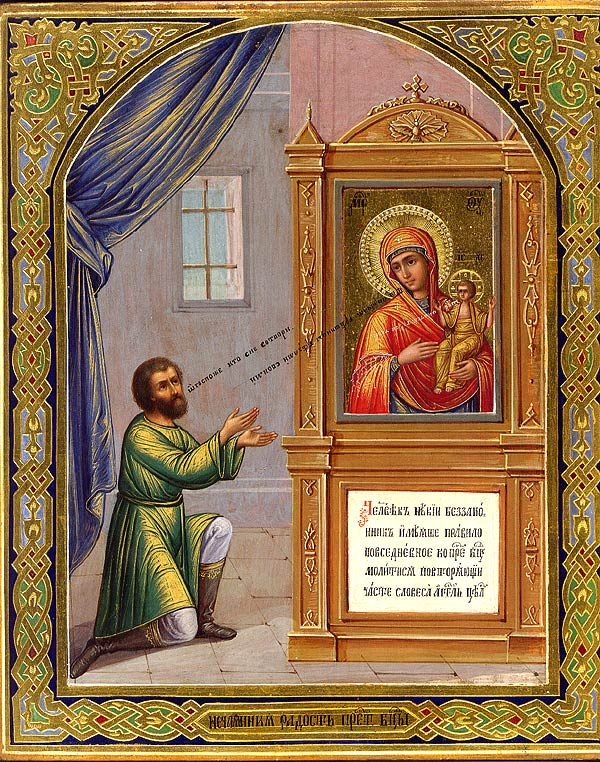
Icon of the Most Holy Theotokos "Unexpected Joy"

== Sources ==
- May 1/14. Orthodox Calendar (PRAVOSLAVIE.RU)
- May 14, 2011 / May 1, 2011 (Church Calendar). HOLY TRINITY RUSSIAN ORTHODOX CHURCH (A parish of the Patriarchate of Moscow)
- May 1. OCA - The Lives of the Saints.
- AN ENGLISH ORTHODOX CALENDAR.
- May 1. Latin Saints of the Orthodox Patriarchate of Rome.
- The Roman Martyrology. Transl. by the Archbishop of Baltimore. Last Edition, According to the Copy Printed at Rome in 1914. Revised Edition, with the Imprimatur of His Eminence Cardinal Gibbons. Baltimore: John Murphy Company, 1916. pp. 123–124.
- Rev. Richard Stanton. A Menology of England and Wales, or, Brief Memorials of the Ancient British and English Saints Arranged According to the Calendar, Together with the Martyrs of the 16th and 17th Centuries. London: Burns & Oates, 1892. pp. 190–192.

Greek Sources

- Great Synaxaristes: (in Greek) 1 ΜΑΪΟΥ. ΜΕΓΑΣ ΣΥΝΑΞΑΡΙΣΤΗΣ.
- (in Greek) Συναξαριστής. 1 Μαΐου. ECCLESIA.GR. (H ΕΚΚΛΗΣΙΑ ΤΗΣ ΕΛΛΑΔΟΣ).

Russian Sources

- (in Russian) 14 мая (1 мая). Православная Энциклопедия под редакцией Патриарха Московского и всея Руси Кирилла (электронная версия). (Orthodox Encyclopedia - Pravenc.ru).
- (in Russian) 1 мая (ст.ст.) 14 мая 2013 (нов. ст.). Русская Православная Церковь Отдел внешних церковных связей. (DECR).
