= Simeonstift of Trier =

Museum in Trier, Germany

Coordinates: 49°45′35″N 6°38′36″E

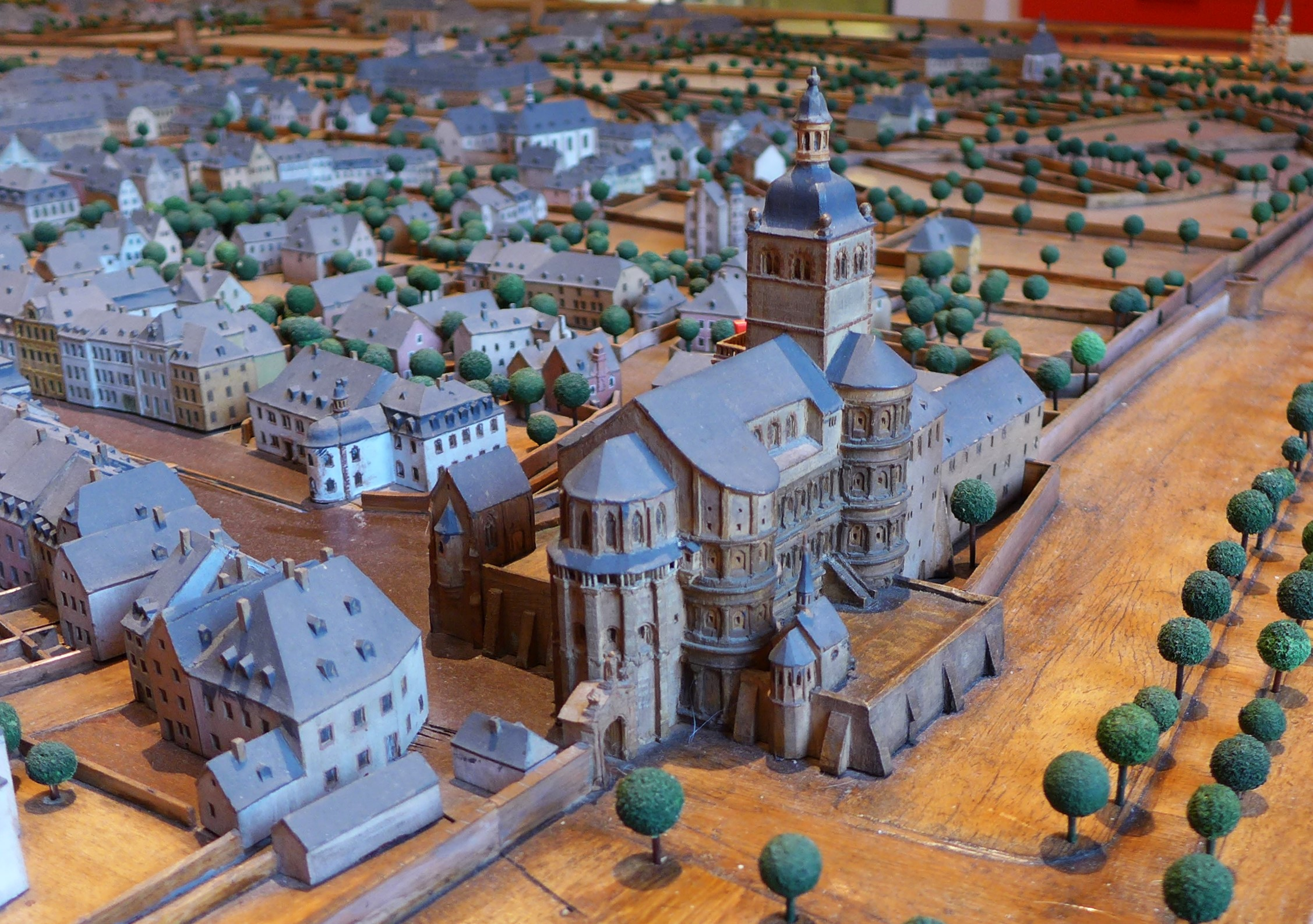
Model of the Simeonstift as it appeared around 1800

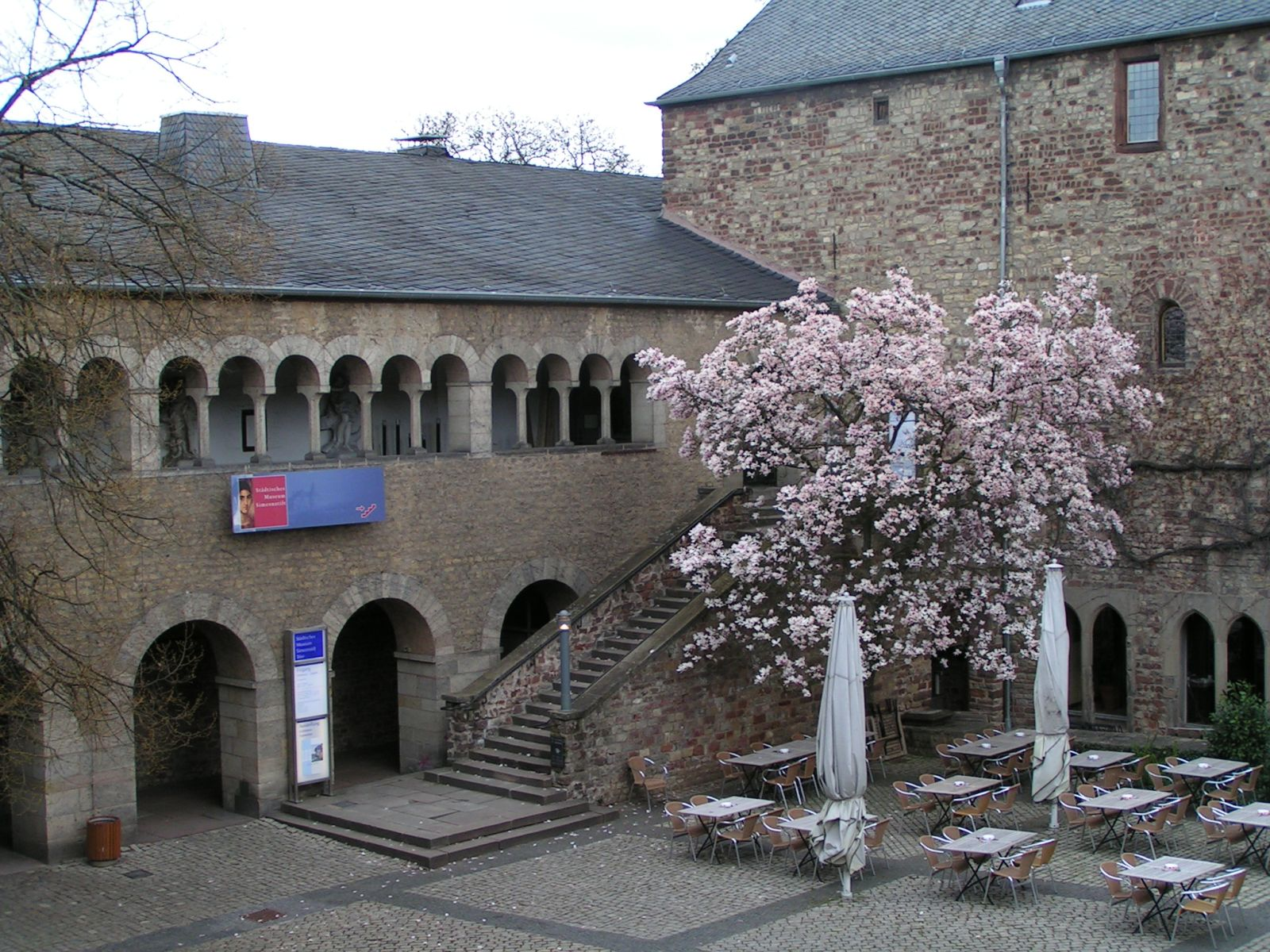
The cloister

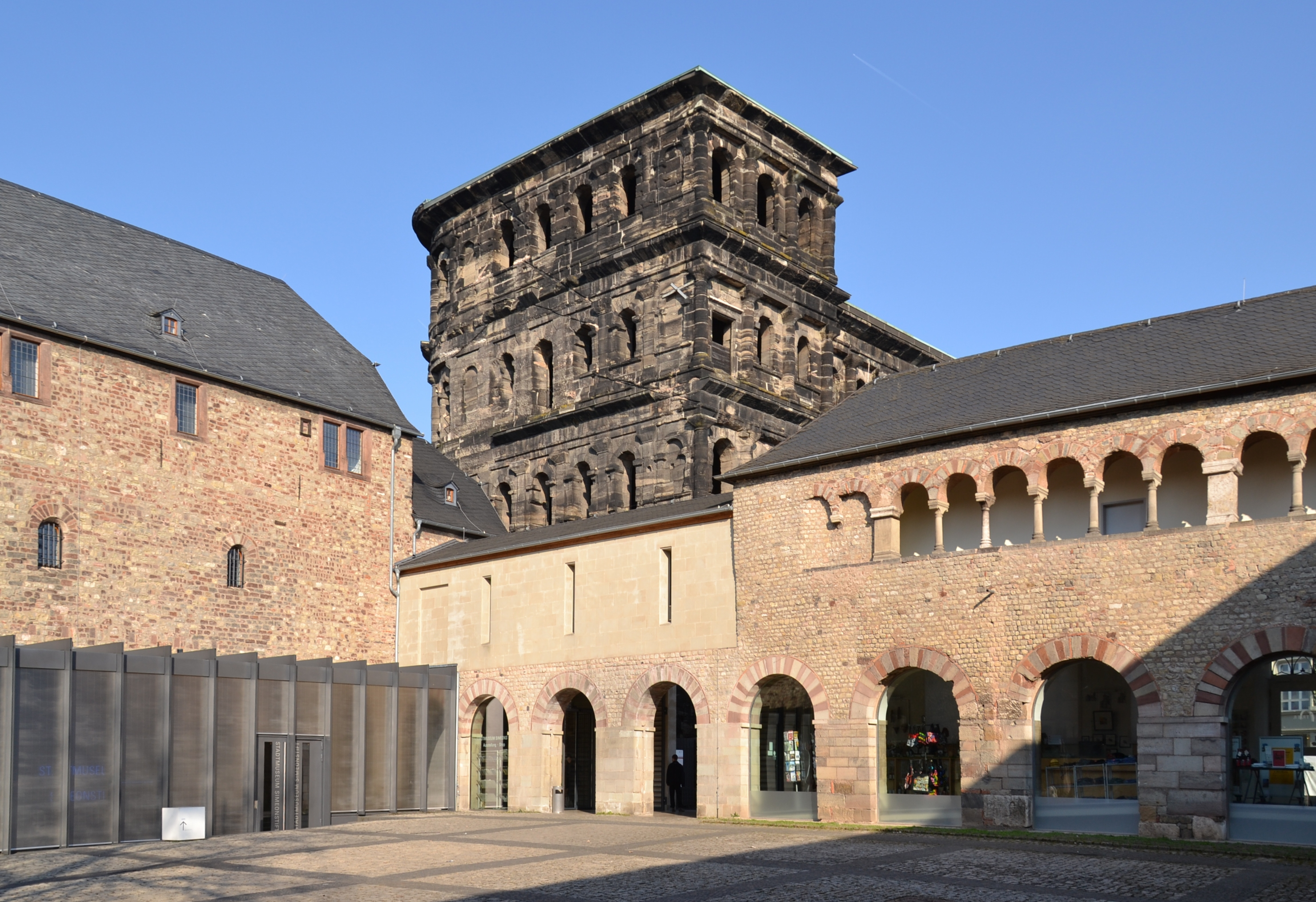
View of the Porta Nigra from the cloister

St. Simeon's Collegiate Church (German: Simeonstift) was a collegiate church in Trier, Germany, incorporating the Porta Nigra, the Roman gate of the city. It was established some time after 1035 and dedicated to the Greek monk Simeon of Trier, who had lived in the Porta Nigra as a hermit. It was dissolved in 1802. Its cloister is now a museum under the name Stadtmuseum Simeonstift ("City Museum of the Simeonstift").

Simeon of Trier settled at the Porta Nigra in 1028, allegedly walling himself up inside it. After his death on 1 June 1035, he was buried on the ground floor. In the same year he was canonized by Pope Benedict IX in one of the first canonizations ever made by a Pope. In honor of the new saint, the Porta Nigra was converted into a church, known as the Simeonstift. The church's charter has not survived, although recent research shows that it was founded soon after Simeon's canonization. It was documented for the first time in 1048.

The church was adjoined by a two-story cloister with a dormitory in the north wing and a refectory in the west wing. According to dendrochronological findings, the north wing dates from 1040.

In 1098, Emperor Henry IV confirmed all the Simeonstift's possessions, which included more than sixty properties and privileges.

The conversion of the Porta Nigra was reversed more than 750 years later, in 1804, on the orders of Napoleon. Since then, the gate has reverted almost to its original Roman appearance. Only the apse projecting from its eastern end testifies that it was once an imposing church.
