= Jacques-Marie-Louis Monsabré =

French Dominican and pulpit orator

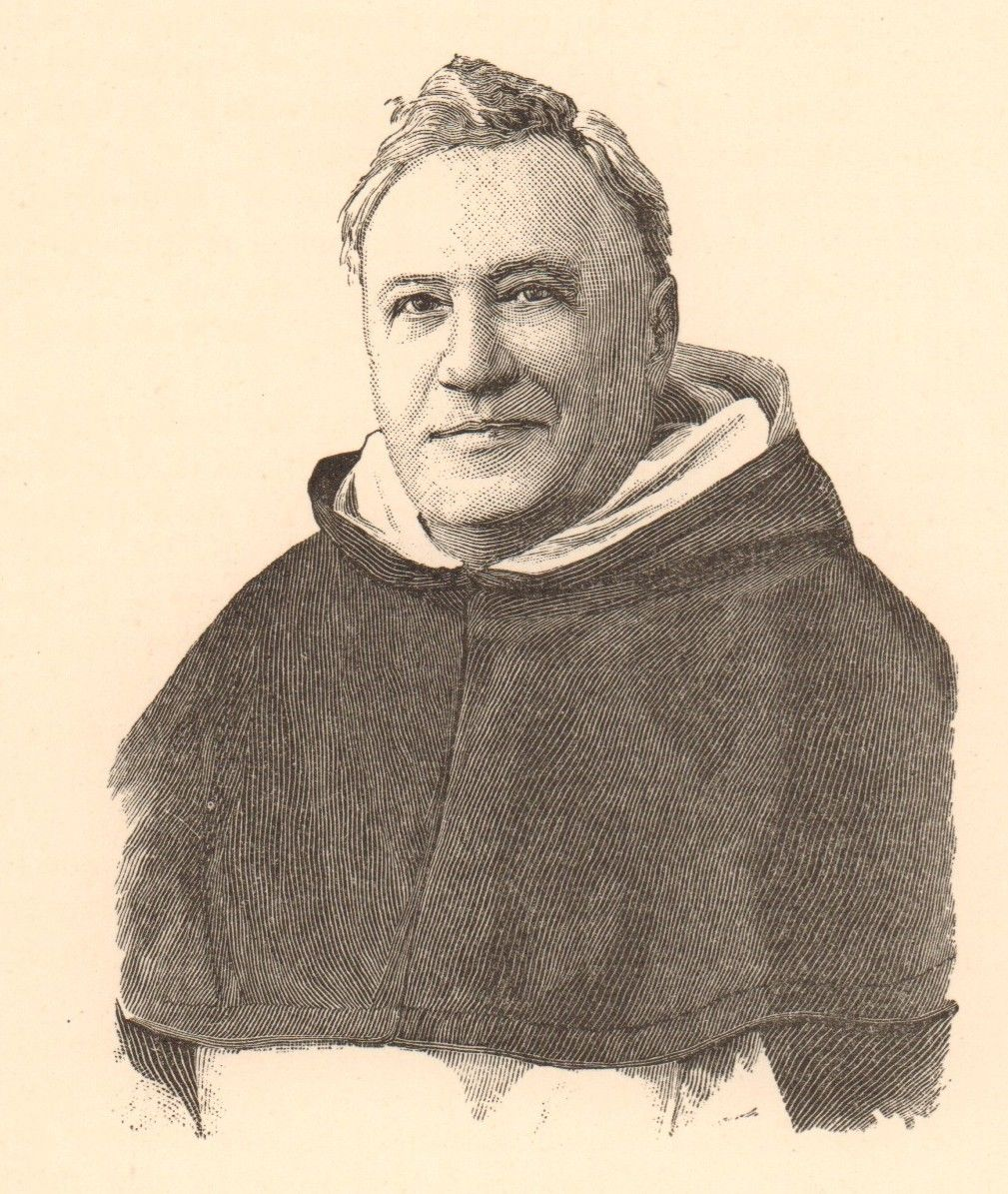
Jacques-Marie-Louis Monsabré

Jacques-Marie-Louis Monsabré (born 10 December 1827, Blois – died 21 February 1907, Le Havre) was a French Dominican, a celebrated pulpit orator.

== Life ==
Monsabré was ordained as a secular priest 15 June 1851, but soon felt he had a religious vocation. On the thirty-first of July, 1851, the feast of St. Ignatius, he celebrated his first Mass and thought seriously of entering the Society of Jesus. Four days later, however, the feast of St. Dominic, he decided to become a Dominican and immediately wrote a letter of application to Jean-Baptiste Henri Lacordaire.

He had to wait four years for release from the diocese, as the bishop had received authorization from the Holy See to withhold that long his permission for newly ordained priests to enter a religious order. In May, 1855, he received his dimissorials, entered the novitiate at Flavigny, received the habit on the thirty-first of the same month and one year later made his simple profession. A few days later he was sent to the house of studies at Chalais, where he spent a year in solitude and prayer.

In the winter he was appointed to preach the Lenten sermons in the church of St. Nizier, at Lyon, where he gave the first indication of his eloquence. After preaching the Lenten sermons in Lyon, Monsabré was assigned to the convent of St. Thomas, in Paris, where he began to give conferences.

After interrupting this ministry for several years he took it up again. In the Advent of 1867 he gave conferences in the convent church. He preached then for a number of years in the principal cities of France, Belgium, and in London, conducting retreats, novenas, and triduums. His reputation, however, was really first made by the course of Advent sermons which he preached in the Cathedral of Notre Dame, Paris, in 1869, as successor of Hyacinthe Loyson. The success of these conferences brought the invitation to preach the Lenten sermons in Notre Dame in 1870, succeeding Célestin Joseph Félix of the Society of Jesus.

During the siege of Paris by the Prussian troops, the conferences at Notre Dame were interrupted. On the capitulation of Metz, Monsabré preached from one of its pulpits. Meanwhile, the archbishop of Paris, Georges Darboy, had fallen a victim to the Commune and was succeeded by Joseph-Hippolyte Guibert, who lost no time in inviting Monsabré to occupy the pulpit of his cathedral. From this time on, Monsabré preached in the Cathedral of Notre Dame for twenty years. He conceived and executed the gigantic plan of expounding the whole system of Catholic dogmatic theology.

The classic and elegant form of Monsabré's discourses attracted the educated class of France. "His intense love of souls and apostolic zeal made his discourses throb with life, and his clear and profoundly theological mind enabled him to shed light even upon the most abstruse tenets of the faith, while his earnest and impassioned appeals to all the noblest impulses of man always met with an enthusiastic response."

In 1890 he preached the Advent sermons in Rome. In 1891 he gave the same course in Toulouse. On the death of Charles-Émile Freppel, bishop of Angers, he was invited to fill the vacancy in the Chamber of Deputies, but declined.

In 1871 he was sent to the General Chapter of Ghent to represent his province and in 1898 to that of Avila as Definitor. His preaching closed with the oration delivered at Reims on the occasion of the fourteenth centenary of the baptism of Clovis, King of the Franks.

From 1903 he lived in retirement. In that year the Dominican convent in which he lived was confiscated by the government, and he was obliged to take refuge in a modest home, in which he died.

== Works ==
Monsabré's published works consist of forty-eight volumes, the L'exposition du Dogme Catholique being noted for its eloquence and popular exposition of Catholic dogma.
