= Célestin Joseph Félix =

French Jesuit preacher (1810–1891)

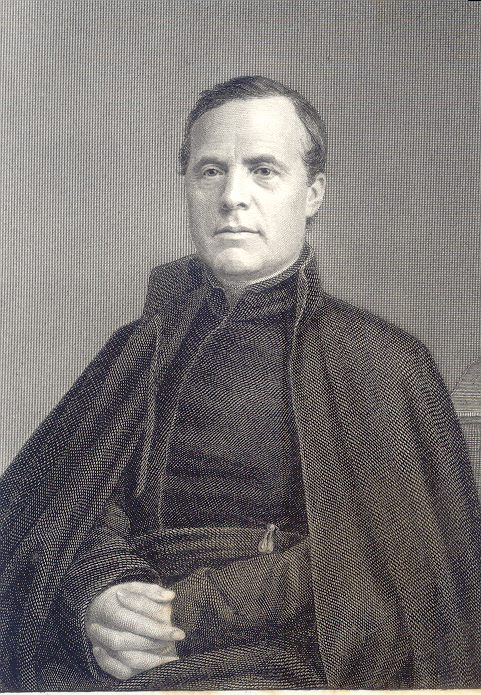
Célestin Joseph Félix.

Célestin Joseph Félix (b. at Neuville-sur-Escaut, Nord, 28 June 1810; d. at Lille, 7 July 1891) was a French Jesuit, known as a preacher.

== Life ==
Félix began his studies under the Brothers of Christian Doctrine, going later to the preparatory seminary at Cambrai, where he completed his secondary studies. In 1833 he was named professor of rhetoric, received minor orders and the diaconate, and in 1837 entered the Society of Jesus.

He began his noviceship at Drongen in Belgium, continued it at Saint-Acheul, and ended it at Brugelette, where he studied philosophy and the sciences. Having completed his theological studies at Louvain, he was ordained in 1842 and returned to Brugelette to teach rhetoric and philosophy. His earliest Lenten discourses, preached at Ath, and especially one on true patriotism, soon won him a reputation for eloquence.

Called to Amiens in 1850, he introduced the teaching of rhetoric at the College de la Providence and preaching during Advent and Lent at the cathedral. His oratorical qualities becoming more and more evident, he was called to Paris. He first preached at St. Thomas d'Aquin in 1851, and in 1852 preached Lenten sermons at Saint-Germain-des-Pres, and those of Advent at Saint-Sulpice. It was then that Marie-Dominique-Auguste Sibour named him to succeed the Dominican, Jean-Baptiste Henri Lacordaire, and the Jesuit, Gustave Xavier Lacroix de Ravignan, in the pulpit of Notre-Dame (1853 to 1870).

While he was in Paris, and especially during his stay at Nancy (1867–1883), and at Lille (1883–1891), he spoke in nearly all the great cathedrals of France and Belgium. In 1881 he went to Copenhagen to conduct the Advent exercises, and there he held a celebrated conference on authority.

== Works ==
In 1856, Félix began the subject which he made the major work of his life: Progrès par le Christianisme. This formed the matter of a series of Lenten conferences, published in fifteen volumes. Progress in all its forms, whether of the individual or of the family, in science, art, morals, or government, is herein treated with doctrinal exactness and breadth of view. The practical conclusions of these conferences Félix summed up every year in his preaching of the Easter retreat, which had been inaugurated by de Ravignan.

Félix founded the Society of St. Michael for the distribution of Catholic books and employed the leisure of his last years in the composition of several works and in the revision of his Retraites a Notre-Dame, which he published in six volumes.

A list of his works is given by Sommervogel.
