= Charles Cahier =

French antiquarian

Charles Cahier (26 February 1807 – 26 February 1882) was a French antiquarian, born in Paris on February 26, 1807.

== Biography ==
He made his preparatory studies at the College of Saint-Acheul and entered the Society of Jesus (the Jesuits) on September 7, 1824.

For some years, Cahier taught successively in the Jesuit colleges at Paris, Brig in the Swiss canton of Valais, at Turin, and at Brugelette in Belgium. The greater part of his life, however, was devoted to the collection, classification, and interpretation of the countless treasures of medieval art surviving in France, Belgium, Germany, and elsewhere in Europe. They interested him not only as relics of its artistic skill, but chiefly as pieces of evidence of its Catholic faith.

Cahier died in Paris on February 26, 1882.

== Works ==
As early as 1840 he began his collaboration with his Jesuit confrére, Arthur Martin, a draughtsman and art collector. Their first important work was a folio on the 13th century stained glass of the cathedral of Bourges, Monographie de la cathédrale de Bourges, première partie. Vitraux du XIIIe siècle (Paris, 1841–44); the substance of it is in Migne. Their most characteristic work is found in Mélanges d'archéologie, d'histoire, et de littérature etc. (Paris, 1848–59), four quarto volumes of illustrated dissertations on gold and silver church-plate, enamelled ware, carved ivories, tapestries, bas-reliefs, and paintings belonging to the Carolingian and Romanesque periods (9th to 12th century).

This contribution to the history of medieval art was followed later by four more volumes: Nouveaux mélanges d'archéologie, d'histoire, et de littérature sur le moyen-âge etc. (Paris, 1874–77), in the first volume of which is to be found a memoir of Martin by his collaborator. In the meantime, Cahier had published a monograph in two folio volumes on the saints as grasped by the popular imagination, Caractéristiques des saints dans l'art populaire (Paris, 1867).

In spite of his numerous digressions and parentheses, says Joseph Brucker, and a somewhat neglected style, Cahier is never wearisome; a vein of kindly but caustic humor runs through his pages, in which about pungent words and phrases, dictated, however, by candour and the love of truth. He was deeply versed in all kinds of curious medieval lore, and particularly in the "people's calendar" or every-day usages and customs connected with the liturgical life of the Catholic church. He also wrote studies on Christmas and on Epiphany in Amide la religion (Paris, 1848–1849), and in his Calendrier populaire du temps passé in Revue de l'art chrétien (Paris, 1878).
