= Augustin de Backer =

Belgian Jesuit (1809–1873)

Augustin de Backer SJ (18 July 1809 in Antwerp, Belgium – 1 December 1873 in Liège, Belgium) was a Belgian Jesuit and bibliographer.

== Early years and Formation ==
De Backer left his country to be educated at the Jesuit schools of France (Beauregard, Saint-Acheul) and Switzerland (Fribourg). After schooling, and rather than going to the university, he undertook to visit libraries of France and Belgium in search of books printed by Plantin. In 1835, he was received into the Society of Jesus (in Rome) by the Superior General, Father John-Baptist Roothaan, who sent him back to Nivelles, in Belgium, for his novitiate (29 June 1835). He taught three years in the school of Namur (1837-1840), and in 1840, began his studies for the priesthood in Leuven. Ordained priest on 10 September 1843.

== Bibliographer ==
While at Louvain, he came across the Bibliotheca Scriptorum Societatis Jesu published in 1676 by Nathaniel Bacon, and he resolved to revise and update the bibliography of Bacon with the help of scientific methods unavailable at the time of Nathaniel Bacon.

Based in Liège he visited Belgian and foreign libraries and, with the help of his natural brother Alois de Backer (also, coincidentally, a Jesuit), started publishing, from 1854 on, his magnum opus: La bibliothèque des écrivains de la Compagnie de Jésus. For each Jesuit author a short biographical note was given, along with the list of all his writings in their successive editions. The first edition was 7 volumes (printed from 1854 to 1861).

Augustin and Alois worked with Auguste Carayon and Carlos Sommervogel. Sommervogel's Bibliothèque de la Compagnie de Jésus remains the standard reference book for research into Jesuit writings till the end of the 19th century.

== Bibliography ==
- Van Tricht, Victor: La bibliothèque des écrivains de la Compagnie de Jésus et le Père Augustin de Backer, Louvain, 1876.
