= Saint-Acheul =

- Commune
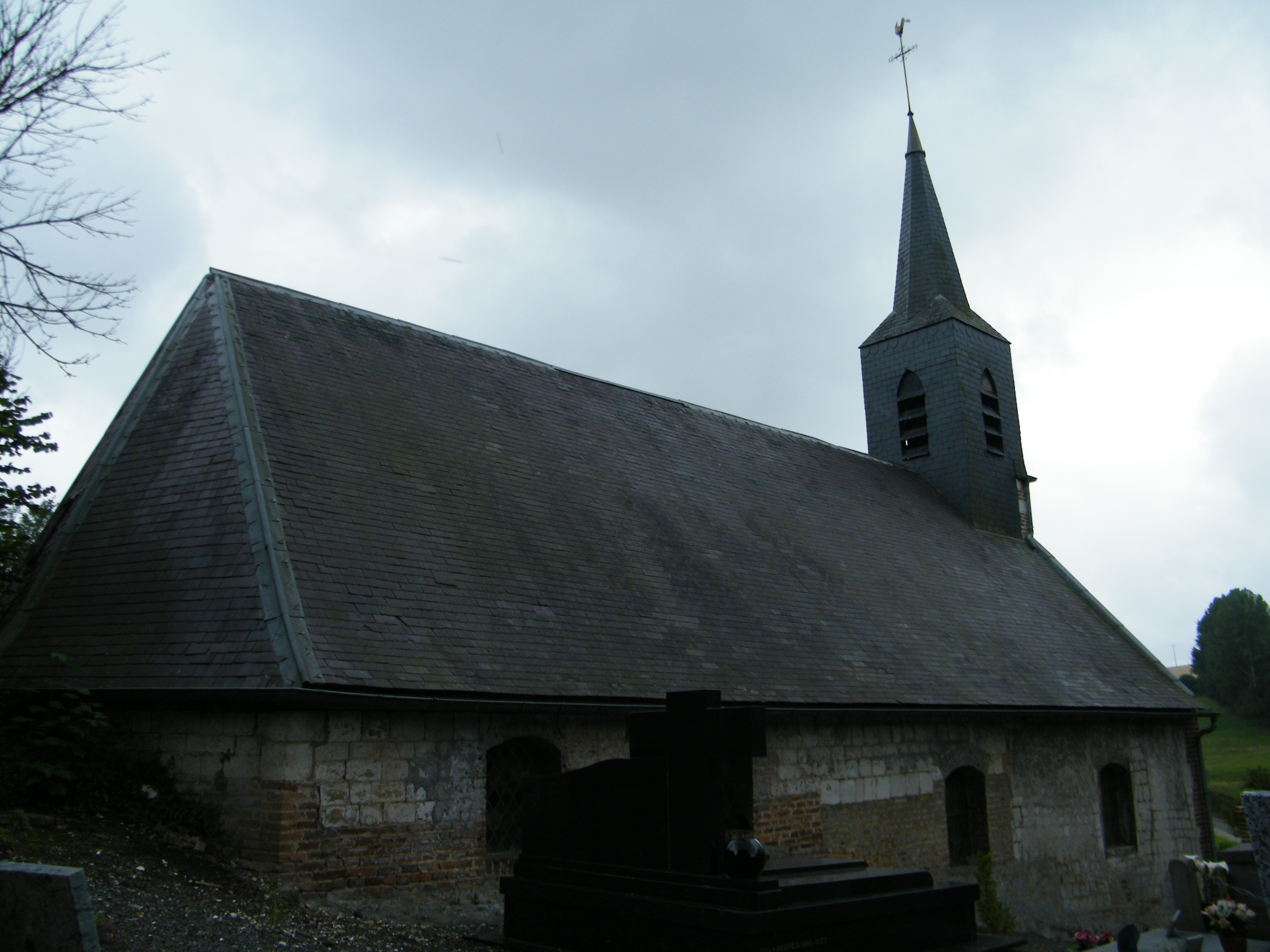
- The church in Saint-Acheul
- Location of Saint-Acheul
- Location within France Location within Hauts-de-France
- Coordinates: 50°11′29″N 2°09′52″E
- Country: France
- Region: Hauts-de-France
- Department: Somme
- Arrondissement: Amiens
- Canton: Doullens
- Intercommunality: CC Territoire Nord Picardie

Government
  - Mayor (2020–2026): Olivier Feutrel
- Area^{1}: 3.04 km^{2} (1.17 sq mi)
- Elevation: 55 m (180 ft)
- Highest elevation: 110 m (360 ft)
- Lowest elevation: 37 m (121 ft)
- Population (2023): 36
  - Density: 12/km^{2} (31/sq mi)
- Time zone: UTC+01:00 (CET)
  - Summer (DST): UTC+02:00 (CEST)
- INSEE/Postal code: 80697 /80370
- ^{1} French Land Register data, which excludes lakes, ponds, glaciers > 1 km^{2} (0.386 sq mi or 247 acres) and river estuaries.

Saint-Acheul (French pronunciation: [sɛ̃t‿aʃœl]; Picard: Saint-Acheu) is a commune in the Somme department in Hauts-de-France in northern France. It is not to be confused with Saint-Acheul, a suburb of Amiens after which the Acheulean archaeological culture of the Lower Paleolithic is named.

== Geography ==
The commune is situated some 23 miles (37 km) north of Amiens, on the junction of the D933 and D99e roads, only a few hundred yards from the border with the Pas-de-Calais

== Population ==
Historical population
Year	Pop.	±% p.a.
1968	50	—
1975	45	−1.49%
1982	43	−0.65%
1990	34	−2.89%
1999	22	−4.72%
2007	27	+2.59%
2012	29	+1.44%
2017	27	−1.42%
2023	36	+4.91%
Source: INSEE

== History ==
In the first century AD the Romans settled the area and a monastery was built in St Acheul during the Middle Ages. The name honors Saint Acheolus, who was martyred in Amiens around 290 AD. Saint Ulphia was a hermit here during the 8th century.

== See also ==
- Communes of the Somme department
