= Louis Lambillotte =

Belgian Jesuit, composer, and palaeographer

Louis Lambillotte (born La Hamaide, (Hainaut, Belgium), 27 March 1797; died Paris, 27 February 1855) was a Belgian Jesuit, composer and palaeographer of Catholic music, associated with the restoration of Gregorian music, which he inaugurated and promoted by his scientific researches and publications.

== Early life ==
Louis Lambillotte was born at La Hamaide, near Charleroi and began studying solfège, piano, and harmony at the age of seven. At the age of fifteen, he became organist in Charleroi; later he went in a similar capacity to Dinant (Belgium). In 1820 he was appointed choirmaster and organist of the Jesuit College of Saint-Acheul, Amiens. While exercising these functions he also studied the classics, and at the end of five years, in August, 1825, he entered the Society of Jesus. The thirty years of his Jesuit life were spent successively in the colleges of Saint-Acheul, Fribourg, Estavayer, Brugelette and Vaugirard (Paris).

While occupied in teaching and directing music, he gave himself up more entirely to composition, with a view to enhance both the religious ceremonies and the academic entertainments in those newly founded colleges. His powers of composition were checked by the limited ability of his performers, his orchestra, like his chorus, being entirely recruited from the ranks of the students; nevertheless he provided new music for almost every occasion, producing in the course of time, besides his volumes of canticles, a large number of motets, short oratorios, masses and secular cantatas, mostly for four-part chorus and orchestra. This music became popular, especially in educational institutions. Late in life Lambillotte regretted having published those written improvisations without taking time to revise them. After his death a revision of the greater part of them was made and published (Paris, 1870) by his pupil, the Jesuit Camille de la Croix, and by Louis Dessane, organist of St. Sulpice, Paris, and afterwards of St. Francis Xavier, New York.

He received some piano lessons from César Franck at Immaculate Conception college, and in turn taught Franck about plainchant.

== Work on Gregorian chant ==
Corrupt versions of Gregorian chant had been in use for several centuries. As a practical guide towards a radical restoration the Abbot of Solesmes Prosper Guéranger, in his Institutions Liturgiques, had laid down the principle that "when a large number of manuscripts of various epochs and from different countries agree in the version of a chant, it may be affirmed that those MSS. undoubtedly give us the phrase of St. Gregory." Acting upon this principle, Lambillotte for many years gathered and compared all the documents that were to be found in the Jesuit houses. He next undertook to visit and re-visit almost every country of Europe, exploring libraries, secular as well as monastic, in search of the most ancient MSS. and all treatises bearing on the history or the theory of the chant.

In the library of the former Benedictine Abbey of St. Gall in Switzerland, he found himself in presence of what seems to be the most authentic Gregorian manuscript in existence, i.e. a transcription from the original Antiphonarium of St. Gregory, thought to have been brought from Rome to St. Gall by the monk Romanus in the closing years of the eighth century. This volume of 131 pages of old parchment, the ivory binding of which depicts ancient Etruscan sculptures, contains all the Graduals, the Alleluias, and the Tracts of the whole year, in the ancient neumatic notation (a sort of musical stenography), together with the so-called Romanian signs, i.e. the special marks of time and expression added by Romanus.

Lambillotte succeeded, not without serious difficulty, in obtaining permission to have a facsimile of this manuscript made by an expert copyist. This he published (Brussels, 1851), adding to it his own key to the neumatic notation, and a brief historical and critical account of the document. The appearance of the Antiphonaire de St. Grégoire made a strong impression on the scholarly world, and obtained for its author a Brief of congratulation and encouragement from Pope Pius IX, 1 May 1852, and a "very honourable mention" from the French Institute, 12 November of the same year. Lambillotte now undertook to embody the results of his investigations in a new and complete edition of the liturgical chant books. He lived to finish this extensive work, but not to see its publication. The Gradual and the Vesperal appeared 1855–1856 in both Gregorian and modern notations, under the editorship of Jules Dufour d'Astafort, who had for years shared the work of Lambillotte. He also published the Esthétique, a volume of 418 pages, setting forth Lambillotte's views on the theory and the practice of Gregorian music.

Later, it became clear that the Antiphanaire was not a copy of Gregory's, and did not date from the eighth century.

The Benedictine Joseph Pothier, also worked on restoring Gregorian restoration. Pothier says of the Esthétique that it is "filled with precious information". At the same time he calls attention to some serious errors in translation and even in reading, on the subject of rhythm, which, he holds, have been conclusively refuted by Chanoine Gontier, in his Méthode de Plain Chant, pp. 96 etc. De Monter also speaks of grave errors and numerous assertions contrary to its own method, that have crept into the treatise. He attributes the introduction of the sharp into the Gregorian scales to the editors of this posthumous work.

Lambillotte's "Gradual" and "Vesperal" were adopted by only a small number of French dioceses. Some argue that his work was ahead of its time. Lambillotte made cuts and alterations which had been the chief criticism of former editions. Twenty-five years were still to elapse before the classical work in Gregorian music, the Mélodies Grégoriennes by Pothier, could make its appearance (Tournay, 1880), and another twenty-five before the teaching of Pothier was to receive official sanction and practical application through the Vatican edition. Lambillotte's contemporaries placed the following inscription on his tomb at Vaugirard:

Qui cecinit Jesum et Mariam, eripuitque tenebris Gregorium, hunc superis insere, Christe, choris. (Receive, O Christ, into Thy choirs above him who sang the praises of Jesus and Mary, and rescued the music of Gregory from the darkness of ages.)

== Hymns ==
- Come Holy Ghost
- Panis angelicus -arrangement of Aquinas
- On This Day O Beautiful Mother

== Works ==
- Chants à Marie (4 vol.), Paris 1841–1868.
- Choix de cantiques sur des airs nouveaux, Paris, 1848.
- Oratorio pour le jour de Pâques; oratorio pour le jour de la Pentecôte, Paris, 1846.
- Recueil de chants sacrés, Paris, 1851.
- Antiphonaire de Saint Grégoire, Bruxelles, 1851.
- (posthumous) Musique religieuse, Paris, 1857.
- (posthumous) Graduale romanum, Paris, 1857.

== Bibliography ==
- de Monter, M.: Louis Lambillotte et ses frères, Paris, 1871.
