= Porta Nigra =

Roman city gate in Trier, Germany

- The Porta Nigra viewed from the north.
- Interactive map of the Porta Nigra area

General information
- Type: City gate
- Architectural style: Roman
- Location: Trier, Germany
- Coordinates: 49°45′35″N 6°38′38″E
- Construction started: 170 AD

UNESCO World Heritage Site
- Official name: Roman Monuments, Cathedral of St. Peter and Church of Our Lady in Trier
- Type: Cultural
- Criteria: i, iii, iv, vi
- Designated: 1986 (10th session)
- Reference no.: 367
- Region: Europe and North America

The Porta Nigra (Latin for black gate), referred to by locals as the Porta, is a large Roman city gate in Trier, Germany. It is a monumental gateway representative of Hellenistic military architecture of the time. It is a UNESCO World Heritage Site.

The name Porta Nigra originated in the Middle Ages due to the darkened colour of its stone; the original Roman name has not been preserved.

== History ==
=== Roman ===
The Porta Nigra was built in grey sandstone after 170 AD. The original gate consisted of two four-storeyed towers, projecting as near semicircles on the outer side. A narrow courtyard separated the two gate openings on either side. For unknown reasons, however, the construction of the gate remained unfinished. For example, the stones at the northern (outer) side of the gate were never abraded, and the protruding stones would have made it impossible to install movable gates. Nonetheless, the gate was used as a town entrance for centuries until the end of the Roman era in Trier.

In Roman times, the Porta Nigra was part of a system of four city gates, one of which stood at each side of the roughly rectangular Roman city. The arrangement of the gates was complex and was used as a system to reinforce the defenses of vulnerable parts of the surrounding wall. It guarded the northern entry to the Roman city, while the Porta Alba (White Gate) was built in the east, the Porta Media (Middle Gate) in the south, and the Porta Inclyta (Famous Gate) in the west, next to the Roman bridge across the Moselle. The gates stood at the ends of the two main streets of the Roman Trier, one of which led north-south and the other east-west. Of these gates, only the Porta Nigra still exists.

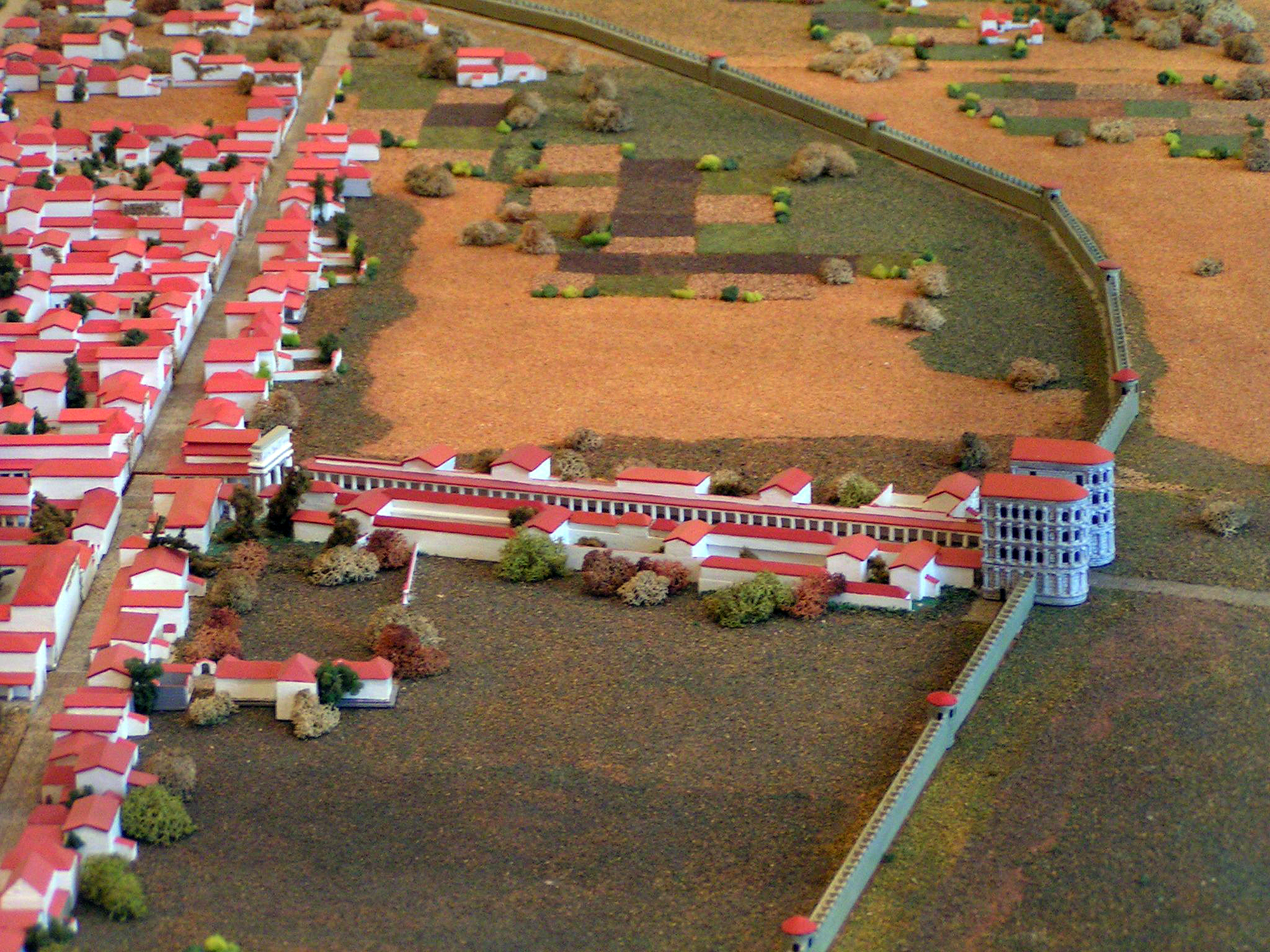
Model of the Porta Nigra in Roman times (approx. 400 AD)

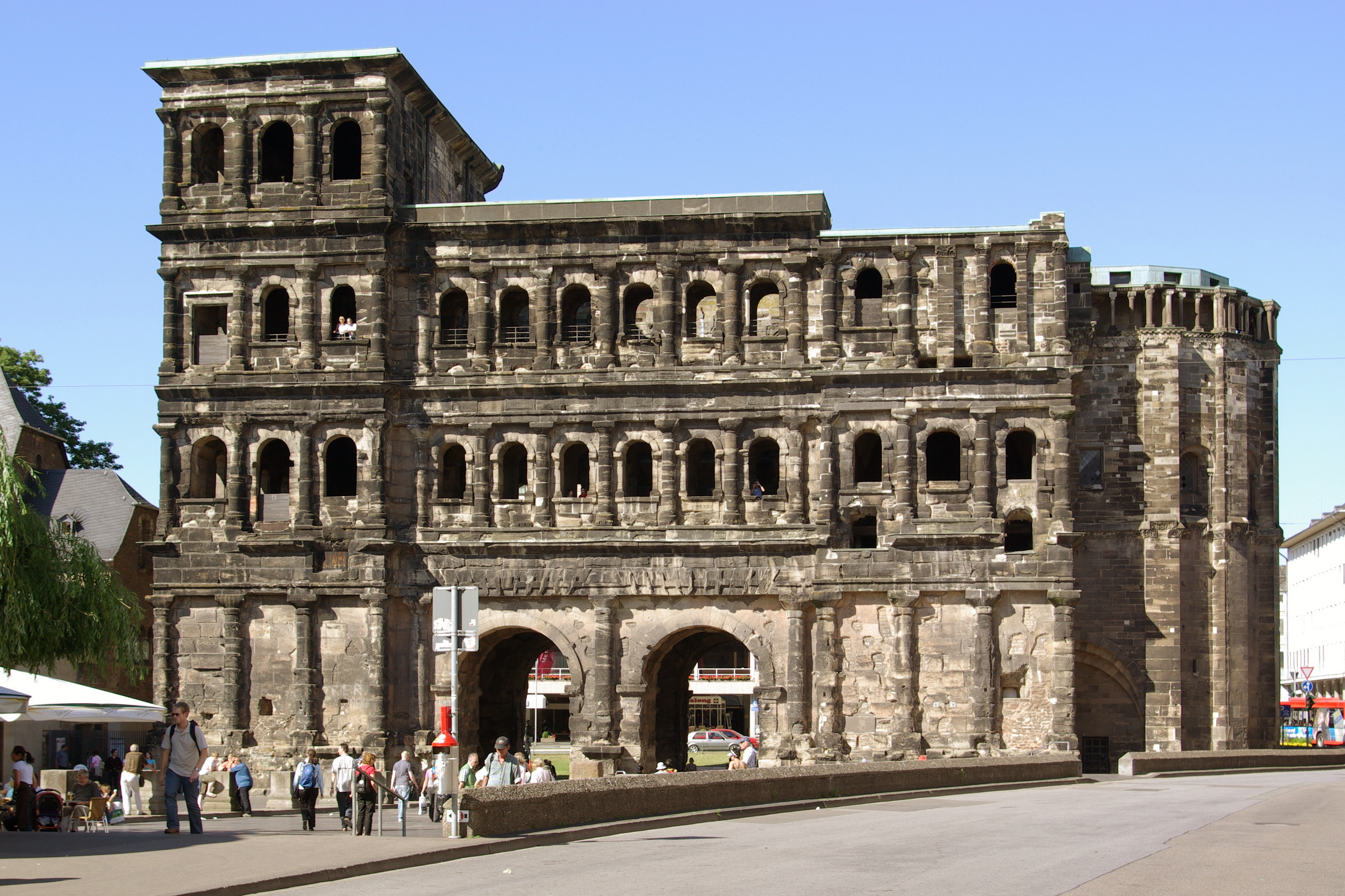
The Porta Nigra viewed from the town side (south).

=== Middle Ages ===
In the early Middle Ages the Roman city gates were no longer used for their original function and their stones were taken and reused for other buildings. Moreover, iron and lead braces were broken out of the walls of the Porta Nigra for reuse. Traces of this destruction are still clearly visible on the north side of the gate.

After 1028, the Greek monk Simeon lived as a hermit in the ruins of the Porta Nigra. After his death (1035) and sanctification, the Simeonstift monastery was built next to the Porta Nigra to honor him.

To save it from further destruction, the Porta Nigra was transformed into two superimposed churches with identical floor plans. The upper church was accessible to the monks and the lower church was open to the general public.

The church naves were created by extending the first and second floors over the inner courtyard. An apse was constructed onto the east tower. Additional levels and a spire were added to the western tower. The top floor of the eastern tower was removed, and a new clerestory level was built over the nave, east tower and apse. Windows of the western tower were enlarged to become entrance doors (still visible).

The ground floor with the large gates was buried inside a terrace, and a large staircase was constructed alongside the south side (the town side) up to the lower church. A small staircase led further up to the upper church.

An additional gate (the much smaller Simeon Gate) was built adjacent to the East side of the Porta Nigra and served as a city gate in medieval times.

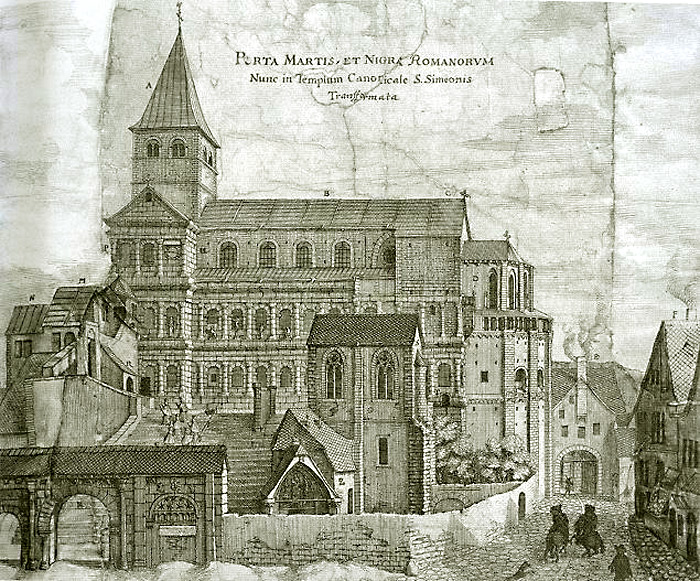
Porta Nigra (aka Porta Martis) in 1670

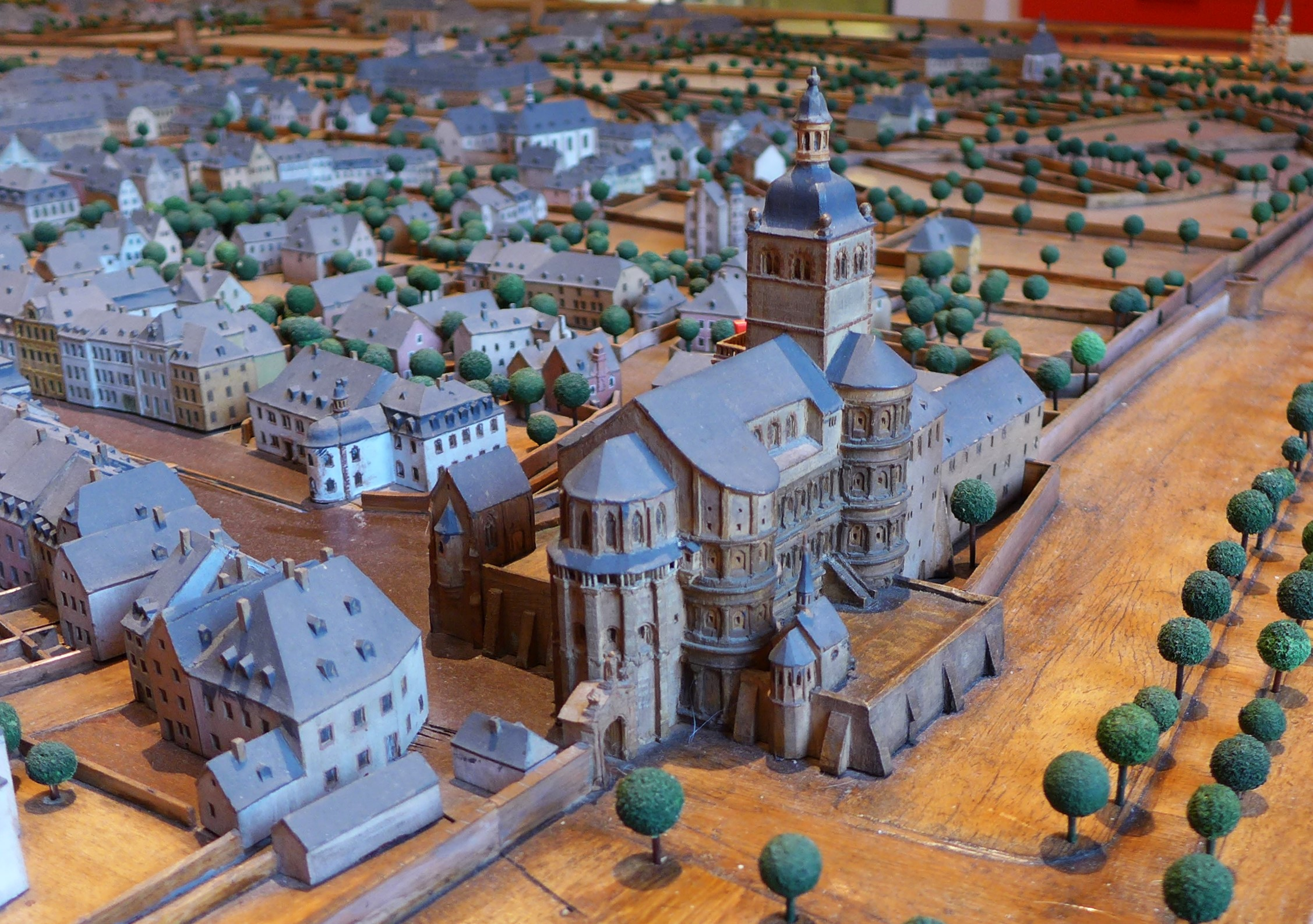
Model of St. Simeon Trier in the year 1800 viewed from the northeast.

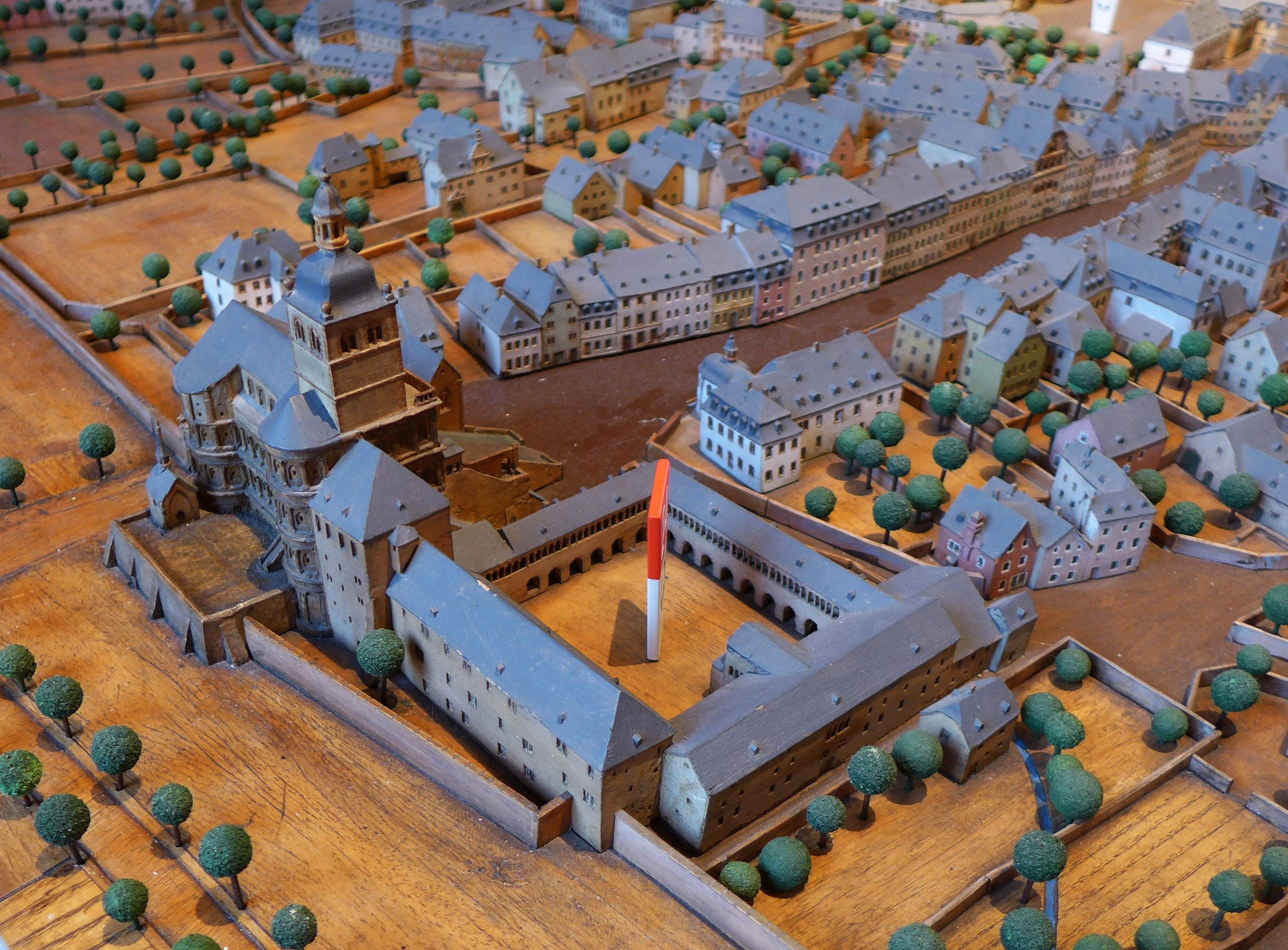
Model of St. Simeon Trier in the year 1800 viewed from the northwest.

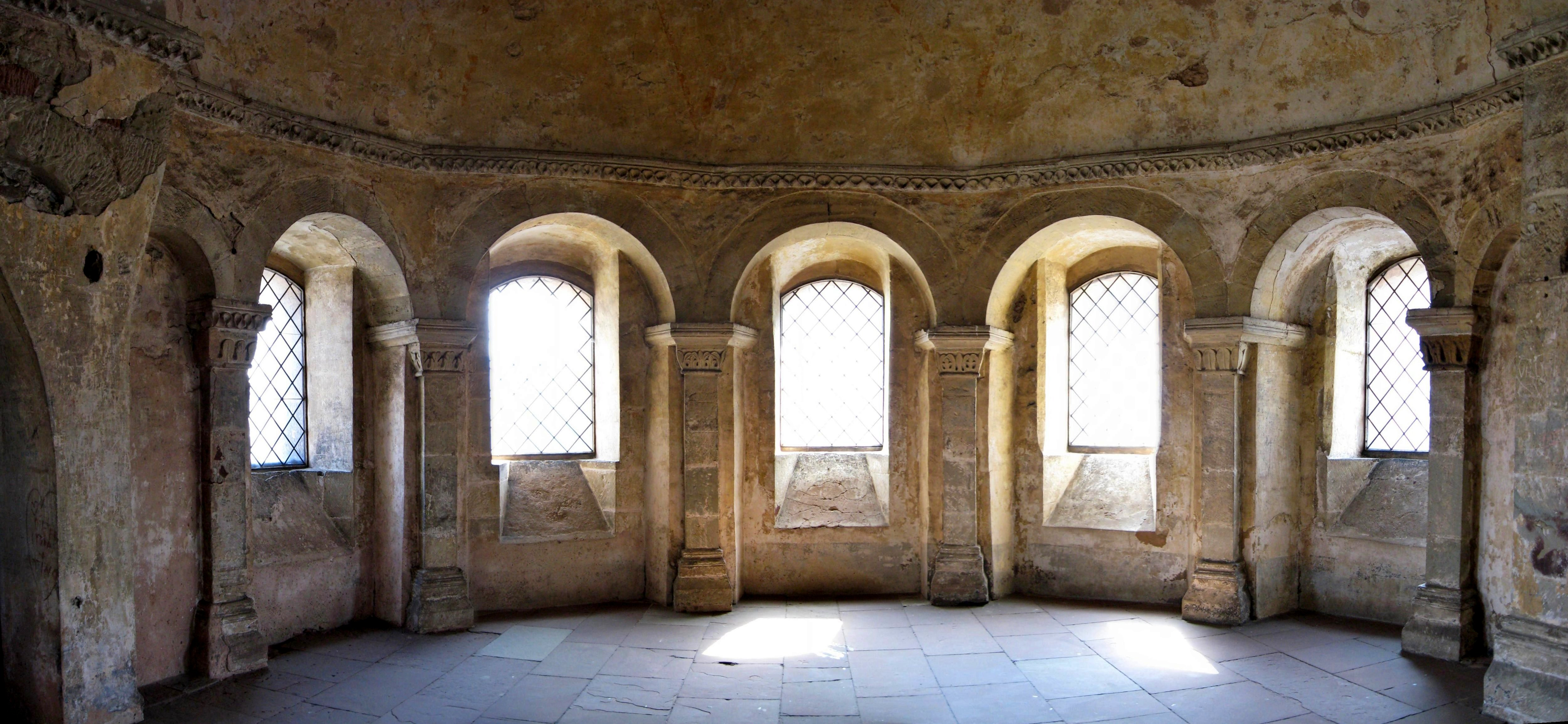
Apse of the lower church

=== Modern ===
In 1802, Napoleon Bonaparte dissolved the church in the Porta Nigra and the monastery beside it, along with the vast majority of Trier's numerous churches and monasteries. On his visit to Trier in 1804, Napoleon ordered that the Porta Nigra be converted back to its Roman form. The clerestory level and church tower were deconstructed, and the inner courtyard was reinstated. However, the apse was preserved in a truncated form, and the eastern tower was not rebuilt to its original height. The terrace surrounding the ground floor level was removed.

Local legend has it that Napoleon originally wanted to completely tear down the church, but locals convinced him that the church had actually been a Gaulish festival hall before being turned into a church. Another version of the story is that they told him about its Roman origins, persuading him to convert the gate back to its original form.

It was designated as part of the Roman Monuments, Cathedral of St Peter and Church of Our Lady in Trier UNESCO World Heritage Site in 1986 because of its testimony to the influence of Trier in the Roman Empire and its unique architecture as both a city gate and a double church.

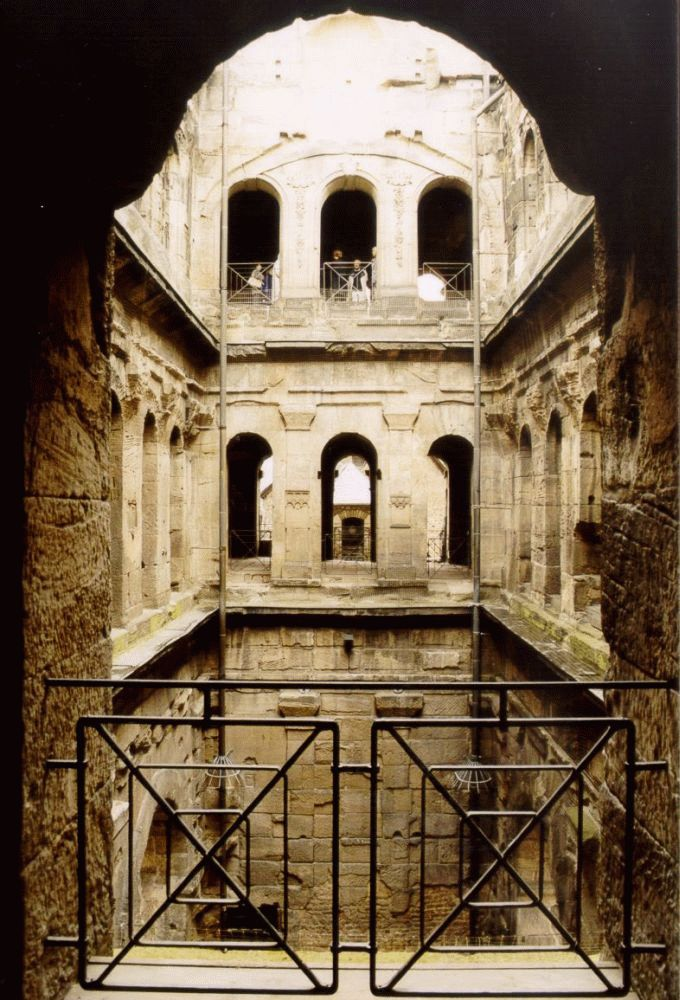
Inner court. The middle stories were converted into two churches by extending the floors over the inner court.

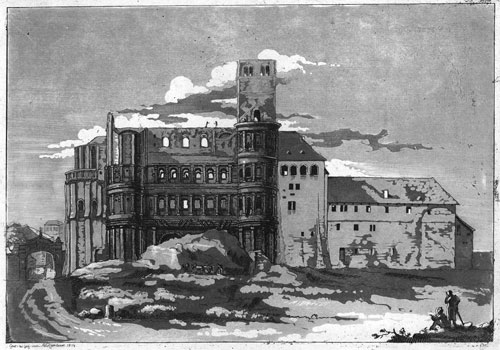
Porta Nigra during deconstruction of the Church of St. Simeon. Notice the main gates are still partially buried.

== Today ==
Generally the Porta Nigra is still in remarkable condition. Its modern appearance goes back almost unchanged to the reconstruction ordered by Napoleon, with a crowning cornice and parapet on its top. Roman columns line the last 100 m of the street leading to the gate from the south, positioned as they had been in Roman times to give the impression of the colonnade that once lined its route into the city.

The gate is closed to cars today, but stands right next to one of the main streets of Trier. Air pollution, particularly the exhaust fumes of passing cars, continues to darken and damage its stones. As of 2026, the gate is undergoing a restoration that is expected to continue until 2028.

The gate, including the upper floors, is open to visitors. In summer, tours are offered by a guide costumed as a centurion (a Roman army officer) in full armor.

New Trier Township in Cook County, Illinois, USA, is named after Trier, and New Trier Township High School's seal depicts the Porta Nigra.
