= Abbey of Saint-Acheul =

Abbey in Somme, France

- Abbaye de Saint-Acheul
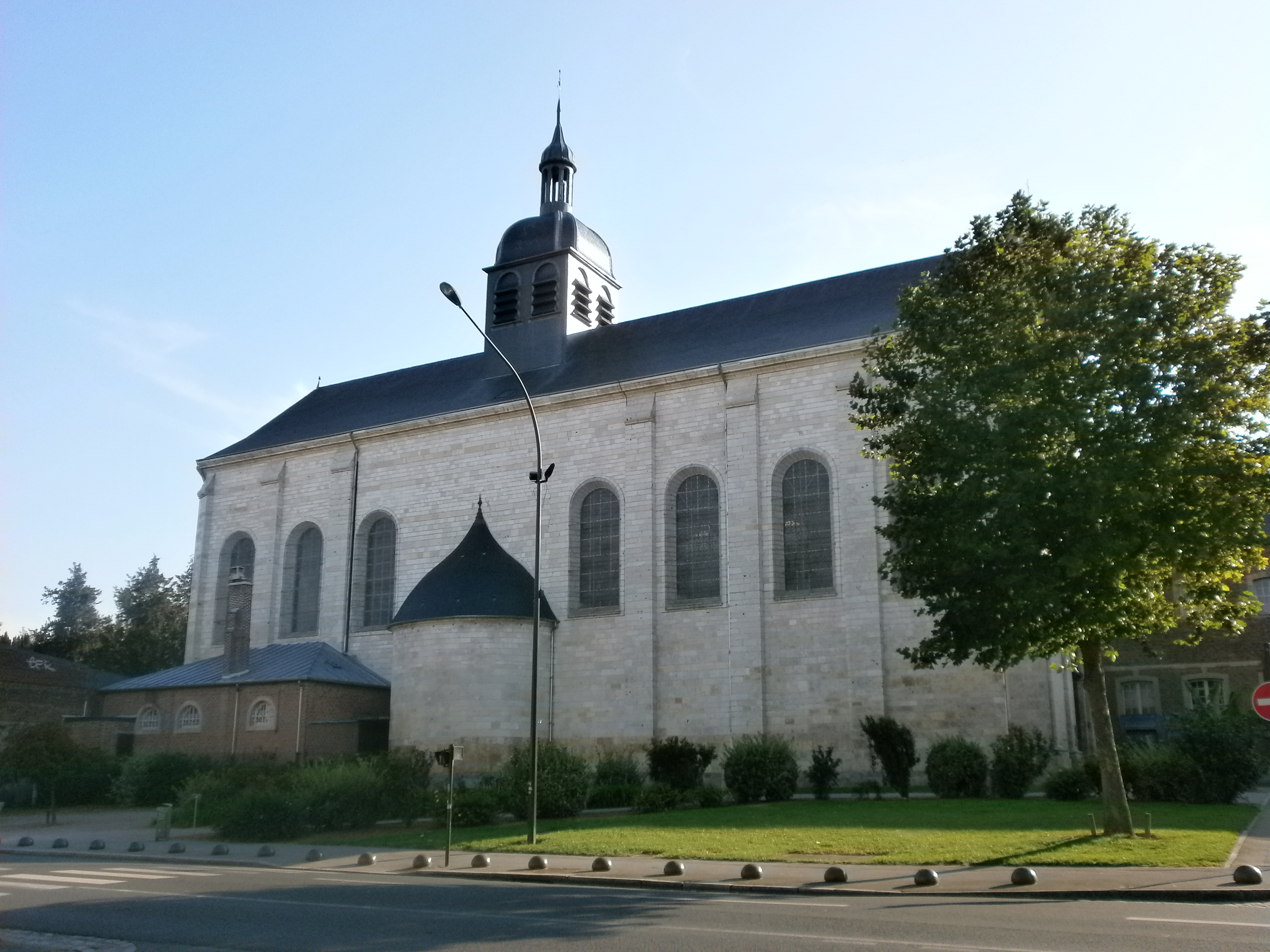
- Église Saint-Acheul

- Location within France

Monastery information
- Order: Canons Regular, Congregation of France from 1634
- Established: 1085
- Disestablished: 1790
- Mother house: Abbey of St Genevieve
- Diocese: Amiens

People
- Founders: Rorico, Bishop of Amiens

Architecture
- Status: Closed
- Heritage designation: Monument historique
- Designated date: 8 December 1969

Site
- Location: Amiens, Somme, France
- Coordinates: 49.88333°N 2.32442°E

The Abbey of Saint-Acheul (French: Abbaye de Saint-Acheul) was a monastery of Canons Regular in the Saint-Acheul district of Amiens, France. It was founded in the 11th century on the site of an ancient church, and was suppressed in 1790 during the French Revolution. The buildings, which date to the 18th century, were taken over by a college that was entrusted to the Jesuits in 1814. They are now occupied by the private Lycée Saint-Riquier. The abbey church is used as a parish church.

== Location ==
The church is on the chaussée Jules-Ferry, Amiens, Somme. The location was once a site of Druid sacrifices, later the site of a Roman temple.

== Church ==
An ancient church named Notre Dame des Martyrs, known as the first cathedral of Amiens, was founded in memory of Saint Firmin the Martyr. Later it became part of the Abbey of Notre Dame de Saint-Acheul. Modern historians have debated when and by whom the church was founded, but Bishop Rorico of Amiens (c. 1081–85) was confident that it was the oldest Christian building in Amiens and had been built by Saint Firmin the Confessor over the tombs of Saint Firmin the Martyr, Saint Acius and Saint Acheolus. Saint Firmin the Martyr was an evangelist and first Bishop of Amiens, who was martyred there in 287.

The oldest surviving vitae of the first bishop-saints of Amiens mentions the church. The life of Firmin the Martyr relates that after he had been executed the senator Faustinian took the body and buried it in his personal cemetery in "Abladana". His son Firmin the Confessor, later to be known as Saint-Acheul, built a church over the tomb and was also buried there. Saint Salvius, Bishop of Amiens in the 7th century, found the tombs of the two Saint Firmins and the martyrs Acius and Aciolus. He moved the four bodies to the eastern crypt of the cathedral.

The crypt under the church contains ancient tombs and bas-reliefs. It was discovered on 10 January 1697 during construction of a foundation for the main altar in the church. The monks claimed they had found the body of Saint Firmin, and said the relics in the Amiens Cathedral were not authentic. After lengthy controversy the relics in the cathedral were opened on 10 January 1715 and the 13th century inscriptions were taken to prove their authenticity. The vault of the 11th century church collapsed in 1751 and all the buildings were completely rebuilt in 1760. During the revolution the church became the parish church for the districts of La Neuville and Boutillerie. Under the Terror it was changed into stables. It was again made a parish church in 1844.

The church has a classical sober stone architecture. The interior has a "Jesuit" style with a single span of 43 by 10 metres (141 by 33 ft) and a vault that reaches 35 metres (115 ft). The facade has a large door surrounded by pilasters with Tuscan-style capitals. Higher up a bay and niches are arranged between pilasters with Doric capitals that support the triglyphic entablature, on which there is a triangular pediment. Under the choir there is a vault in the place where the body of Saint Firmin was miraculously discovered. The church holds several sarcophagi and 15th century bas-reliefs relating to the history of Saint Firmin. The church was protected as monument historique PA00116051 by decree of 8 December 1969. The church holds a noted statue of Notre Dame des Sept Douleurs (Our Lady of Seven Sorrows).

== Abbey ==
The town of Amiens was jointly governed from the mid-10th century by the counts of Amiens-Valois and the Bishop of Amiens. This continued until 1074 when Count Raoul IV died and his son Simon became a monk. Bishop Rorico of Amiens established canons at Saint-Acheul in 1085. The foundation charter records donations to Saint-Acheul by Count Enguerran of Boves and his vidame Eustache. It was issued in the first year of Enguerran's rule, and praises his restoration of law and order. Throughout the 12th century the priory received much support from the bishops of Amiens. A monastery for the Augustinian canons regular was built by Bishop Tierry in 1145.

The abbey bought land in the Neuville area in the 13th century and established vegetable gardens, from which it received payments from the cultivators. The plots were on drained marshland. Every year on a given date all the cultivators had to drain the canals around their plots and clean out all the wild plants that had been growing in the waterways and on their banks. The monastery was rebuilt in the 14th century. In 1634 it was united with the church of Saint Genevieve. The abbey was again rebuilt in the 17th–18th centuries.

The manuscript diaries of Pierre de L'Estoile (1546–1611) were deposited in the library of the abbey by his descendant Pierre Poussemthe de L'Estoile when he died in 1718. Pierre Poussemthe de L'Estoile was the abbot of Saint-Acheul. The diaries were used as sources for various historical works on the period of Henry III and Henry IV of France. (Note: The bookseller Pierre Mongie took possession of L'Estoile's manuscripts after the abbey was dissolved, and they were later acquired by the Royal library.) The abbey held a head of Saint John the Baptist, one of several such heads in churches of France before the revolution. It remained in use until 1790.

== Jesuit college ==
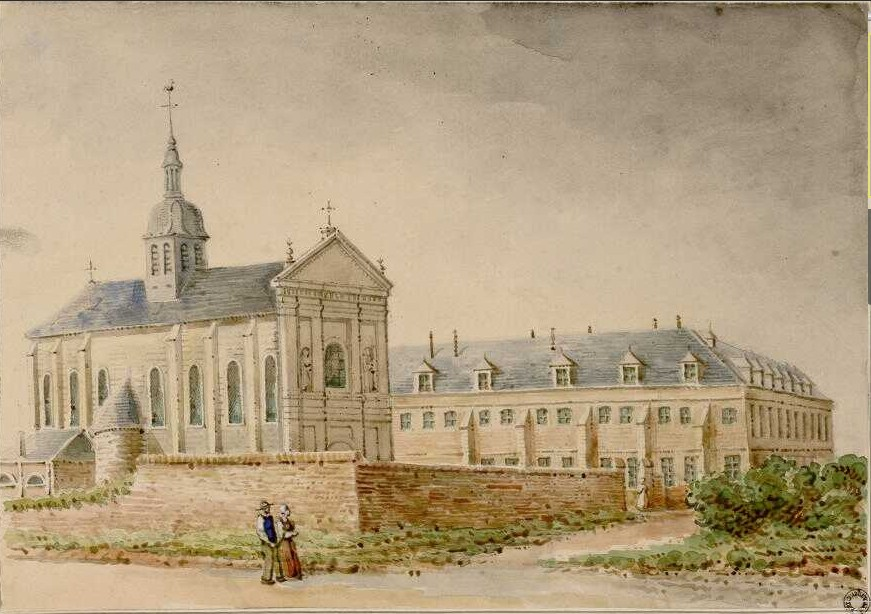
Church and abbey of Saint-Acheul in 1880

Louis Sellier, a layman who later became a Jesuit, founded a pensionnat at Amiens in 1797, which he gave to the Fathers of the Faith including Jean Nicolas Loriquet in 1803. The pensionnat was suppressed in 1812, but was succeeded in 1816 after the fall of the Empire by the minor seminary of Saint-Acheul, staffed by the former teachers of the pensionnat who had become Jesuits after the restoration of that order. The seminary was crowded into the old abbey and an old auxiliary building, with a 3-story building thrown up in 1818 to hold a study hall and dormitory, and two nearby houses. An ancient stable on the farm beside the abbey was also used as a study hall. The seminary was home to almost 900 resident students. There were almost 60 Jesuits and perhaps as many lay workers. Despite the austere conditions, the college was well off compared to most such establishments. In 14 years the seminary educated 70 Jesuits, 550 priests and 8 bishops.

Alumni of the Jesuit college include:

- Augustin de Backer (1809–73), Belgian Jesuit and bibliographer
- Charles Cahier (1807–82), French antiquarian
- Célestin Joseph Félix (1810–91), French Jesuit and preacher
- Ivan Gagarin (1814–82), Russian Jesuit, founding editor of Études
- Peter Hasslacher (1810–76), German Jesuit missionary
- Louis Lambillotte (1796–1855), Belgian Jesuit, composer and palaeographer of Church music
- Francis Sylvester Mahony (1804–66), an Irish humorist and journalist
- Félix Martin (1804–86), antiquary, historiographer, architect, and educationist
- Carlos Sommervogel (1834–1902), French Jesuit scholar, author of the Bibliothèque de la Compagnie de Jésus
- Charles Vilain XIIII (1803–78), Belgian politician

The Jesuit college was closed in 1830. Later the building was used as a hospital. As of 2017 the abbey was occupied by a private lycée.

== See also ==
- List of Jesuit sites

== Sources ==
- Chartier, Roger (2014-07-14), The Culture of Print: Power and the Uses of Print in Early Modern Europe, Princeton University Press, ISBN 978-1-4008-6033-3
- "Eglise Saint-Acheul", base Mérimée (in French), Ministère de la Culture, 13 October 2015
- Hamilton, Tom (2017), Pierre de L'Estoile and His World in the Wars of Religion, Oxford University Press, ISBN 978-0-19-880009-5
- Hunt, John Dixon; Wolschke-Bulmahn, Joachim (1993), The Vernacular Garden, Dumbarton Oaks, ISBN 978-0-88402-201-5
- Jehan Sauval, Ancienne abbaye de Saint-Acheul. Hôpital Saint-Acheul n° 10 (vers 1917)
- Larcher, C., L'église Saint Acheul
- Murray, John (1864), A Handbook for Travellers in France: Being a Guide to Normandy, Brittany; the Rivers Seine, Loire, Rhône, and Garonne; the French Alps, Dauphiné, Provence, the Pyrenees, and Nice ..., J. Murray
- Ott, John S. (2015), Bishops, Authority and Community in Northwestern Europe, c.1050–1150, Cambridge University Press, ISBN 978-1-107-01781-8
- Padberg, John W. (1969), Colleges in Controversy: The Jesuit Schools in France from Revival to Suppression, 1815-1880, Harvard University Press, ISBN 978-0-674-14160-5
- Passer, Nadia (9 January 2017), "Abbey of Saint-Acheul", letterindra.com (in Danish), archived from the original on 28 September 2017
- Santoro, Nicholas J. (2011-08-12), Mary In Our Life: Atlas of the Names and Titles of Mary, The Mother of Jesus, and Their Place in Marian Devotion, iUniverse, ISBN 978-1-4620-4022-3
