= Peter Hasslacher =

Peter Hasslacher (14 August 1810 – 5 July 1876) was a German Roman Catholic preacher. He was one of the many Jesuit missionaries who strove throughout Germany, from Freiburg to Berlin and Danzig, to reawaken and strengthen the country's Catholic forces after the stormy year of 1846.

== Life ==
Hasslacher was born in Coblenz. His youth was somewhat tempestuous. As a medical student in the university in Bonn, in 1831, he identified himself with the German student movement, which was looked upon as revolutionary; and he was compelled, in consequence, to undergo seven years confinement in Berlin, Magdeburg, and Ehrenbreitstein.

During these years he underwent a spiritual change, and in particular, by studying the Church Fathers, stirred his mind with theological knowledge; after his liberation he entered, in the spring of 1840, the novitiate of the Society of Jesus, at Saint-Acheul, France. He was ordained to the priesthood on 1 September 1844, and then preached with much success in the Strasbourg Cathedral, until the year 1849.

It was at this time that the popular missions were inaugurated in Germany, but Hasslacher's delicate health could not long withstand the physical exertions entailed. Instead, as he explains in an 1860 letter, Hasslacher began giving conferences in all the larger cities in the Rhine and Westphalia.

His strength failing, he was sent in 1863 to conduct, in Paris, the St. Joseph's Mission for German Catholics, but even this labour became after ten years too much of a tax on his physical powers so that he was compelled to abandon it and to take up similar but lighter duties at Poitiers. After a year he was brought back, very ill, to Paris, where he died.
