= Auguste Carayon =

French author (1813–1874)

Auguste Carayon (31 March 1813 – 15 May 1874) was a French Jesuit author and bibliographer.

== Biography ==
Carayon was born in Saumur, France in 1813; he joined the Society of Jesus in 1848, and was at various times librarian and procurator. Between 1864 and 1874 he edited many historical works, and is considered a leading authority upon the history of his order, especially in New France, the area colonized by France in North America.

Carayon worked with Augustin and Alois de Backer and Carlos Sommervogel.

Carayon died at Poitiers in 1874.

== Works ==
His principal works were:

- Bibliographie historique de la Compagnie de Jésus (Paris, 1864)
- Documents inédits concernant la Compagnie de Jésus (Poitiers, 1863-1874, 18 vols)
- Première mission des Jésuites au Canada (Paris, 1864)
- Bannissement des Jésuites de la Louisiane (1865)
- Établissement de la Compagnie de Jésus à Brest par Louis XIV (Paris, 1865)
- Les prisons du Marquis de Pombal (1865)
- Notes historiques sur les Parlements et les Jésuites au XVIIIe siècle (Paris, 1867)

He was also the author of several devotional treatises published between 1854 and 1863.
