= Aceolus and Acius =

Early Christian martyrs in Gaul

Saint Acheolus and Acius
- Died: c. 290
- Venerated in: Amiens, France
- Feast: 1 May

Saints Acheolus (or Acheul) and Acius were early Christian martyrs in Gaul. They are associated with Amiens, where Acheolus's name was given to an ancient church, later an abbey.

== Butler's account ==
The martyrologist Alban Butler wrote in his The lives of the fathers, martyrs, and other principal saints (1821),

May 1 – SS. Acius and Acheolus, Martyrs of Amiens

[Called in French SS. Ach and Acheul.] THEY seem to have suffered about the year 290 (Note: Another source says Acius was a subdeacon who was martyred in 303 during the persecutions of the Roman emperor Diocletian.), and are honoured in the Gallican Martyrologies, and especially at Amiens, on the 1st of May. See Molanus in Auctario Usuardi, and Henschenius 1st of May, and an old Martyrology under the name of St. Jerom, quoted by him.

The church of St. Acheul, without the walls of Amiens, was originally the cathedral; but this being removed by St. Salvius to our Lady’s in the city, the church of St. Acheul became dependent on it. A community of regular canons was there erected in 1145. It is now a member of the reformed congregation of St. Genevieve. In digging foundations for a new church, five very ancient tombs were found, which have been the subject of many dissertations, especially whether one is not that of St. Firminus, bishop and confessor, whose relics are enshrined in the cathedral.

== Miscellaneous ==
Acheolus and Achius are honored on 1 May. The emblem of Acheolus is an instrument resembling a wimble.

According to E. Cobham Brewer in A Dictionary of Miracles: Imitative, Realistic, and Dogmatic (1884),

Christ Himself appears to St. Honoré and administers to him the eucharist (sixth century). St. Honoré, on one occasion, went to St. Acheolus to assist in saying mass in the chapel of the Virgin, when Christ Himself appeared to him visibly, in human form, and administered to him the holy elements with His own bands, "lui accordant ainsi la même grâce qu'il avait faite aux Apôtres, le soir de sa Passion." In memory of this event, a divine hand is blazoned in the arms of the abbey of St. Acheolus.—Les Petits Hollandistes, vol. v. p. 676.

The saint's name survives in the Abbey of Saint-Acheul in the Saint-Acheul district of Amiens, and in the commune of Saint-Acheul to the north of Amiens,

== Sources ==
- Brewer, Ebenezer Cobham (1884), A Dictionary of Miracles: Imitative, Realistic, and Dogmatic, Chatto and Windus This article incorporates text from this source, which is in the public domain.
- Butler, Alban (1821), The lives of the fathers, martyrs, and other principal saints, vol. 5 This article incorporates text from this source, which is in the public domain.
- Drake, Maurice; Drake, Wilfred (1916-01-01), Saints and their emblems, Dalcassian Publishing Company, GGKEY:PR7E6H0KXDH
- "Saint Acius of Amiens", saints.sqpn, archived from the original on 2008-10-11
