= Carlos Sommervogel =

French scholar (1834–1902)

Carlos Sommervogel SJ (8 January 1834 – 4 March 1902) was a French Jesuit scholar. He was author of the monumental Bibliothèque de la Compagnie de Jésus, which served as one of the major references for the editors of the Catholic Encyclopedia.

== Life ==
Born in Strasbourg, Sommervogel, was the fourth son of Marie-Maximillian-Joseph Sommervogel and Hortense Blanchard. After studying at the lycée of Strasbourg, he entered the Jesuit novitiate at Issenheim, Alsace, 2 February 1853, and was sent later to the College of Saint-Acheul, Amiens, to complete his literary studies.

In 1856, he was appointed assistant prefect of discipline and sub-librarian in the College of the Immaculate Conception, Rue Vaugirard, Paris. Here he discovered his literary vocation. The Bibliothèque des écrivains de la Compagnie de Jésus of Augustin and Aloys de Backer was then in course of publication. Sommervogel, noting its occasional errors and omissions, made a systematic examination of the whole work.

Four years later, Augustin de Backer, seeing his list of addenda and errata, a manuscript of 800 pages, containing over 10,000 entries, obtained leave to make use of it. Sommervogel continued at Rue Vaugirard until 1865, continuing his course of philosophy meanwhile.

He then studied theology at Amiens, where he was ordained in September 1866. From 1867 until 1879 he was one of the staff on the Jesuit publication Études, being managing editor from 1871 to 1879. During the Franco-Prussian War he served as chaplain in Faidherbe's army, and was decorated in 1871 with a bronze medal for his self-sacrifice.

Aloys de Backer in the revised edition of his Bibliothèque (1869–1876) gave Sommervogel's name as co-author, due to the latter's significant contributions.

From 1880 to 1882 Sommervogel was assistant to his provincial superior.

Sommervogel died in Paris in 1902.

== Works ==
Before 1882 he had never had any special opportunity of pursuing his study; all his bibliographical work had been done in his spare moments. In 1884 he published his Dictionnaire des ouvrages anonymes et pseudonymes publiés par des religieux de la Compagnie de Jésus. In 1885 he was appointed successor to the de Backers and went to Louvain. He determined to recast and enlarge their work and after five years issued the first volume of the first part (Brussels and Paris, 1890); by 1900 the ninth volume had appeared; the tenth, an index of the first nine, which comprised the bibliographic part of the Bibliothèque was unfinished at the time of his death but was later completed by Joseph Brucker, from which these details were drawn.

Sommervogel had intended to compile a second, or historical, part of his work, which was to be a revision of Auguste Carayon's Bibliographie historique. He was a man of exemplary virtue, giving freely to all the fruit of his devoted labours, and content to live for years a busy obscure life to which duty called him, until his superiors directed him to devote himself to his favorite study during the last fifteen years of his life. He re-edited a number of works by old writers of the Society of Jesus and, in addition to his articles in the Études, wrote Table methodique des Mémoires de Trévoux (3 vols., 1885) and Moniteur bibliographique de la Compagnie de Jésus (1894-1901).
