= Symeon of Trier =

German monk and recluse (d. 1035)

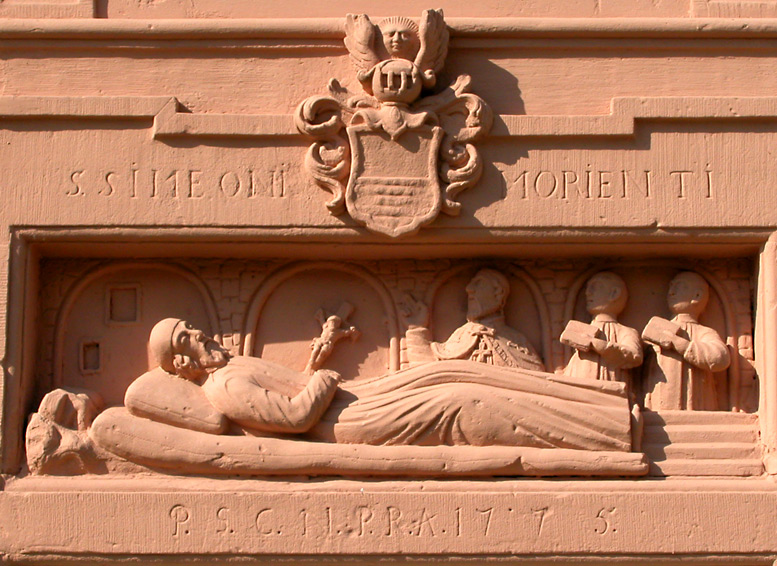
Tomb of St. Simeon of Trier

Saint Simeon of Trier (or Simeon of Syracuse), also written as Symeon (Greek: Ὁ Ὅσιος Συμεὼν ὁ Πεντάγλωσσος ὁ Σιναΐτης, Sicilian: San Simeuni di Saraùsa), was a monk and recluse who died in Germany in 1035. He is venerated as a saint in the Eastern Orthodox Church with his feast day on 1 May, as well as in the Catholic Church, particularly in Germany.

== Life ==
Simeon was born in the late 10th century in Syracuse, Sicily, to a Greek father and a Calabrian mother, during the period of Arab rule of the island. His father, who had been a soldier of the Byzantine army, sent him to Constantinople when he was seven years old to learn to read and write their native Greek language. As he grew older, Symeon decided to lead a life of religion, so he set out on a pilgrimage to the Church of the Holy Sepulchre in Jerusalem. Afterwards, for seven years, he became a guide, leading pilgrims to the holy places, before tiring of this life and preferring instead to live as a recluse.

Having heard of a holy recluse who lived in a tower on the bank of the Jordan River, Simeon went to work as his servant, living in the lower room of the tower, while learning from his new master how to practise the life of a recluse. Forced to depart, he realised after reading and re-reading the Lives of the Fathers (Vitae patrum), that in order to become a recluse he should train for a time in a monastery. As a result, he entered the Monastery of the Virgin Mary in Bethlehem and became a monk. After two years there, he transferred to the famed Saint Catherine's Monastery on Mount Sinai in Egypt. While he was a member of that community, he was ordained as a deacon.

After serving the brethren for some years there, Simeon gained the abbot's permission to depart to live as a hermit, settling alone in a small cave on the shore of the Red Sea. A monk from the monastery brought him bread every Sunday, but after two years, being disturbed by passing sailors and seeing how worn out the monk who brought his food had become, he decided to return to the monastery. On the orders of his abbot he then restored a ruined monastery on the peak of Mount Sinai, but upon his return he still conceived a desire to live as a hermit, so he absconded and found a spot in the desert. The abbot soon discovered him, and called him back to the monastery.

In 1026 the abbot sent Simeon to Rouen in France on monastery business with Richard II, Duke of Normandy. He duly set out, but while travelling down the Nile his boat was attacked by pirates, who butchered the crew. Simeon barely escaped with his life, diving into the water. When he swam ashore he had no idea whether the people in the little village he reached were Christian or not, because he was unable to communicate with them in any of the languages he spoke (namely Coptic, Syrian, Arabic, Greek and Latin).

Eventually Simeon made his way to Antioch, where he joined a group of some 700 pilgrims returning from Jerusalem, among whom was the German abbot, Eberwin, of the Abbey of Tholey. Simeon joined the group, but when they reached Belgrade the Hungarian officials barred them from going any farther, so they returned via Rome to France. Simeon finally reached Rouen, only to find that Duke Richard was dead. He fulfilled his mission and then traveled around France and Germany, visiting Abbot Eberwin in Tholey and going to Trier.

In the meantime Poppo, Archbishop of Trier (1016–1047), was planning a pilgrimage to Jerusalem, and, after meeting Simeon, invited him to accompany him on the journey. They set out and reached Jerusalem. Simeon, however, chose not to return to his own monastery in Egypt, instead accompanying Poppo back to Trier, a trip which lasted from 1028–1030.

After their return, Simeon asked Poppo if he could live as a recluse in the great Roman gate of the city, the Porta Nigra. Poppo agreed and conducted a ceremony on 29 November 1030, the feast day of St. Andrew, before all the clergy and people in which Symeon was enclosed in a cell, high in the gate tower.

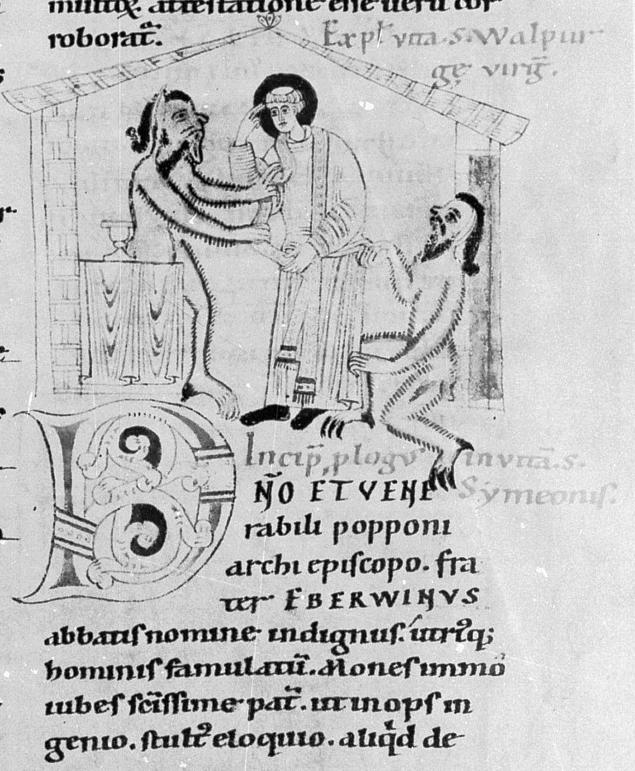
St. Simeon, in the vestments of a deacon, being attacked by demons

Shortly after he was enclosed, 'dead and buried to the world' for his love of God, a great flood ravaged the city and country round about. The people now thought that Symeon was a sorcerer whose devilry had caused the flood, so they pelted his cell with stones, breaking the window. Even so, Symeon persisted with his prayers and fasts, allegedly beating off demonic attacks, eating a sparse diet of bread, water and beans, and praying upright with his arms outstretched, lest in lying down he fall asleep. He died on 1 June 1035, and was buried in his cell, just as he had insisted.

== Veneration ==
Within a month miracles were being reported at his tomb, and a ladder was set up so that sick and needy pilgrims could climb up to his shrine.

At the urging of Poppo, Abbot Eberwin wrote an account of his life and early miracles in the very same year he died - as Maurice Coens has shown. Archbishop Poppo swiftly sent this to Pope Benedict IX, who responded with an official bull of canonization. Poppo then founded a monastery at the site of Symeon's life and tomb. When Poppo died in 1047, he was buried there.

He was canonized in 1042 by Pope Benedict IX. Many more miracles were recorded subsequently, and the fame of St Symeon spread far and wide.

== See also ==
- Saints canonized by Pope Benedict IX

== Sources ==
- Eberwin, ‘De sancto Symeone, recluso in porta Trevirensi’, Acta Sanctorum, Jun 1, cols 0089A-0101E.
- Maurice Coens, ‘Un document inédit sur le culte de S. Syméon, moine d’orient et reclus a Trèves’, Analecta Bollandiana 68 (1950), 181–96.
