= May 15 (Eastern Orthodox liturgics) =

Day in the Eastern Orthodox liturgical calendar

Eastern Orthodox liturgical calendar
May 14	May 15	May 16
May 15 O.S. ≍ May 28 N.S. May 15 N.S ≍ May 2 O.S.

An Eastern Orthodox cross

May 15 in Eastern Orthodox liturgical calendars is a feast day and a day of commemoration of saints and martyrs. Although some Orthodox churches use the Revised Julian Calendar and others use the traditional Julian calendar, the fixed commemorations for their respective May 15 are broadly the same, no matter which calendar is used. (Note: Despite the dates being the same, the days to which they refer typically differ by 13 days. The notation Old Style or O.S. is sometimes used to indicate a date in the traditional Julian Calendar (the "Old Calendar"). The notation New Style or N.S. indicates a date in the Revised Julian calendar (the "New Calendar").)

== Saints ==
- The Seven Apostolic Men, Martyr Bishops, ordained in Rome by Saints Peter and Paul, and sent to evangelize Spain (1st century):

- Saints Torquatus, Ctesiphon, Secundus, Indaletius, Caecilius, Hesychius, and Euphrasius.

- Saint Achillius (Achillios), Bishop of Larissa (330)
- Saint Pachomius the Great, founder of cenobitic monasticism (348)
- Saint Silvanus of Tabennisi, disciple of Saint Pachomius the Great (in the Thebaid) (4th century)
- Saint Pyrrhus of Breti, one of Thirteen Assyrian Fathers (6th century)
- Saint Barbarus the Myrrh-gusher of Greece (c. 820– 829)

== Pre-Schism Western saints ==
- Martyrs Cassius, Victorinus, Maximus, and their companions, in the Auvergne, Clermont in France (c. 264) (Note: A group of martyrs in Clermont in Auvergne in France, who suffered at the hands of Chrocas, the leader of invading Teutonic barbarians.)
- Saint Eutychius of Ferento, Bishop, Martyr (270)
- Martyr Simplicius of Olbia, Bishop, in Sardinia (c. 284–305)
- Virgin recluse Caesarea of Otranto.
- Saint Liberator, Bishop, Martyr. (Note: See: (in Italian) San Liberatore. Wikipedia. (Italian Wikipedia).) (Note: The exact origins and significance of Saint Liberator remain unclear. He lived in an indefinite period and in an unspecified territory of the Roman Empire, and was a victim of anti-Christian persecution. Although the Latin name 'Liberator' , is the same as the Greek word 'Eleutherius' — which could suggest a possible conflation with Greek Saints named Eleutherius — nevertheless the origins of Saint Liberator are not explicitly detailed in the available sources.)
- Saint Reticius, bishop of Autun (4th century)
- Saint Hilary of Galeata (Hilary of Tuscany), founder of the monastery called Galeata, later known as Sant'Ilaro (Sant'Ellero di Galeata) (558)
- Saint Colmán of Oughaval (Colman mac Ua Laoighse, Colman Mc O'Laoighse), a disciple of St Columba and St Fintan of Clonenagh (6th century) (Note: He founded and was abbot of a monastery in Oughaval in Ireland. He is still venerated at the nearby Orthodox church at Stradbally which is dedicated to him.)
- Virgin-martyr Dymphna of Geel, Flanders, and Hieromartyr Gerebern, Presbyter (c. 650)
- Saint Waldalenus, founder of Bèze Abbey in France (7th century)
- Saint Bercthun (Bertin), a disciple of St John of Beverley and first Abbot of Beverley in England (733)
- Saint Bertha of Bingen (c. 757), and her son Saint Rupert of Bingen (732)
- Saint Witesind of Córdoba, martyr (855)
- Saint Hallvard Vebjørnsson of Husaby, Norway (1043) (see also: May 14 - West)

== Post-Schism Orthodox saints ==
- Saint Panegyrios of Cyprus (Panigerios, Panegyrius), Wonderworker of Malounta. (Note: "He practised ascesis in the village of Malounta, in the diocese of Leucosia in Cyprus." It is unknown when Saint Panegyrios lived, but from his Divine Service it seems that he may have lived during the period of the Arab raids (c. 7th-12th centuries), when different parts of Cyprus had come under Arab rule, at different periods. He taught the Christian way to the Christians and discouraged them from converting to Islam by telling them that Islam as a religion was a delusion.)
- Saint Anastasia of Latra.
- Saint Isaiah of Rostov, Bishop and Wonderworker (1090)
- Saint Isaiah of the Kiev Caves, Wonderworker (1115)
- Saint Andrew the Hermit, of Mt. Kalana, Epirus, Wonderworker (c. 1237–1271)
- Saint Pachomius of Nerekhta, Abbot (1384), (Note: See: (in Russian) Пахомий Нерехтский. Википедии. (Russian Wikipedia).) and Saint Silvanus of Nerekhta (14th century)
- Saint Cali of Anatolia (14th century)
- Saint Euphrosynus of Pskov (Eleazar), Abbot and Wonderworker (1481)

- Saint Serapion of Pskov, disciple of St Euphrosynus of Pskov (1481) (Note: See also: September 8.)
- Saint Ignatius, Charalampius and Pamphilus, brothers and disciples of Euphrosynus of Pskov (15th century)

- Saint Pachomius of Keno Lake Monastery (1525) (Note: See: (in Russian) Пахомий Кенский. Википедии. (Russian Wikipedia).) (see also: January 31)
- Saint Demetrius of Moscow the Wonderworker, Slain Crown Prince (1591)
- Saint James of Putna, Metropolitan of Moldavia (1778)
- Saint Elias (Chebotarev) of Verkhoturye, Schemamonk (1900)
- Saint Arethas (Katargin) of Valaam and Verkhoturye, Archimandrite (1903)

=== New martyrs and confessors ===
- New Hieromartyrs:

- Archbishop Pachomius (Kedrov) of Chernigov (1938), (Note: See: (in Russian) Пахомий (Кедров). Википедии. (Russian Wikipedia).)
- his brother, Archbishop Abercius (Kedrov) of Zhitomir (1937),
- their father, Priest Nicholas Kedrov (1936),
- their brother-in-law, Priest Vladimir Zagarsky (1937)

== Other commemorations ==
- Discovery of the revered icon of Kamoulianos "Acheiropoieta" ("made without human hands"). (Note: The commemoration of this feast is included in the Codex Athous Lavrensis (8th/9th century))
- Translation of the sacred relics of the Holy Apostle Titus of Crete, from Venice (which had taken the relics in 1669), back to the Greek Orthodox Archdiocese of Crete (1966)
- Uncovering of the relics (1846) of Saint Tikhon, Bishop of Voronezh, wonderworker of Zadonsk (1783) (Note: See also: May 14 - Slavic.)
- Uncovering of the relics (1991) of Saint Arsenius of Konevits (1447) (Note: See: (in Russian) Арсений Коневский. Википедии. (Russian Wikipedia).)
- Uncovering of the relics (2012) of Saint Elias (Ganzha) of Makeevka (1946)

== Icon gallery ==
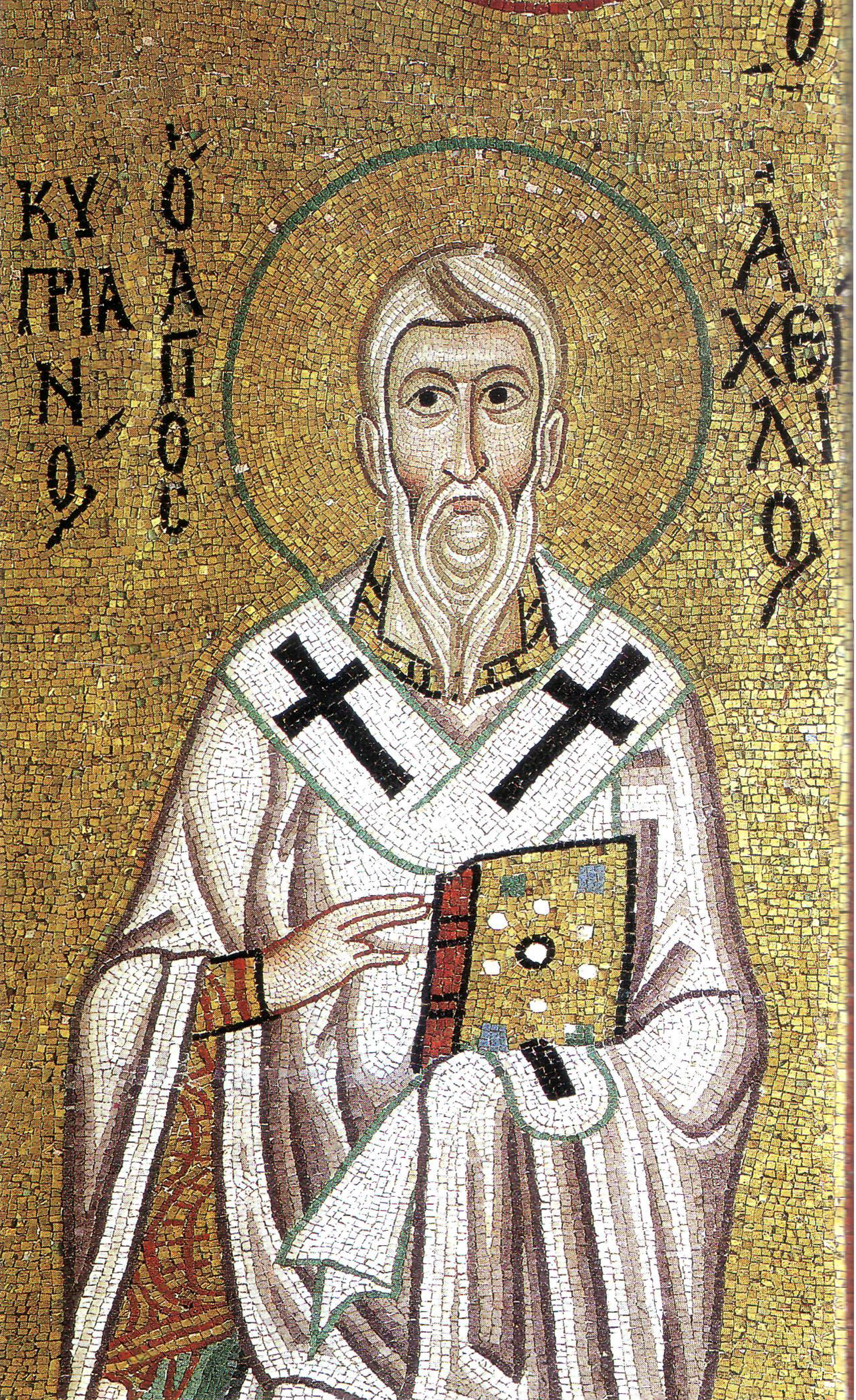
St. Achillius (Achillios), Bishop of Larissa.

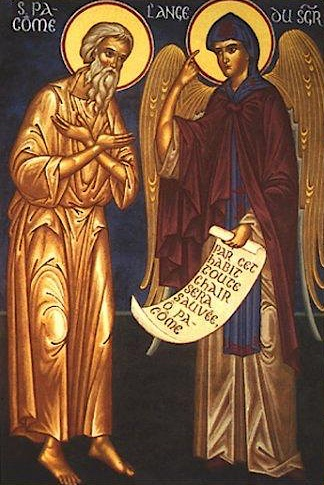
St. Pachomius the Great.

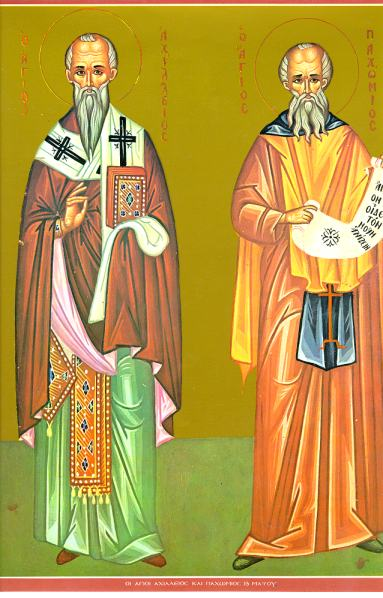
Sts. Achillius of Larissa and Pachomius the Great.

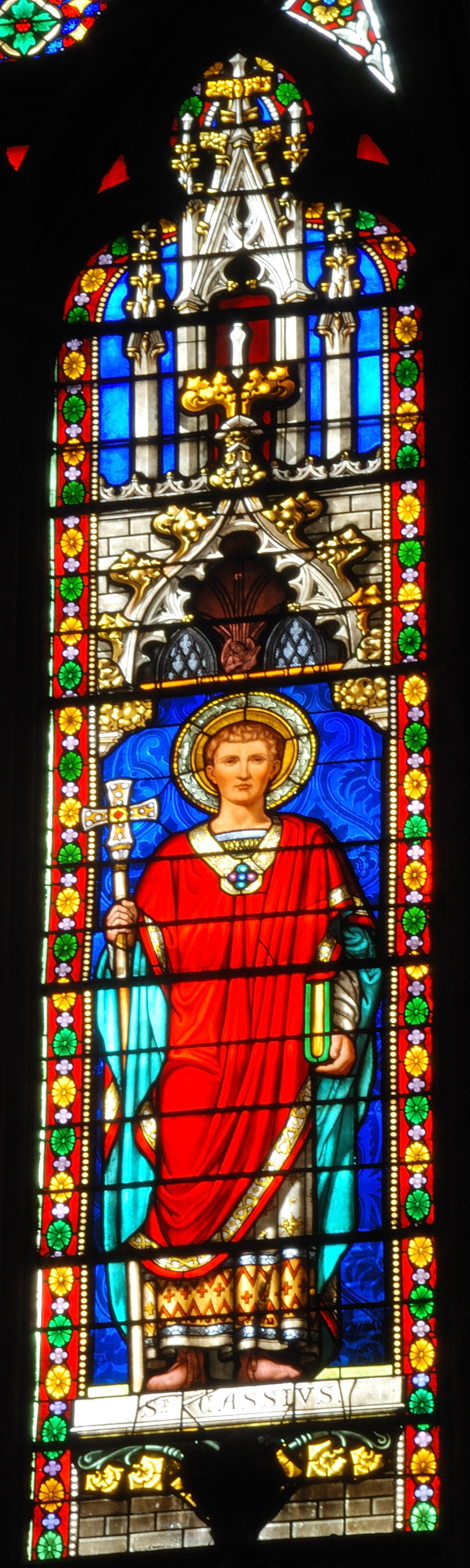
St. Cassius of Clermont.

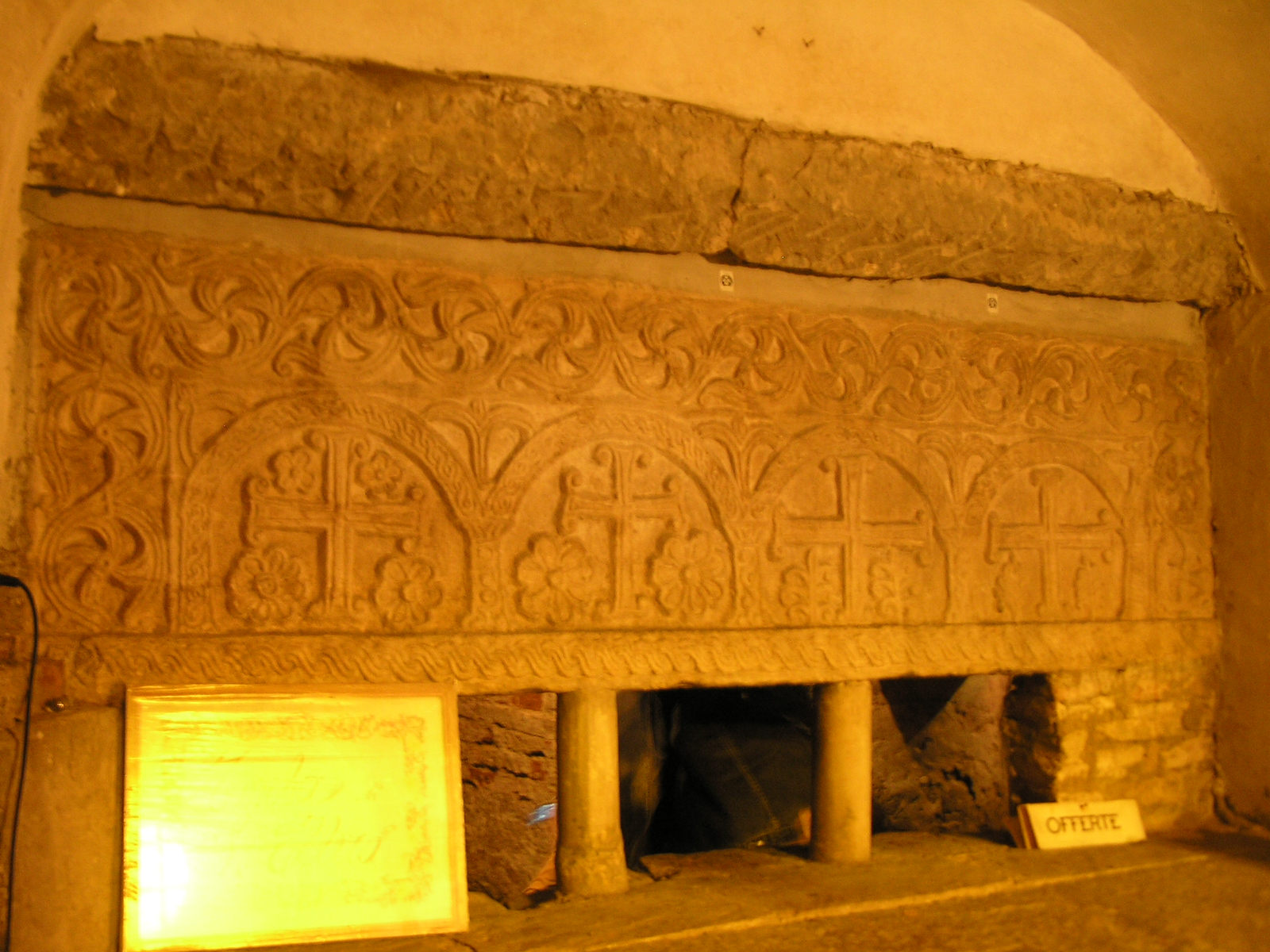
Tomb of Saint Hilary of Galeata.

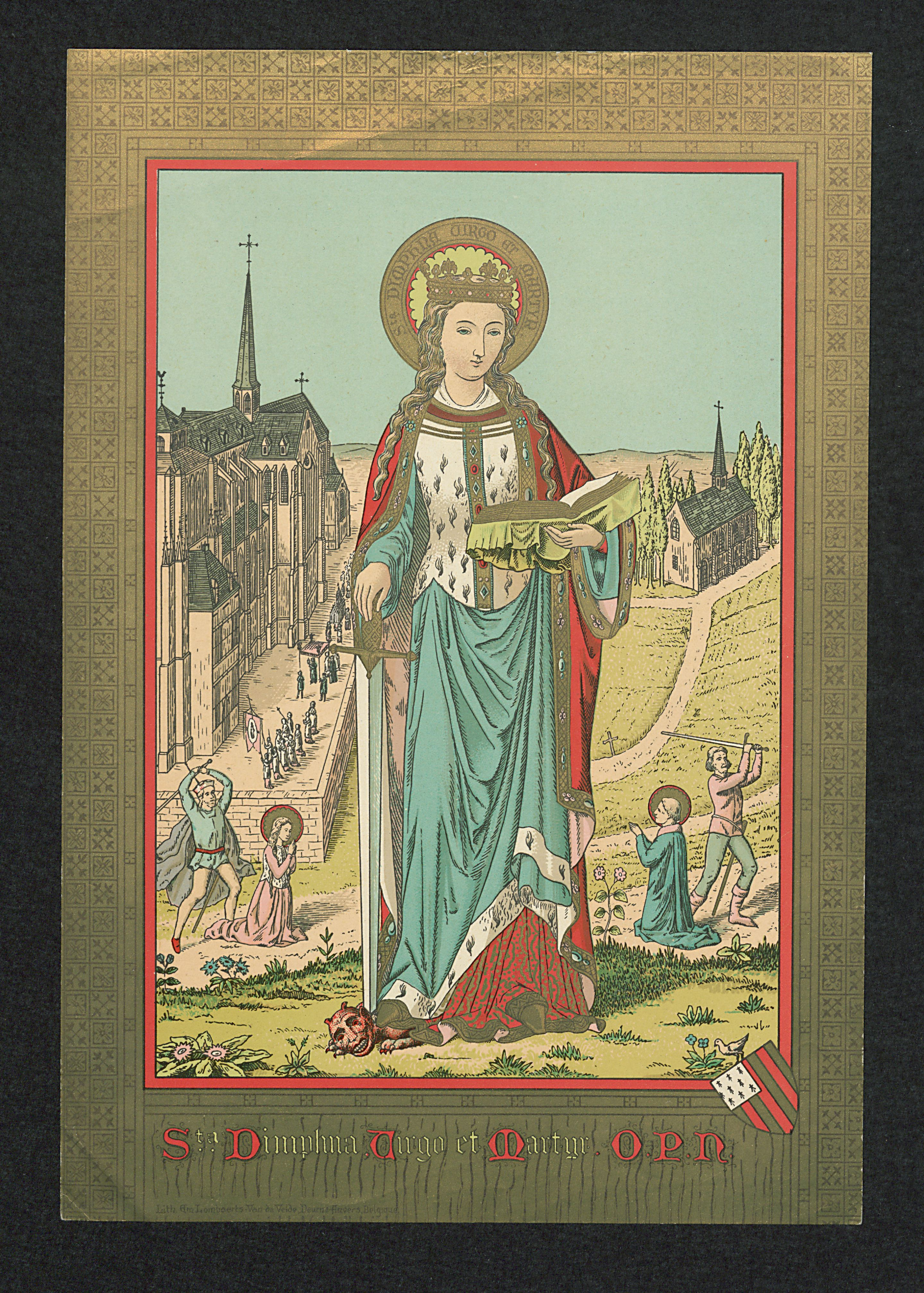
Virgin-martyr Dymphna of Geel, Flanders.

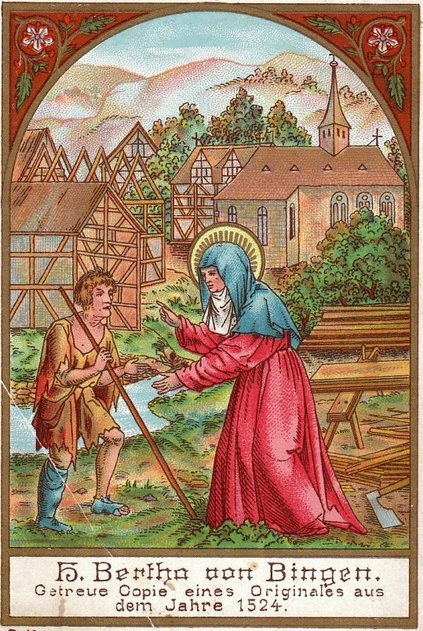
St. Bertha of Bingen.

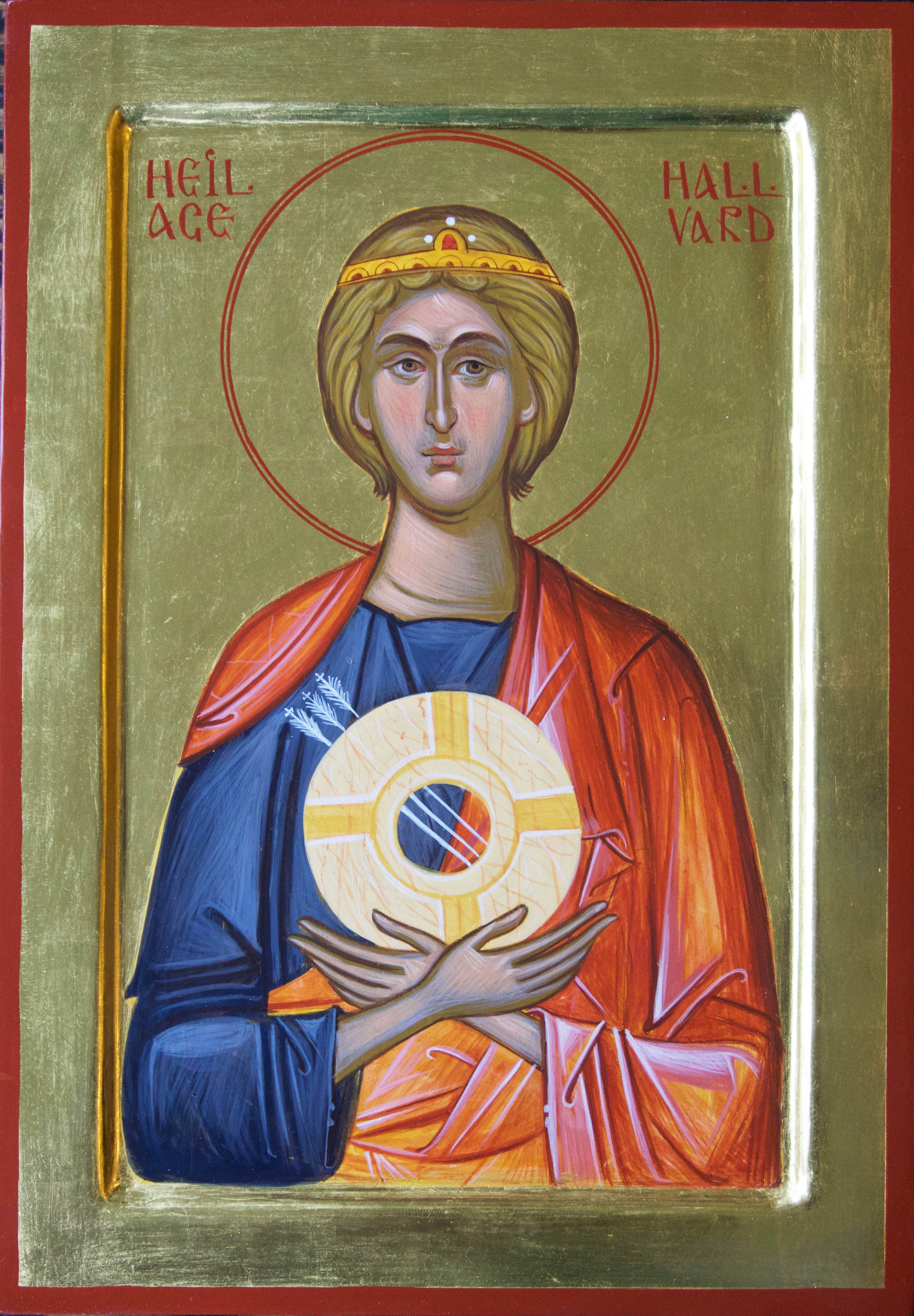
Saint Hallvard Vebjørnsson of Husaby, Norway.

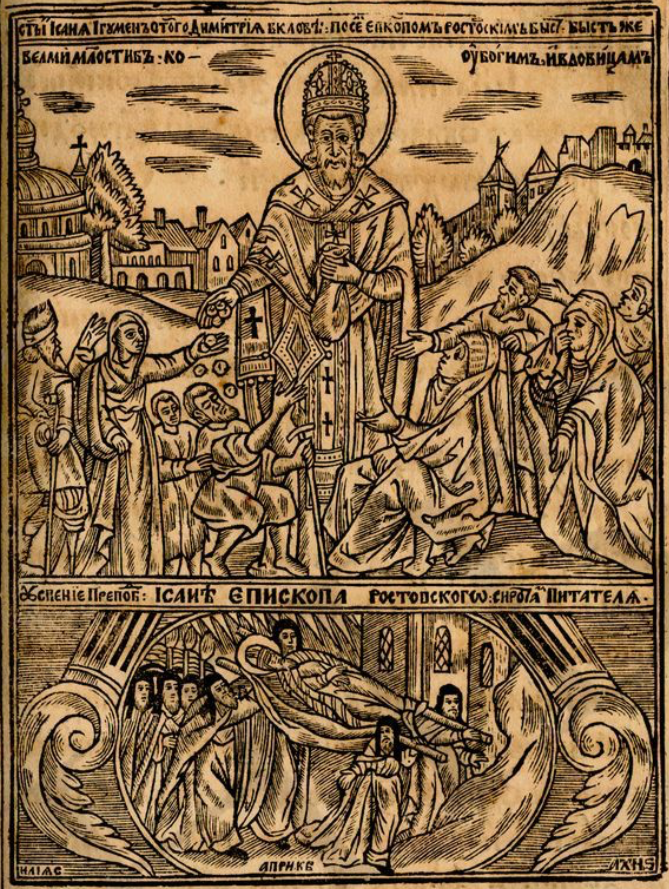
St. Isaiah of Rostov.

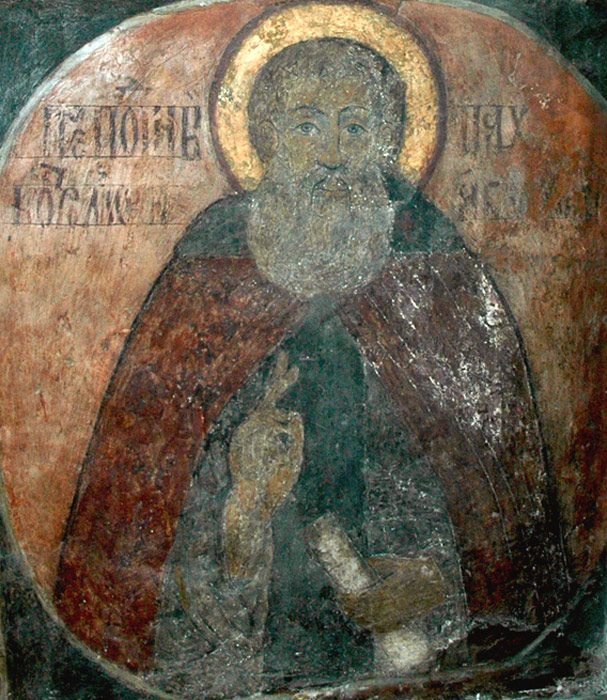
St. Pachomius of Nerekhta.

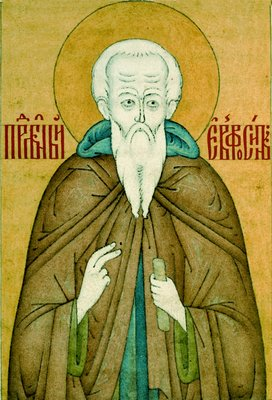
St. Euphrosynus of Pskov.

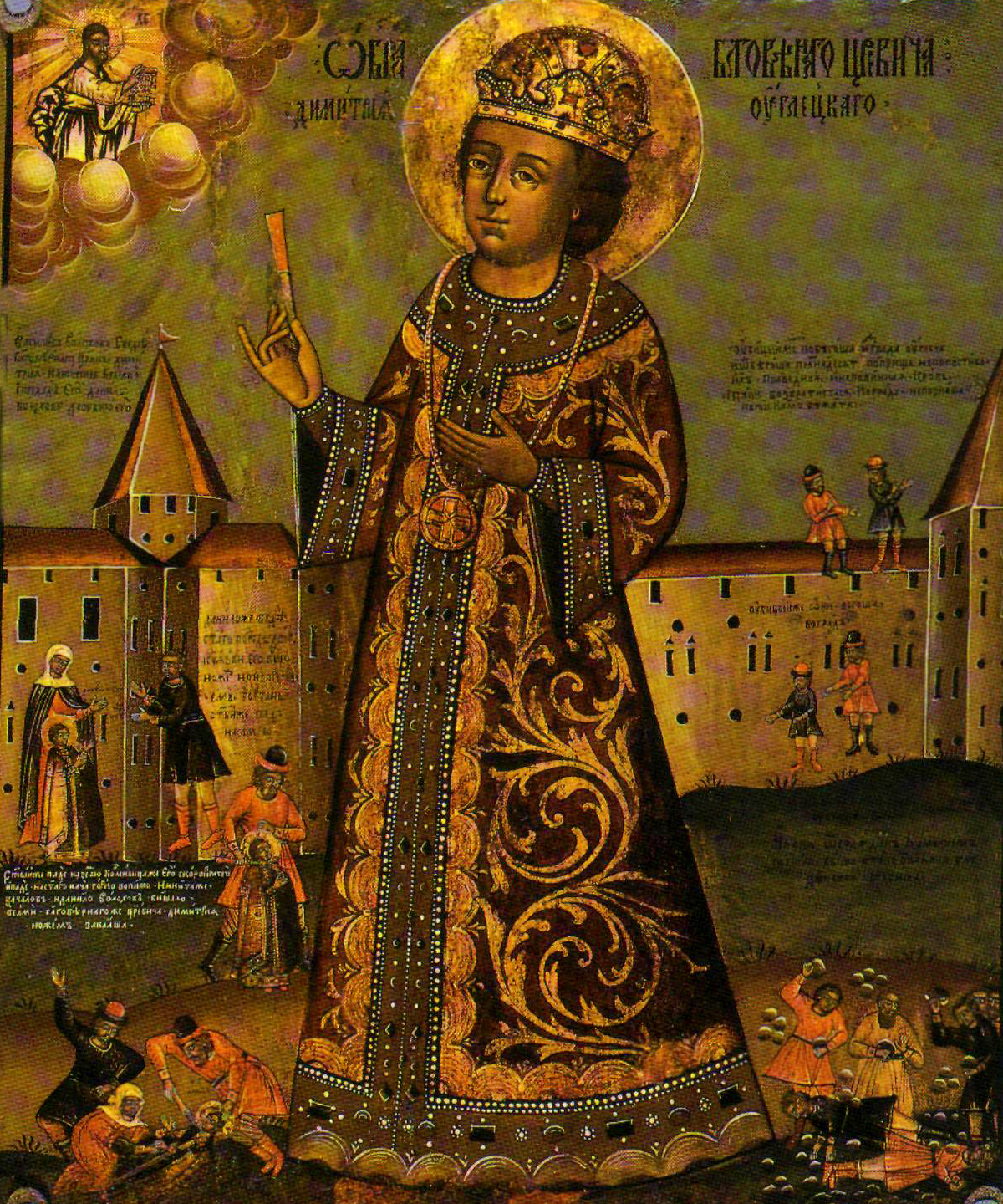
St. Dmitry of Uglich.

== Sources ==
- May 15/28. Orthodox Calendar (PRAVOSLAVIE.RU).
- May 28 / May 15. HOLY TRINITY RUSSIAN ORTHODOX CHURCH (A parish of the Patriarchate of Moscow).
- May 15. OCA - The Lives of the Saints.
- May 15. Latin Saints of the Orthodox Patriarchate of Rome.
- May 15. The Roman Martyrology.

Greek Sources

- Great Synaxaristes: (in Greek) 15 ΜΑΪΟΥ . ΜΕΓΑΣ ΣΥΝΑΞΑΡΙΣΤΗΣ.
- (in Greek) Συναξαριστής. 15 Μαΐου. ECCLESIA.GR. (H ΕΚΚΛΗΣΙΑ ΤΗΣ ΕΛΛΑΔΟΣ).

Russian Sources

- (in Russian) 28 мая (15 мая). Православная Энциклопедия под редакцией Патриарха Московского и всея Руси Кирилла (электронная версия). (Orthodox Encyclopedia - Pravenc.ru).
- (in Russian) 15 мая (ст.ст.) 28 мая 2013 (нов. ст.). Русская Православная Церковь Отдел внешних церковных связей. (DECR).
