= May 14 (Eastern Orthodox liturgics) =

Day in the Eastern Orthodox liturgical calendar

Eastern Orthodox liturgical calendar
May 13	May 14	May 15
May 14 O.S. ≍ May 27 N.S. May 14 N.S ≍ May 1 O.S.

An Eastern Orthodox cross

May 14 in Eastern Orthodox liturgical calendars is a feast day and a day of commemoration of saints and martyrs. Although some Orthodox churches use the Revised Julian Calendar and others use the traditional Julian calendar, the fixed commemorations for their respective May 14 are broadly the same, no matter which calendar is used. (Note: Despite the dates being the same, the days to which they refer typically differ by 13 days. The notation Old Style or O.S. is sometimes used to indicate a date in the traditional Julian Calendar (the "Old Calendar"). The notation New Style or N.S. indicates a date in the Revised Julian calendar (the "New Calendar").)

== Saints ==
- Martyr Maximus of Rome, under Decius (250)
- Martyr Isidore of Chios (251)
- Saints Alexander, Barbaras, and Acolythus (Acolouthus), martyred at the Church of St Irene (Holy Peace), near the sea in Constantinople.
- Martyrs Aristotle and Leandros.
- Saint Boniface of Tarsus, martyr (307)
- Venerable Serapion the Sindonite, monk of Egypt (5th century) (Note: Not to be confused with the 4th-century Saint Serapion, Bishop of Thmuis, in Egypt, Confessor (4th century), which is commemorated on March 21.) (Note: See: (in Russian) Серапион Синдонит. Википедии. (Russian Wikipedia).)
- Hieromartyr Therapontus, Bishop of Cyprus (632) (Note: "Despite this tradition, followed by certain synaxaria, he should perhaps be identified with his namesake, a priest of Sardis, commemorated on 27 May. According to a local tradition, Saint Therapontus was of western origin (cf. the 'Alaman' saints on 28 Sept., p.224). He shone by his miracles and his defence of Orthodoxy, and was killed by the Arabs in 632. The translation of his relics took place in about 690.") (Note: Not to be confused with Therapont of Sardis (+259); or Therapont of White Lake (+1426).)

== Pre-Schism Western saints ==
- Martyrs Justa, Justina and Henedina, in Sardinia (c. 130)
- Saint Pontius of Cimiez (Pons de Cimiez), martyred in Cimella (Cimiez) near Nice, whose relics gave his name to the town of Saint-Pons. (c. 258) (Note: Not to be confused with Pontius of Carthage (c. 260), who is commemorated on March 8.)
- Saint Aprunculus (Apruncule), first bishop of Langres, later of Clermont, Gaul (c. 488)
- Saint Boniface, Bishop of Ferentino in Tuscany (6th century)
- Saint Carthage (Carthach Mochuda) the Younger, founder and first abbot of Lismore (637)
- Saint Erembert, Bishop of Toulouse (657)
- Saint Tuto (Totto), monk and Abbot of St Emmeram in Regensburg in Germany, where he later became bishop (930)
- Saint Hallvard, of the royal family of Norway, patron saint of Oslo, martyr (1043) (see also: May 15)

== Post-Schism Orthodox saints ==
- Saint Nicetas, Bishop of Novgorod and recluse of the Kiev Caves (1108) (Note: See also: January 31, the day of his repose; and April 30, the day of the Uncovering of his Relics (1558).)
- Saint Leontius II of Jerusalem, Patriarch of Jerusalem (1190)
- Saint Isidore of Rostov, Fool-for-Christ and Wonderworker (1474) (Note: See: (in Russian) Исидор Ростовский. Википедии. (Russian Wikipedia).)
- New Martyr Mark of Crete, at Smyrna (1643)
- New Martyr John of Bulgaria (Raiko-John of Shumena), the goldsmith (1802)
- Saint Andrew, Abbot of the Holy Trinity–St. Raphael Monastery, Tyumen (1820) (Note: See: (in Russian) Андрей Рафаиловский. Википедии. (Russian Wikipedia).)
- Synaxis of the Saints of Starobilsk, Luhansk Oblast (2014) (Note: The celebration of the Synaxis of the Saints of the Starobilsk Land, was established according to the report of Bishop Nikodim (Baranovsky) of Severodonetsk, with the blessing of the Holy Synod of the Ukrainian Orthodox Church on December 23, 2014.)

=== New martyrs and confessors ===
- New Hieromartyr Peter Rozhdestvin, Archpriest, of Lanino, Ryazan (1939)
- New Hiero-confessor Matthew, Hieromonk, of Yaransk (1927) (see also: May 16)

== Other commemorations ==
- Commemoration of the martyrdom by the Poles (1609), of:

- Abbot Anthony with 40 monks and 1,000 laymen of the St. Paisius of Uglich Monastery; and
- Abbot Daniel with 30 monks and 200 laymen of the St. Nicholas Monastery, Kostroma.

- Synaxis of the Yaroslavsk-Pechersk Icon of the Mother of God (1823) (Note: See: (in Russian) Ярославская-Печерская икона Божией Матери. Википедии. (Russian Wikipedia).)
- First uncovering of the relics (1846) of Saint Tikhon, Bishop of Voronezh, Wonderworker of Zadonsk (1783) (Note: This is observed on May 15 in the Greek Synaxarion.)

== Icon gallery ==
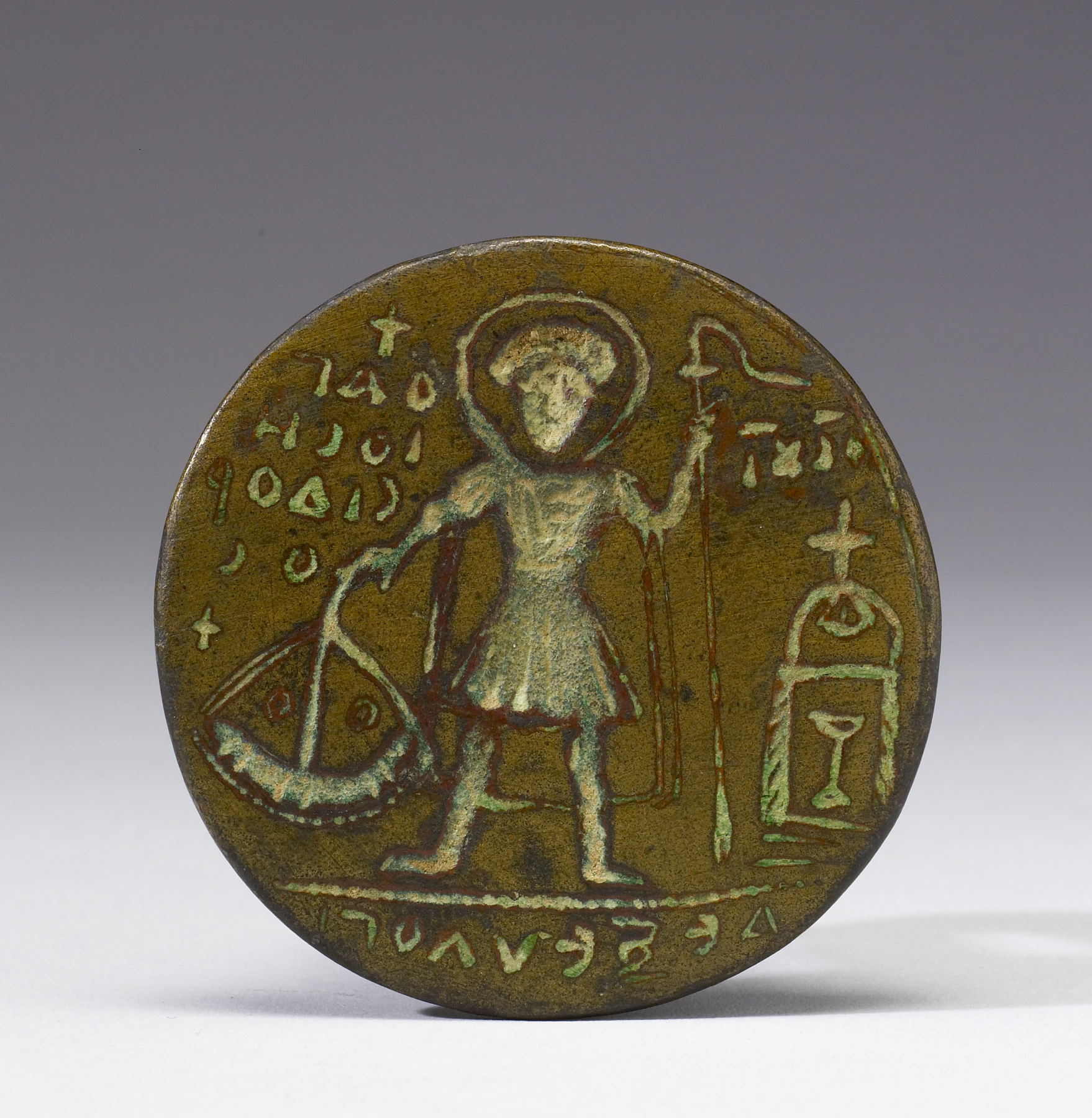
Byzantine Pilgrim Stamp of Saint Isidore (6th century).

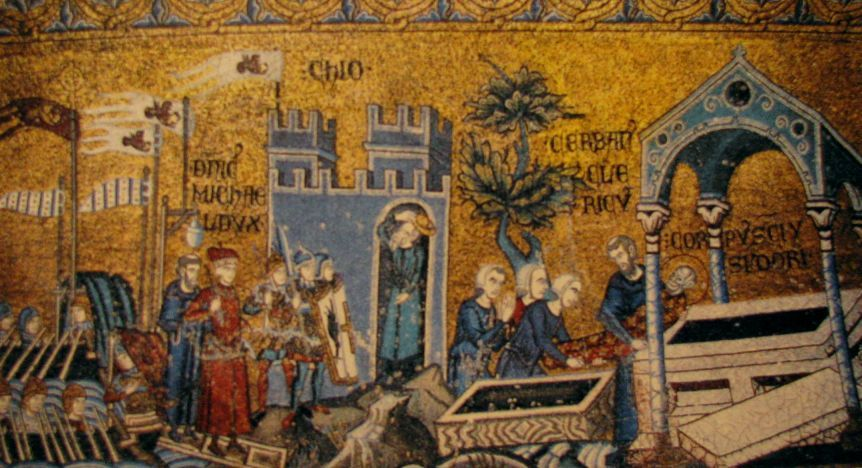
Translation of the relics of St. Isidore to Venice (Mosaic, St. Isidore chapel, in the Basilica of San Marco).

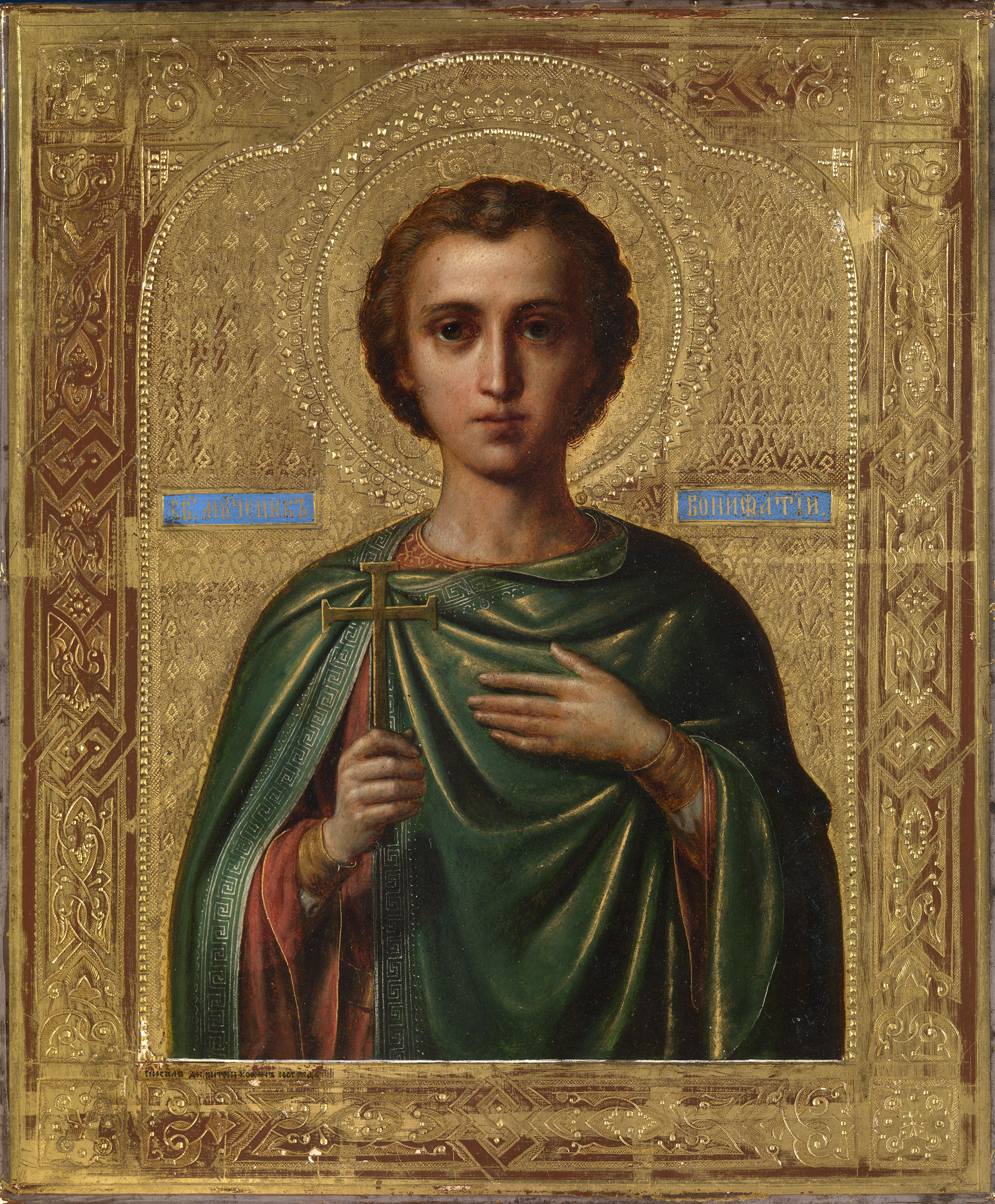
St. Boniface of Tarsus (Bonifatius).

St. Boniface of Tarsus (Bonifatius).
(Menologion of Basil II, 10th century).

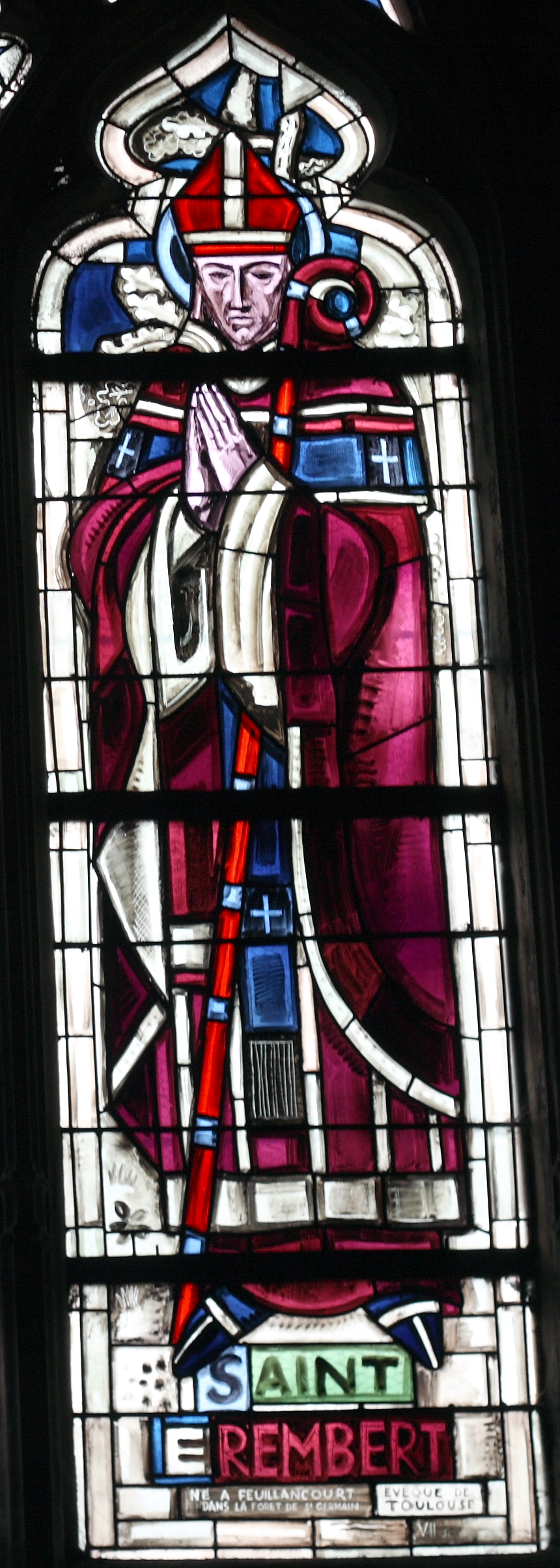
St. Erembert, Bishop of Toulouse.

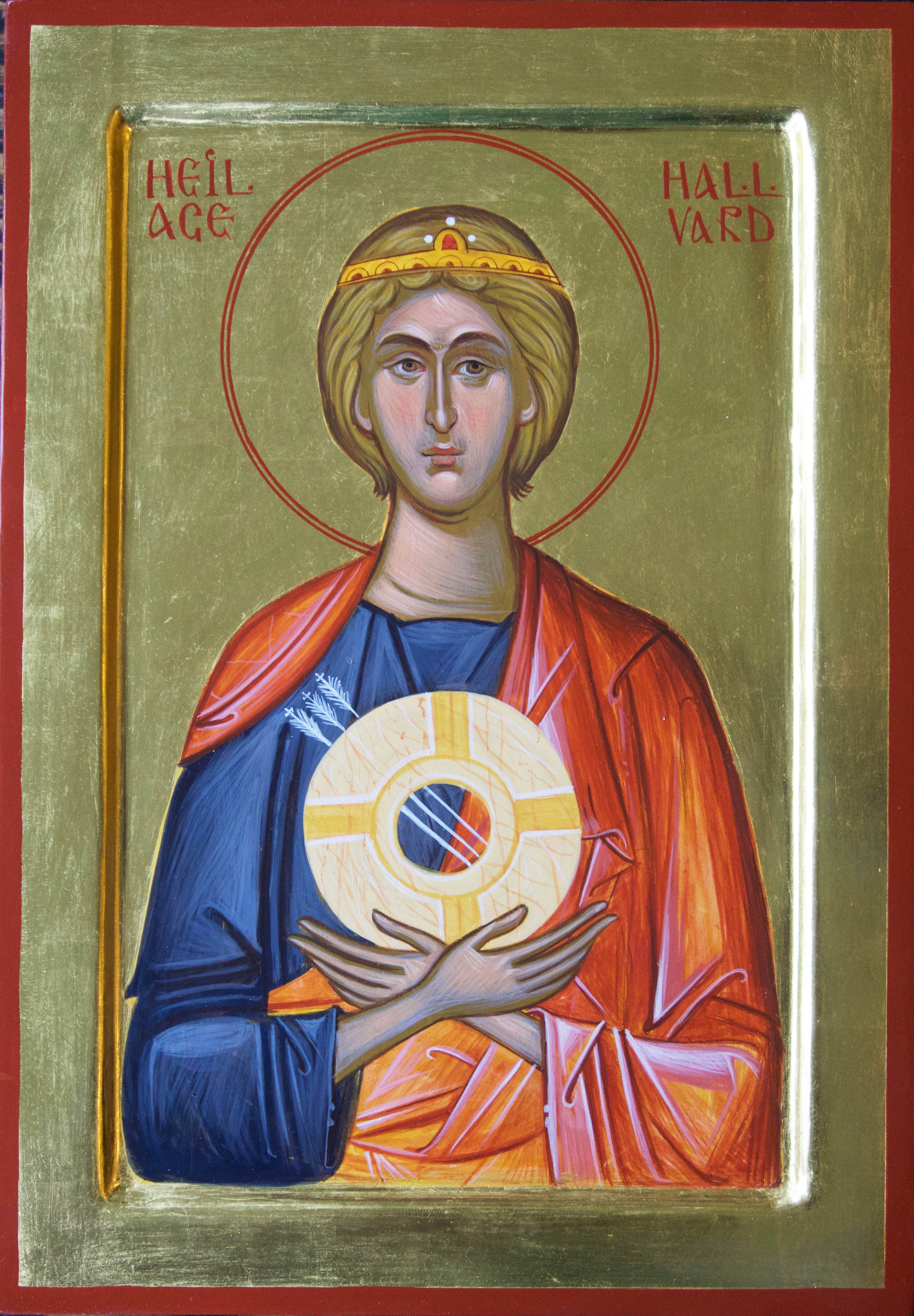
St. Hallvard, patron saint of Oslo.

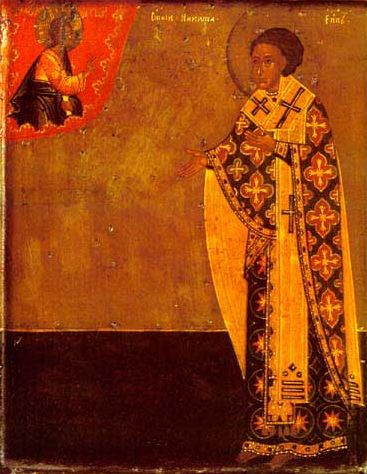
St. Nicetas, Bishop of Novgorod.

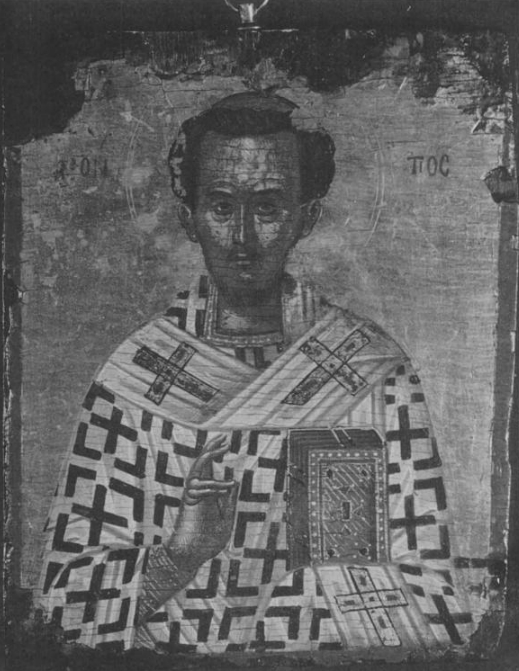
St. Leontius II of Jerusalem, Patriarch of Jerusalem.

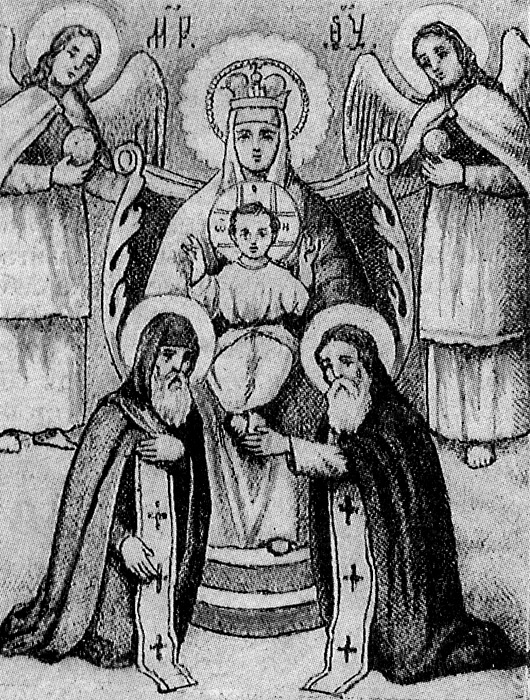
Yaroslavsk-Pechersk Icon of the Mother of God.

== Sources ==
- May 14/27. Orthodox Calendar (PRAVOSLAVIE.RU).
- May 27 / May 14. HOLY TRINITY RUSSIAN ORTHODOX CHURCH (A parish of the Patriarchate of Moscow).
- May 14. OCA - The Lives of the Saints.
- May 14. Latin Saints of the Orthodox Patriarchate of Rome.
- May 14. The Roman Martyrology.

Greek Sources

- Great Synaxaristes: (in Greek) 14 ΜΑΪΟΥ. ΜΕΓΑΣ ΣΥΝΑΞΑΡΙΣΤΗΣ.
- (in Greek) Συναξαριστής. 14 Μαΐου. ECCLESIA.GR. (H ΕΚΚΛΗΣΙΑ ΤΗΣ ΕΛΛΑΔΟΣ).

Russian Sources

- (in Russian) 27 мая (14 мая). Православная Энциклопедия под редакцией Патриарха Московского и всея Руси Кирилла (электронная версия). (Orthodox Encyclopedia - Pravenc.ru).
- (in Russian) 14 мая (ст.ст.) 27 мая 2013 (нов. ст.). Русская Православная Церковь Отдел внешних церковных связей. (DECR).
