= Saint Nicholas Princely Church =

Heritage site in Iași County, Romania

Coordinates: 47°09′32″N 27°35′14″E

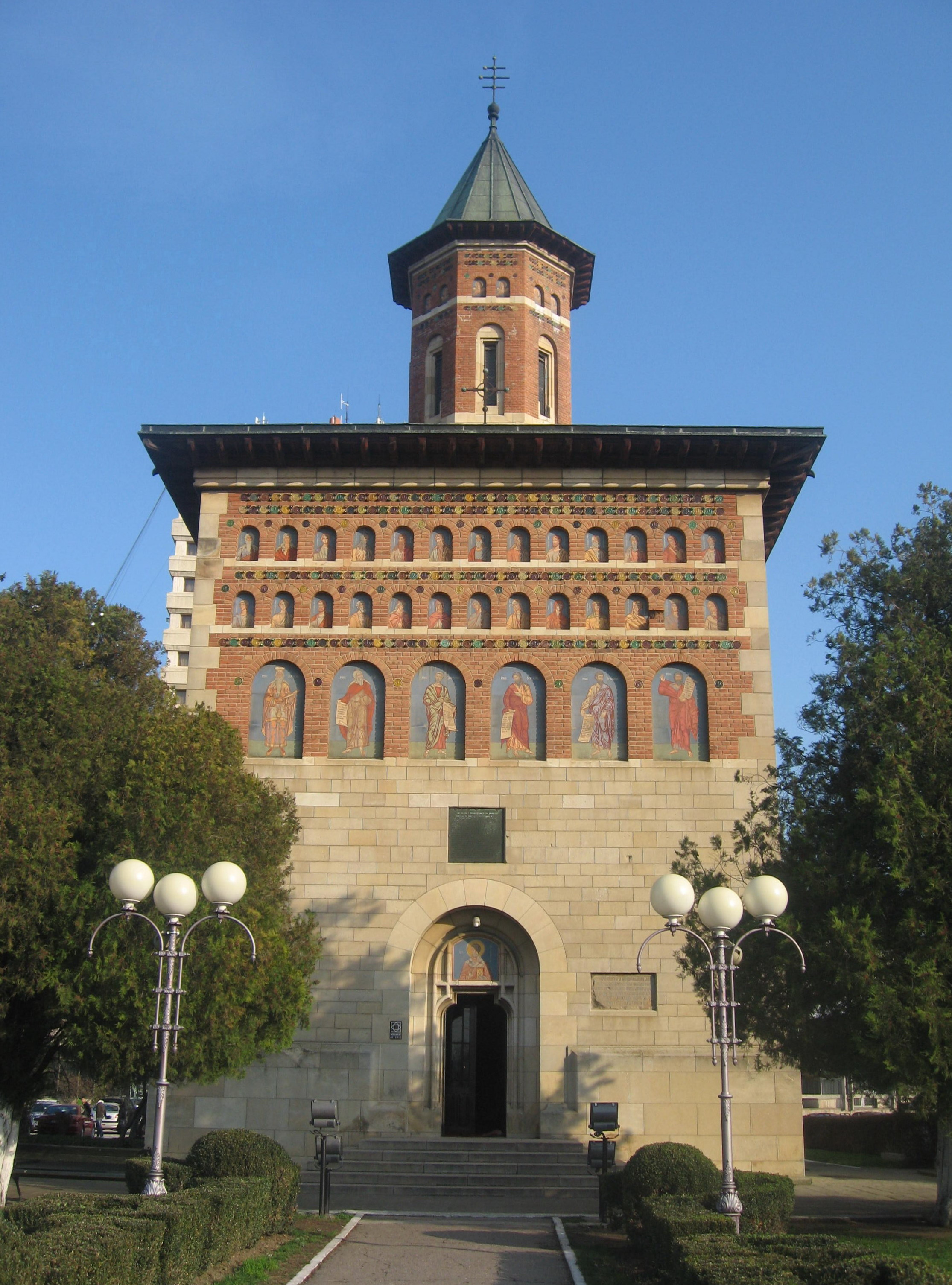
Saint Nicholas Princely Church

Saint Nicholas Princely Church (Romanian: Biserica Sfântul Nicolae Domnesc) is a Romanian Orthodox church located at 65 Anastasie Panu Street in Iași, Romania. It is dedicated to Saint Nicholas.

== Origins ==
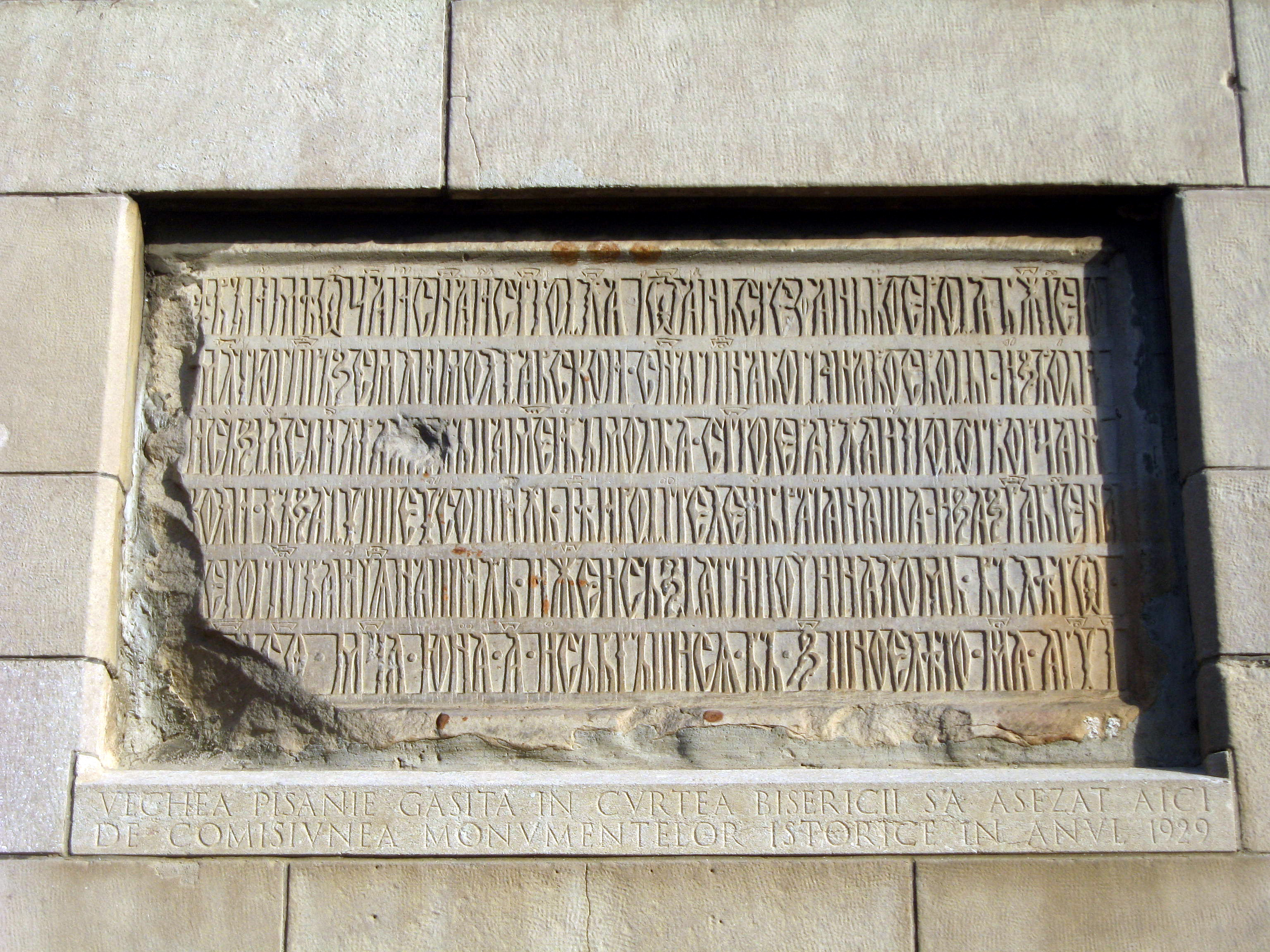
Dedication from Stephen's time

According to chronicler Grigore Ureche, the church was established by Stephen the Great after the Battle of Cătlăbuga in 1485. While he named the right ktitor, the date is incorrect, and was fixed by Axinte Uricariul, who observed that 1491 is inscribed on the dedication above the entrance. The date of completion is also written there and has largely been read as 1492, including by Nicolae Iorga. Another opinion sides with the earlier reading by Melchisedec Ștefănescu, suggesting a date of 1493. The building is one of Stephen's city churches: large, tall, with a spire, side apses and an enlarged vestibule. The facade was of unworked stone, with buttresses that reached two-thirds of the walls' height. The exterior was decorated with two rows of recesses, as well as rows of enameled, colored terra-cotta discs representing people and animals. The apses were endowed with large arches. The church was in a trefoil plan, with semicircular apses on the exterior as well as the interior. The walls of the interior were painted and there was a single spire, with an angular roof. A wall separated the nave from the vestibule.

In 1593, Trifon Korobeynikov, while passing through the city, noted the church's "height and grandeur". His description reveals that it had already been modified since Stephen's time: there was a stone bell tower above the entrance. Given the Russian traveler's mention, it is also likely that the church was painted on the exterior during the 16th century. Over the course of the following centuries, other modifications took place: the separating wall between nave and vestibule was replaced by two large stone pillars; and a large foyer was added, twice the size of the church, with a northern and a southern entrance. Two altars were set up in the area, probably during the 18th century, to Saints Barbara and Stephen. Other outbuildings were erected in the churchyard, bounded by a stone wall from the princely court.

== 17th-19th centuries ==
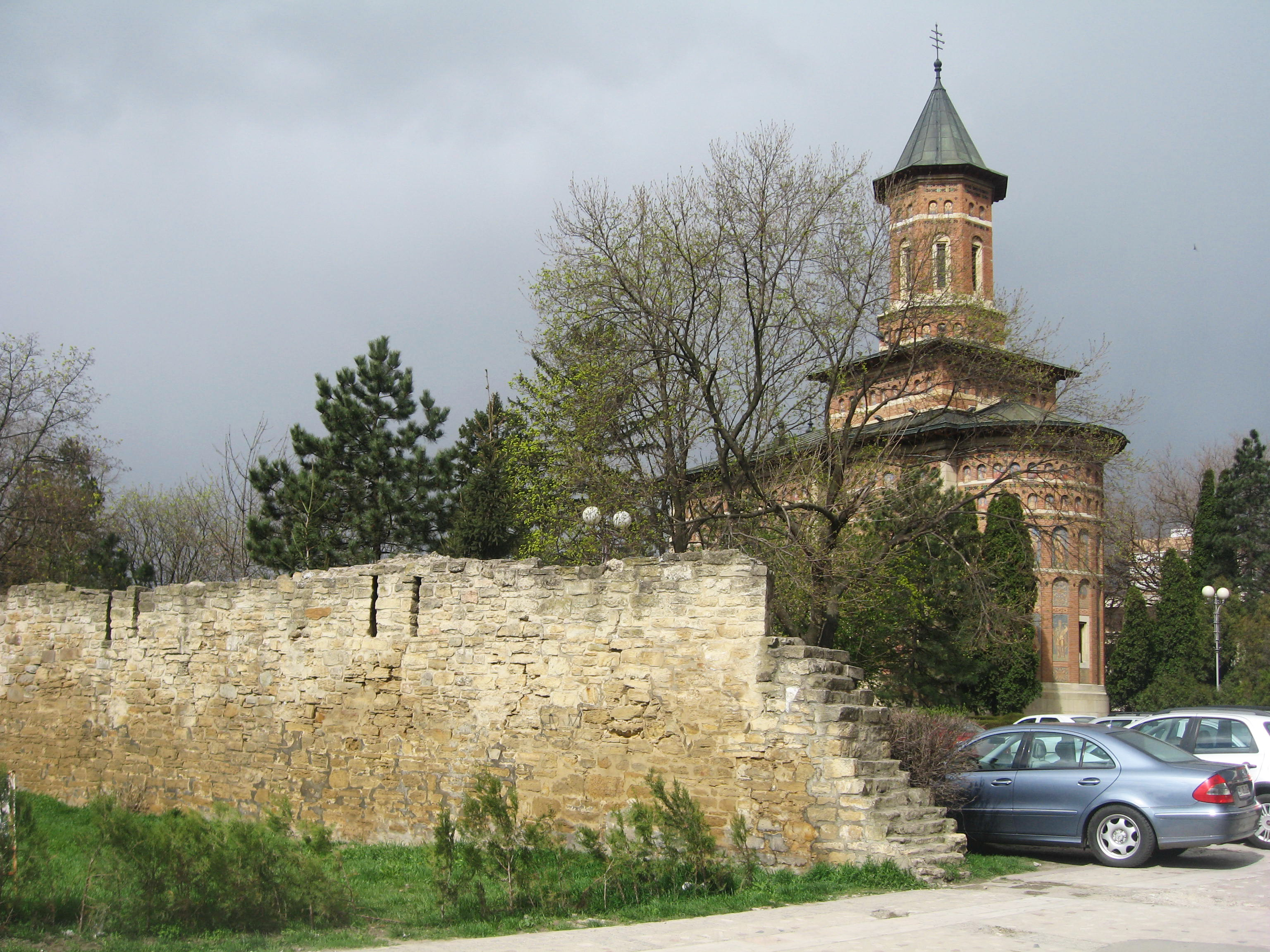
Wall remnants

Over time, the church suffered serious damage, so that in 1677, Prince Antonie Ruset ordered repairs and improvements; this is attested by chroniclers Nicolae Costin, Ion Neculce, Alexandru Amiras and Nicolae Mustea. However, not all the work was completed, and it was only in 1680, under George Ducas, that the interior painting was finished. Many historians believe that Ruset added the large foyer, particularly as he prepared his own grave there. A minority believe it is older, likely from the time of Alexandru Lăpușneanu. As no documents mention the structure until 1786, another hypothesis suggests a date from the later part of the 18th century. This was the position taken by the historians' committee that opted for demolition in 1890. The church was hit by fire in 1725, 1753, 1784, 1822, 1827 and 1853, and by an earthquake in 1814, as well as being affected by normal wear and tear. In 1703–1705, it was repaired by Ana, the wife of Prince Mihai Racoviță; Prince Ioan Teodor Callimachi undertook repairs in 1758 and Scarlat Callimachi during his 1812-1819 reign.

A document of March 1677 indicates that Antonie Ruset had decided, together with Metropolitan Dosoftei, to turn the church into a second seat for the Moldavia Metropolis, alongside that in Suceava. So it remained until another metropolitan see was built in 1695. While the chronicles indicate Ruset prepared his grave here, he died poor in Constantinople, and Prince Constantin Cantemir was placed in his crypt for a time. Others were subsequently buried there, very likely members of the princely families; several graves were removed from the narthex during the 1884 restoration. The church was the scene of welcoming ceremonies for princes who entered Iași in order to take up the throne, and many of them were anointed there during a ceremony described by Dimitrie Cantemir. The great religious feasts of the year were also celebrated in the church for the benefit of the royal court. The final anointment was that of Grigore Alexandru Ghica, in October 1849.

The church is associated with the activity of Dosoftei, who ran a printing press there. One of the works he put out was a renowned Lives of the Saints from 1681 to 1686. However, after Dosoftei was taken to Poland, the printing press petered out and the next one was not set up until the time of Iacov Putneanul, in the middle of the following century. Moreover, it functioned in a different location, the courtyard of the current cathedral. The school from the Saint Nicholas Church, begun by Constantine Mavrocordatos and by Metropolitan Nechifor, was reorganized by Iacov, eventually becoming among Moldavia's most renowned. It lasted until the early 19th century as among the few institutions where Romanian was the language of instruction; pupils were taught writing, reading, grammar and liturgical music.

The church was endowed with books, vestments and furniture that gradually disappeared. For example, when John III Sobieski took Dosoftei with him to Poland in 1686, he brought all the church's precious objects and clothing. Donors would constantly replenish the collection, which was fairly complete according to an 1803 inventory. When it was restored, all the church's remaining objects were divided among the city's other churches. This is how two 18th-century bells, repaired in 1817, ended up first in the cathedral yard and then behind Trei Ierarhi Monastery.

It appears that when Sultan Mehmed IV spent a week in Iași in July 1672 while on the way to Poland, the church was used as a mosque and then remained closed until Ruset's renovation. Unusually, from the late 18th century, the church had three altars (some sources speak of two chapels), where the liturgy was officiated in three languages (Romanian, Greek and Slavonic). By the time the restoration was agreed upon, it had five dedications: Saints Nicholas, Barbara, Stephen, Mina and Catherine.

== Restoration ==
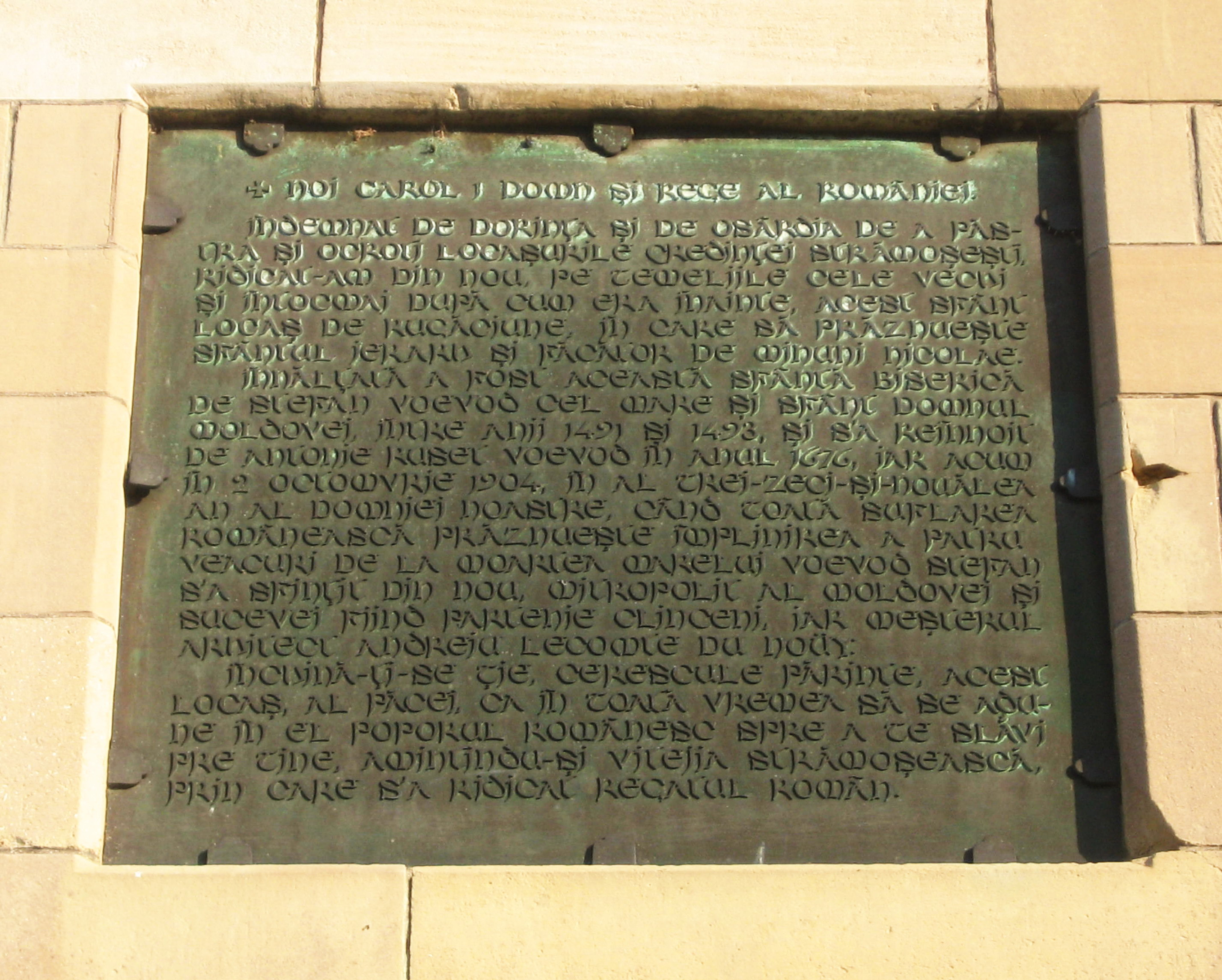
Carol-era dedication

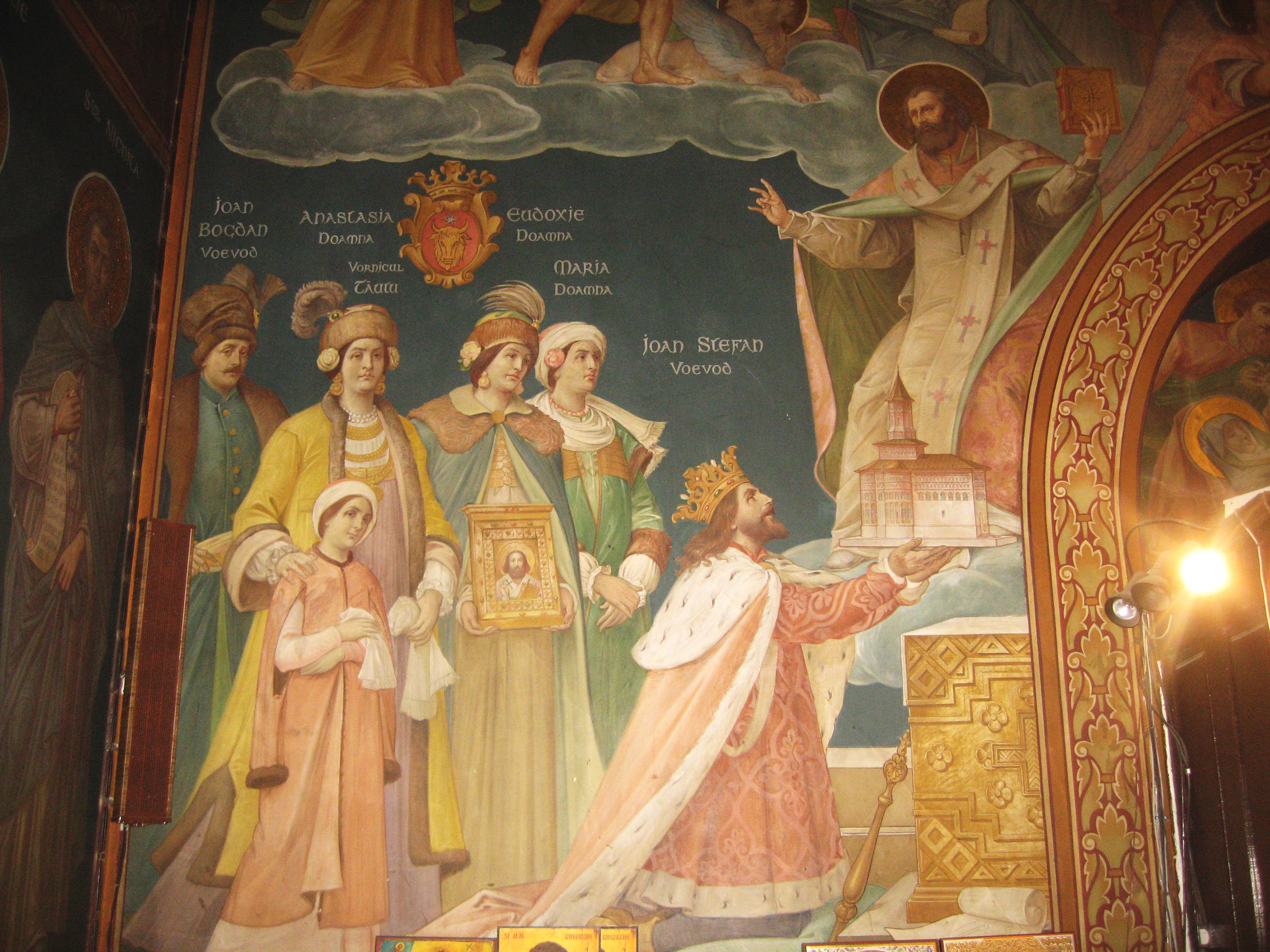
Portrait of Stephen

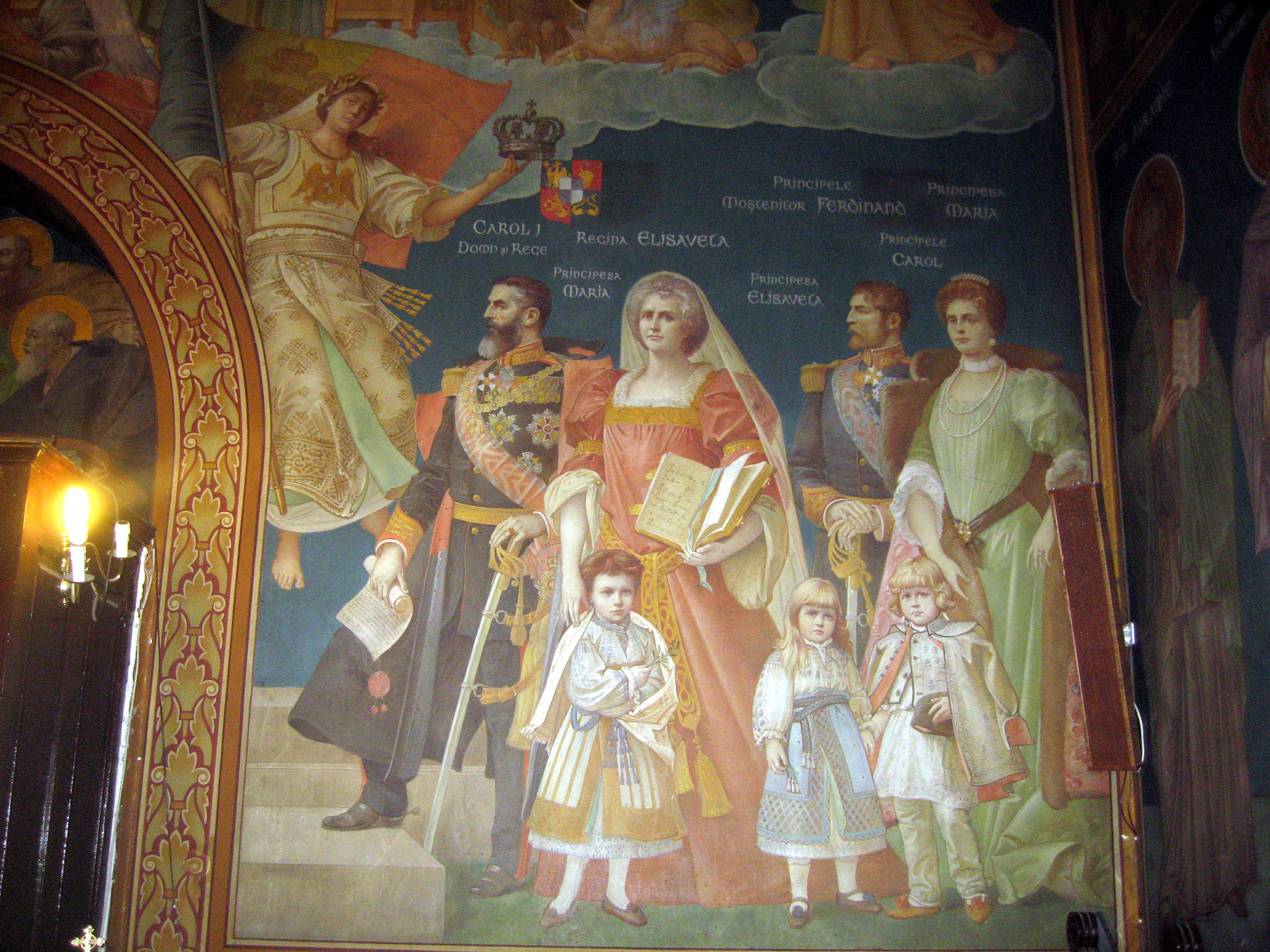
Carol and his family

After 1880, serious discussions about a restoration began. The building was in a very poor condition, particularly the added foyer, made of carved stone and irregularly-shaped boulders, the wooden ties of which had rotted. The limestone had oxidized and burst during fires, while the entire structure showed earthquake damage. The corners, particularly on the south face, showed enormous cracks. The French architect André Lecomte du Nouÿ was selected to lead the restoration work, assisted by Nicolae Gabrielescu. Operations began in 1884, when the 18th-century addition was demolished. Mihail Kogălniceanu and others asked that this instead be rehabilitated, but the committee on historic monuments ultimately decided that only Stephen's original church should be restored. Moreover, Lecomte du Nouÿ agreed with complete demolition due to the degraded condition of the masonry.

Reconstruction began in 1888, with a view toward a final form that expressed the artistic ideals of Stephen's era. From the annexes, only a nearby wall fragment surrounding the church was left standing. Lecomte du Nouÿ returned to the church's initial plan, placing the walls and the spire in one vertical sweep and eliminating the buttresses, thus giving the whole a much more sleek appearance. The exterior walls, above the stone base, were decorated with panels of visible brick and with traditional Moldavian elements such as rows of niches, discs of glazed and colored ceramic and large recesses.

The interior, including the iconostasis, furniture and painting, was completely redone. Fragments of 17th-century painting that depicted Ruset, Duca and their families were saved; for a time, they were kept in the Old Metropolitan Cathedral, then in the Gothic hall of Trei Ierarhi before probably ending up in a museum. The new painting was done by three French artists in a neo-Byzantine style that deviates from the previous iconographic layout. Notable are the idealized portrait of the first founder, Stephen and the second, King Carol I of Romania. The latter is shown with his queen, Elisabeth of Wied; Crown Prince Ferdinand and his wife Marie; and the three children the couple had at the time: Carol, Elisabeth and Mărioara. The symbolic significance of the paintings is underscored by the presence of traditional Romanian costume in the allegorical figures surrounding the king and in the children.

Although subject to criticism, the idealized reconstruction became a prototype for other monuments built or restored over the coming years. For example, Nicolae Ghica-Budești drew inspiration from the project. The church was blessed in October 1904, during national celebrations marking 400 years since Stephen's death. For the 1906 Bucharest jubilee, it was reproduced in its entirety as a symbol of Carol's achievements.

Today, the church functions as a chapel of Trei Ierarhi. It is listed as a historic monument by Romania's Ministry of Culture and Religious Affairs, as are the wall fragments.

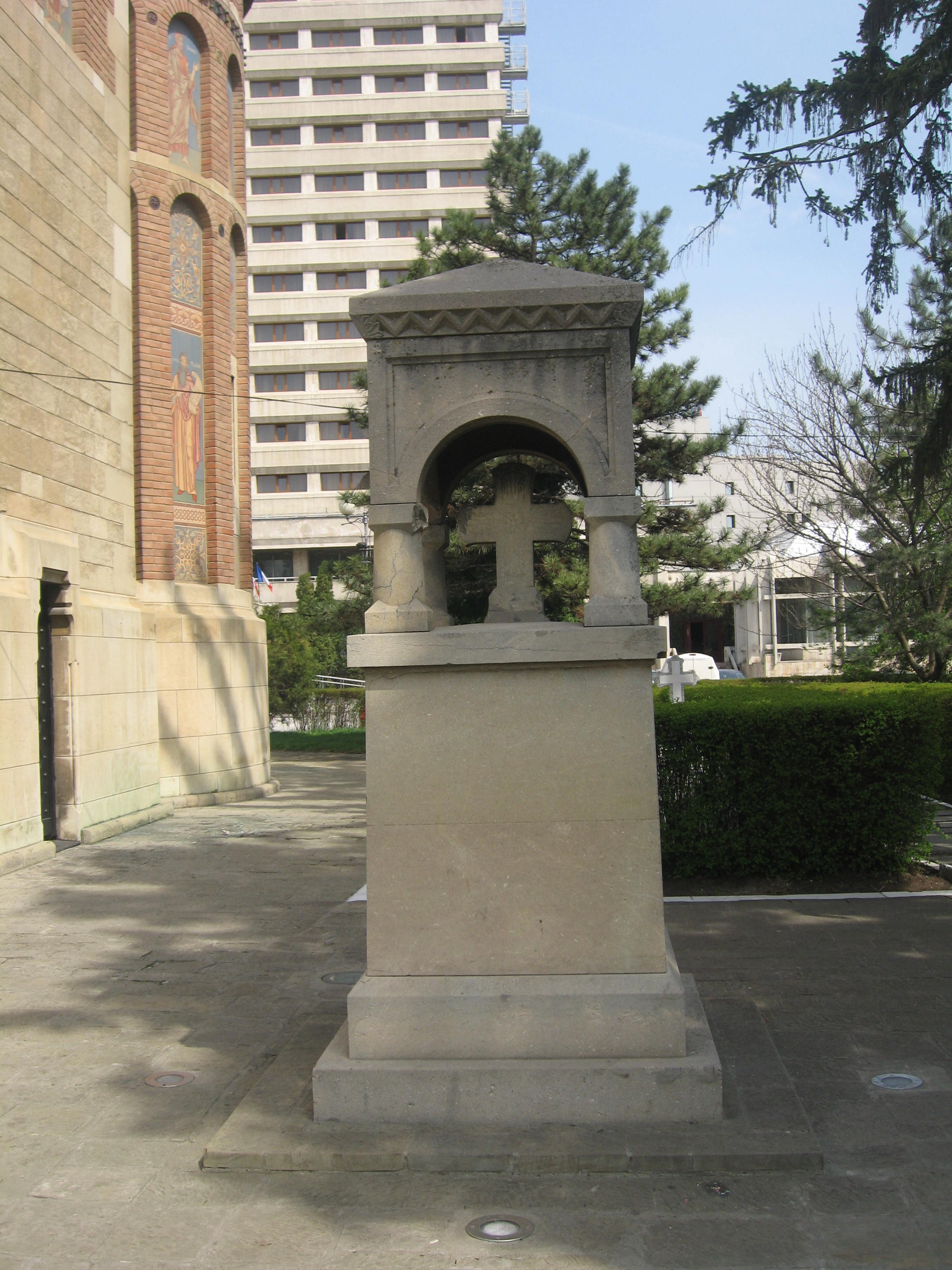
Cross on the former Saint Barbara altar

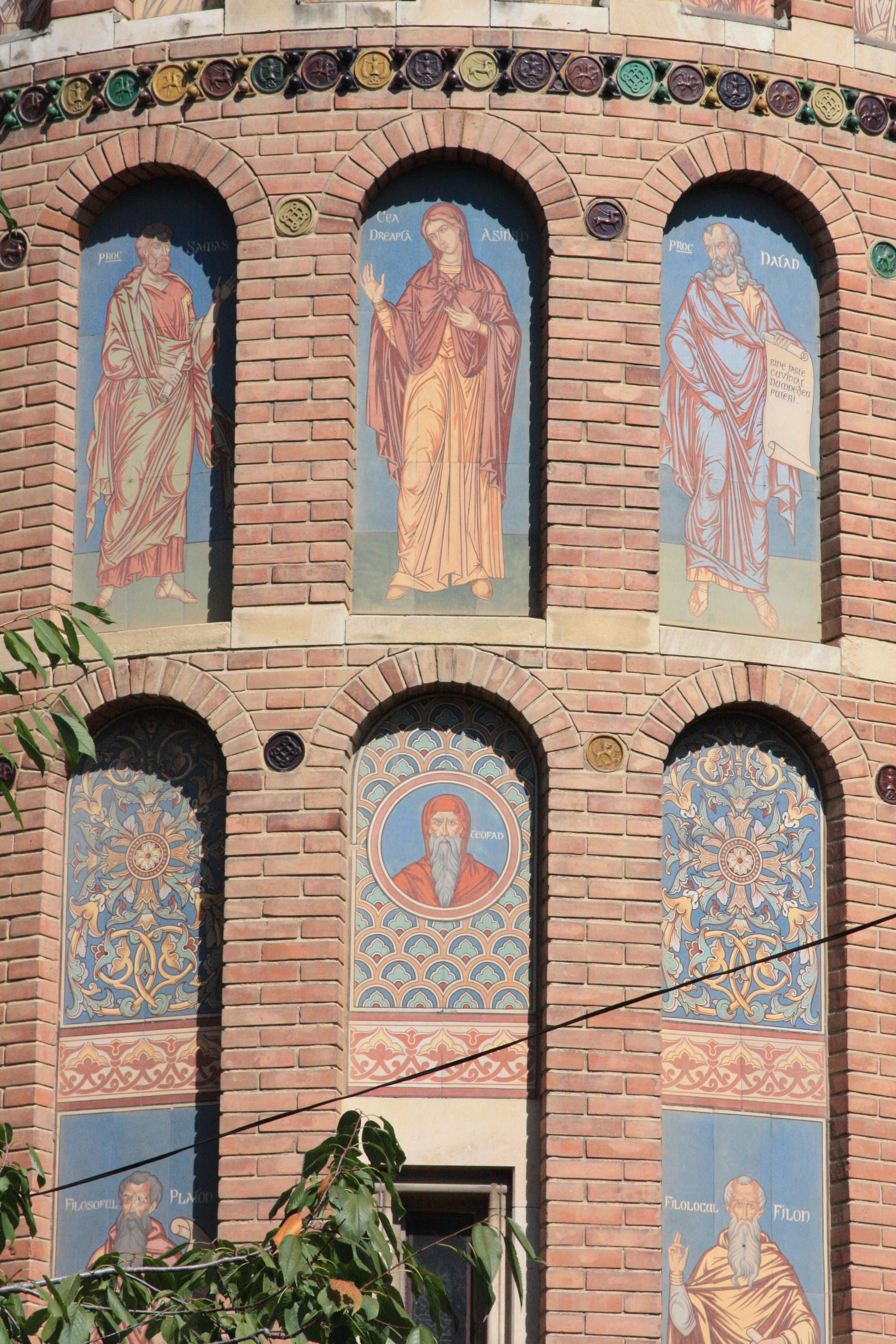
Exterior painting detail

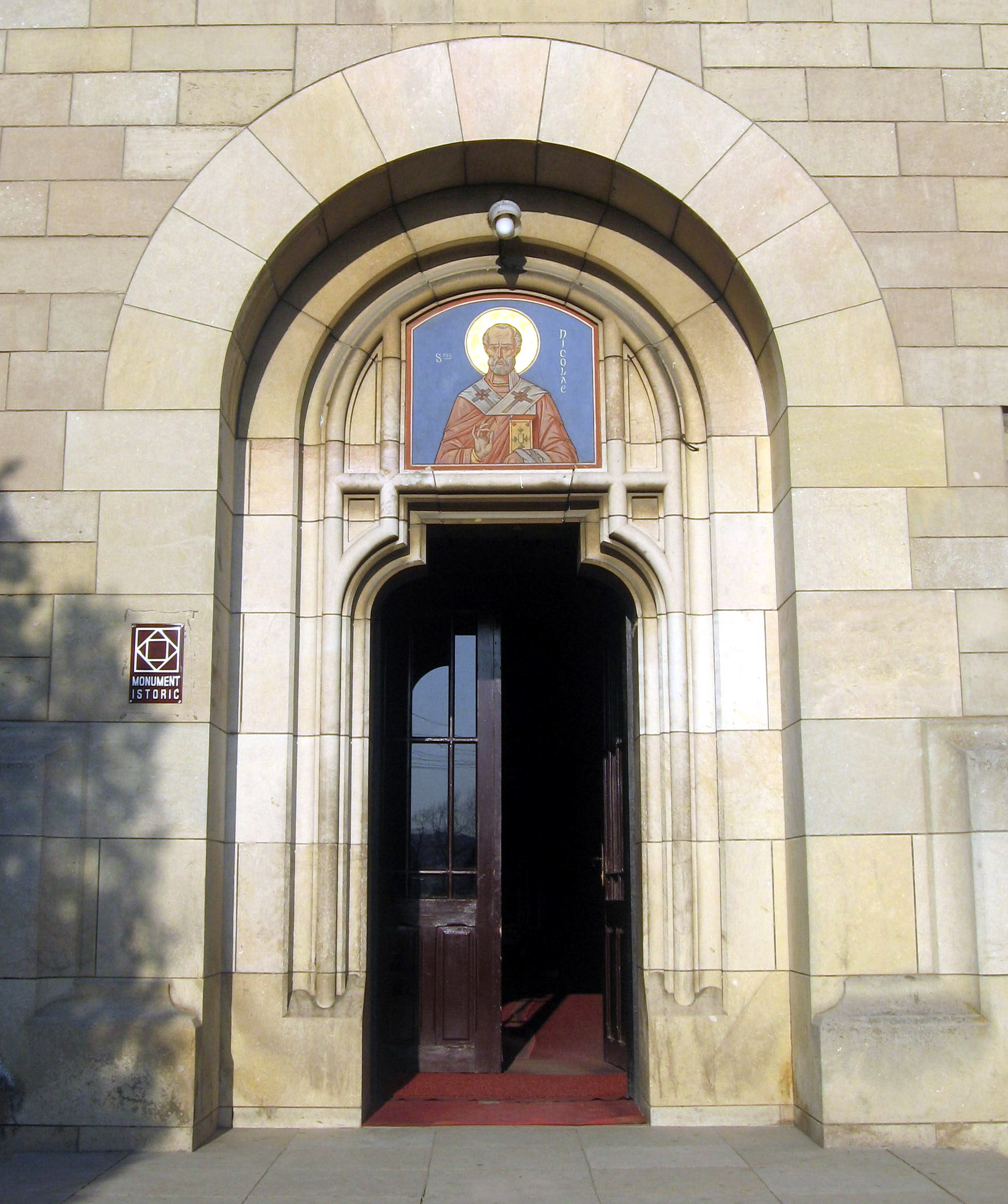
Entrance

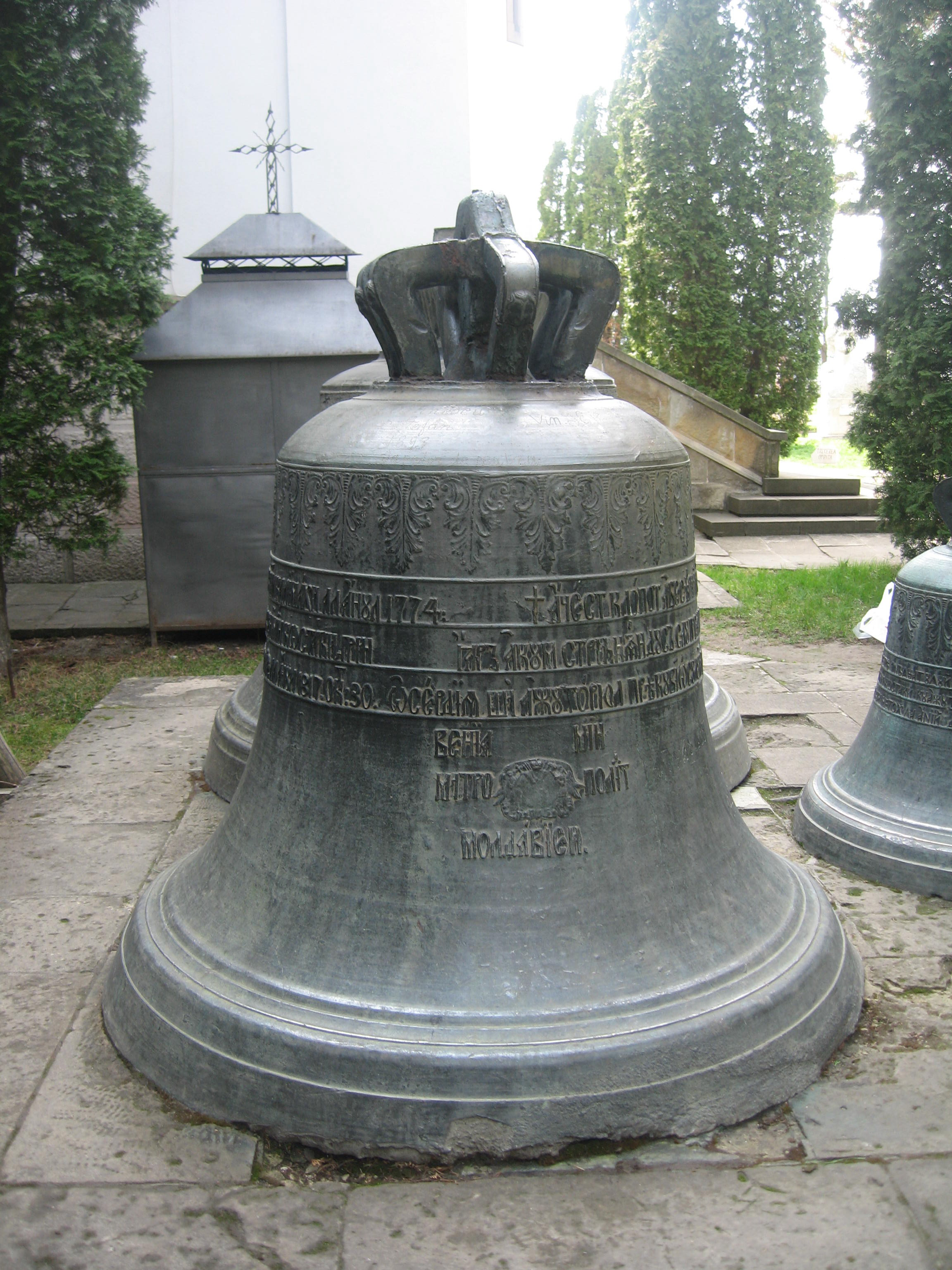
Large bell, kept at Trei Ierarhi
