= Euphrosynus of Pskov =

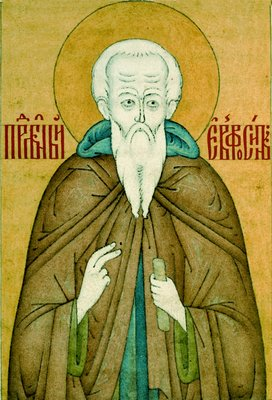
- Born: Eleazar c. 1386; Videlebe, a village near Pskov, Russia
- Died: May 15, 1481
- Honored in: Eastern Orthodox Church
- Feast: May 15

Euphrosynus of Pskov (Russian: Евфросин Псковский, romanized: Yefrosin Pskovsky; c. 1386 – May 15, 1481) was a Russian monk and the founder of a monastic community. He is venerated as a saint in the Eastern Orthodox Church and commemorated on May 15 (according to the Julian calendar).

== Life ==
Euphrosynus was born as Eleazar in Videlebe, a village near Pskov, Russia. He entered the Snetogorsky Monastery in Pskov, where he took the monastic name Euphrosynus. Around 1425, he began living in a hermitage, where he reported religious visions, and began attracting followers. Gradually, novices began to gather around him, the monastic community of the future began to take shape as Yelizarov Convent. In 1477, he built a church and instituted a monastic rule for the community, setting up his follower Ignatius as hegumenos.

He himself left the monastery to live in the forest near a lake.

He died in 1481 and was buried in his monastery.

He was canonized as a saint at the Makaryev Sobor of 1549.

== Sources ==
- "Евфросин, псковской чудотворец" . Brockhaus and Efron Encyclopedic Dictionary (in Russian). 1906.
- Michael Walsh (2007). "Euphrosynus of Pskov". A New Dictionary of Saints. Liturgical Press. p. 188. ISBN 978-0-8146-3186-7.
