= Isidore of Chios =

Egyptian Christian saint (died 251)

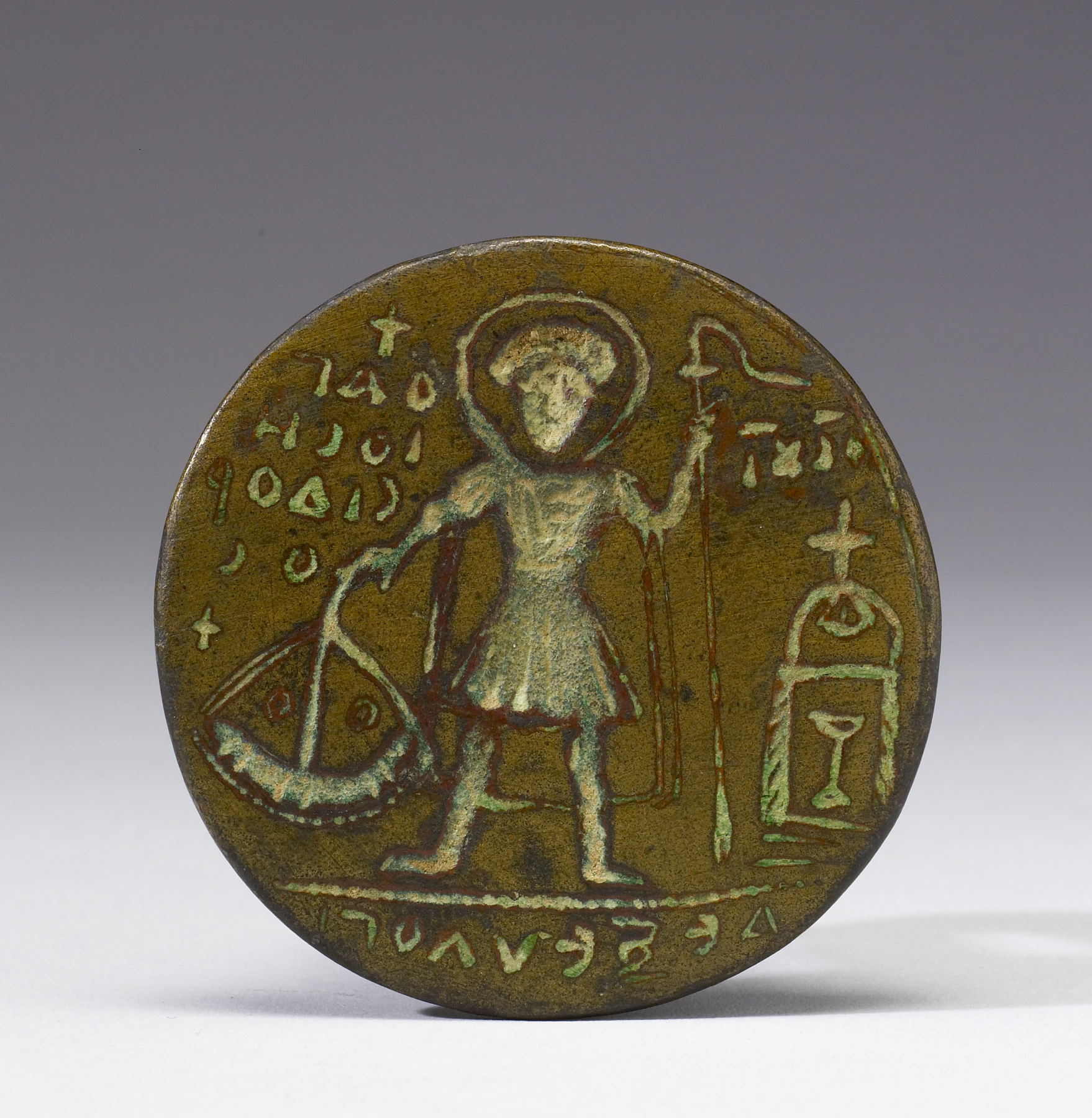
- Byzantine Pilgrim Stamp of Saint Isidore (6th Century)

martyr
- Born: Alexandria (?)
- Died: 251; Chios
- Feast: May 14
- Patronage: sailors, Mollerussa

Isidore of Chios was an Egyptian Christian soldier martyred on the island of Chios in 251 during the persecutions ordered by the Roman emperor Decius. His feast day is commemorated on May 14.

== Life and martyrdom ==
His life is the subject of several versions, mainly with hagiographic aims.

An Egyptian officer in the Roman navy, Isidore confessed himself as a Christian to the commander of the fleet while they were on the Aegean island of Chios. Because he was unwilling to repent and worship the gods of the state, he was tormented and beheaded, and his body cast into a cistern. According to one legend, at this point all the trees on the south side of the island shed tears for Isidore, and this was the origin of the mastic that is still collected regularly on the island.

According to tradition, his friends Ammonius and Myrope, both destined to martyrdom, would have retrieved the body and interred it properly. Later Myrope was buried beside Isidore, and on their grave miraculous recoveries were reported. There was built a chapel, and in the 5th century a church, thanking Saint Marcian. This church could be that of which a few ruins can now be admired in Chios town. St Isidore's veneration spread in all the Mediterranean sea and he became a sailors’ protector.

In 1125, his remains were brought from Chios to the Venetian Basilica of St. Mark, which contains a small chapel containing the sarchophogus.

== External links and sources ==
- http://www.stlukeorthodox.com/html/saints/may/14th.cfm
- https://web.archive.org/web/20040620135010/http://saintgeorge.org/news_and_events/church_calendar/saint_of_the_day/05may/may_14_saint_isidore_of_chios.php
