= Isaiah of Rostov =

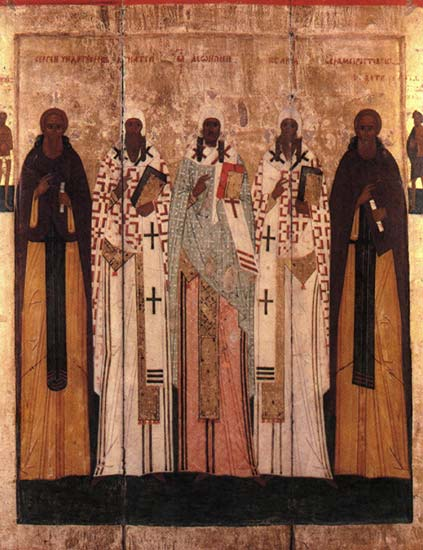
- Born: 1062; Kiev, Kievan Rus'
- Died: 1089/1090
- Known for: Russian Christian missionary and bishop

Isaiah of Rostov (fl. 1062 – died 1089 or 1090) was a Russian Christian missionary and bishop. His feast day in the Russian Orthodox Church is celebrated on May 15.

Isaiah was born near Kiev. He was tonsured at Kiev Pechersk Lavra, and became abbot of Saint Dmitry's Monastery. In 1077, he became the second bishop of Rostov, succeeding Leonty of Rostov. As Christianity was not yet well established in the area, he spent his tenure converting pagans, destroying idolatry and encouraging the spread of Christianity. The seat of Bishop of Rostov remained vacant for more than a century after Isaiah's death. Relics of Leonty and Isaiah were discovered in 1162 or 1164. In 1474 they were re-interred in a new cathedral of Rostov.

The first historical reference to Isaiah appears in the Life of Theodosius of Kiev (Russian: Житие Феодосия Печерского). According to the biographer of Theodosius, in 1062 prince Iziaslav I of Kiev selected Isaiah, a monk of Pechersk Lavra, to the newly instituted Demetrios Monastery, and in 1077 secured appointment of Isaiah as the Bishop of Rostov. Isaiah is mentioned in the Primary Chronicle twice: in 1088 Isaiah has consecrated St. Michael's church in Vydubitsy; in 1089 Isaiah and metropolitan John jointly consecrated the Church of Theotokos in Pechersk Lavra. Both these facts are reproduced in the Life of Isaiah of Rostov; these were actually all the facts available to the medieval biographer. He converted a routine mention of Isaiah' presence in Kiev in 1089 into a tale of magical instant flight from Rostov to Kiev and back. However, the year and circumstances of Isaiah' death remain unknown.

Life of Isaiah of Rostov exists in two versions; the second and larger version incorporates long quotes from earlier chronicles and scriptures but does not add anything to biography itself. 19th-century historians attributed the first, brief, version to 13th-century Rostov chronists. According to contemporary authors, it was actually compiled around 1474, the year of canonization.

== Sources ==
- "Исаия (епископ ростовский)". Русский биографический словарь. Т. 8: Ибак — Ключарев. Русский биографический словарь. 1897. p. 141.
