= Therapont =

Therapont, Therapontos (Θεράποντος, also Therapontus, Ferapont) is a Greek given name. "Therapontos" is genitive for therapon.

"Therapontos" also may be used as a surname.

"Ferapont" was a common Russian name of Russian Orthodox tradition, defined in the liturgical calendar as "worshipper, servant, caretaker, companion, etc."

The name may refer to:

- Therapont of Sardis (c. 259)
- Therapont of Cyprus (3rd century)
- Therapont of Belozersk (1331–1426), Russian Orthodox monk and saint
- Prodromos Therapontos, a footballer
