= Iacov Putneanul =

Iacov Putneanul (January 20, 1719–May 15, 1778) was a Romanian-speaking Orthodox cleric who served as Metropolitan of Moldavia.

Born in Rădăuți, his parents Adrian and Maria entered monasticism late in life and are buried in the portico of Putna Monastery church. Their son became a monk at Putna in 1731. He was ordained a hieromonk in 1736. He pursued study while at the monastery, where he served as hegumen from 1744 to 1745. He was bishop of Rădăuți from 1745 to 1750 and metropolitan of Moldavia from 1750 to 1760. At the height of his powers, he withdrew to Putna, which he wished to restore to its previous state of flourishing. Together with archimandrite Vartolomei Măzăreanu, he founded a spiritual school there in 1774. Instruction was carried out in Romanian, and the school was modeled on the Kyiv-Mohyla Academy.

Iacov was an Enlightenment scholar, translator, author of textbooks and developed Romanian-language printing in Moldavia: he assembled and printed a primer, the first in the Romanian lands. He wrote the first list of metropolitans of Moldavia, used in commemorating the dead. By printing a series of religious books (an Apostolos in 1756, a Psaltery in 1757 and a liturgy book in 1758), he secured the place of Romanian in the churches of Moldavia. He died at Putna. Canonized in 2016, his feast day is May 15.
