= List of municipalities of Spain =

Municipalities of Spain. 2004

This is a list of lists of the municipalities of Spain. The municipalities list links are listed below, by autonomous community and province.

In the present, there were a total of 8,132 municipalities in Spain, including the autonomous cities of Ceuta and Melilla*. Burgos is the province with the most municipalities (371) and Las Palmas the one with the least (34).

== List ==
Autonomous community/province	List	No. of municipalities
Andalusia	Municipalities in Andalusia	785
Almería province	Municipalities in Almería	103
Cádiz province	Municipalities in Cádiz	45
Córdoba province	Municipalities in Córdoba	77
Granada province	Municipalities in Granada	174
Huelva province	Municipalities in Huelva	80
Jaén province	Municipalities in Jaén	97
Málaga province	Municipalities in Málaga	103
Seville province	Municipalities in Seville	106
Aragon	Municipalities in Aragon	731
Huesca province	Municipalities in Huesca	202
Teruel province	Municipalities in Teruel	236
Zaragoza province	Municipalities in Zaragoza	293
Asturias*	Municipalities in the Principality of Asturias	78
Balearic Islands*	Municipalities in the Balearic Islands	67
Basque Country	Municipalities in the Basque Autonomous Community	252
Álava	Municipalities in Álava	51
Biscay	Municipalities in Biscay	113
Gipuzkoa	Municipalities in Gipuzkoa	88
Canary Islands	Municipalities in the Canary Islands	88
Las Palmas province	Municipalities in Las Palmas	34
Santa Cruz de Tenerife province	Municipalities in Santa Cruz de Tenerife	54
Cantabria*	Municipalities in Cantabria	102
Castile and León	Municipalities in Castile and León	2,248
Ávila province	Municipalities in Ávila	248
Burgos province	Municipalities in Burgos	371
León province	Municipalities in León	211
Palencia province	Municipalities in Palencia	191
Salamanca province	Municipalities in Salamanca	362
Segovia province	Municipalities in Segovia	209
Soria province	Municipalities in Soria	183
Valladolid province	Municipalities in Valladolid	225
Zamora province	Municipalities in Zamora	248
Castile–La Mancha	Municipalities in Castile–La Mancha	919
Albacete province	Municipalities in Albacete	87
Ciudad Real province	Municipalities in Ciudad Real	102
Cuenca province	Municipalities in Cuenca	238
Guadalajara province	Municipalities in Guadalajara	288
Toledo province	Municipalities in Toledo	204
Catalonia	Municipalities in Catalonia	947
Barcelona province	Municipalities in Barcelona	311
Girona province	Municipalities in Girona	221
Lleida province	Municipalities in Lleida	231
Tarragona province	Municipalities in Tarragona	184
Extremadura	Municipalities in Extremadura	388
Badajoz province	Municipalities in Badajoz	165
Cáceres province	Municipalities in Cáceres	223
Galicia	Municipalities in Galicia	313
A Coruña province	Municipalities in A Coruña	93
Lugo province	Municipalities in Lugo	67
Ourense province	Municipalities in Ourense	92
Pontevedra province	Municipalities in Pontevedra	61
Madrid*	Municipalities in Madrid	179
Murcia*	Municipalities in the Region of Murcia	45
Navarre*	Municipalities in the Chartered Community of Navarre	272
La Rioja*	Municipalities in La Rioja	174
Valencian Community	Municipalities in the Valencian Community	542
Alicante province	Municipalities in Alicante	141
Castellón province	Municipalities in Castellón	135
Valencia province	Municipalities in Valencia	266
Autonomous city	List	No. of municipalities
Ceuta	—	1
Melilla	—	1

Notes:
*Single-province autonomous communities.

== Ranked lists of Spanish municipalities ==
=== By surface area ===
The 100 largest municipalities by area.

#	Municipality	Province	Surface (km^{2})
1	Cáceres	Cáceres	1,750.23
2	Lorca	Murcia	1,675.2
3	Badajoz	Badajoz	1,440.37
4	Córdoba	Córdoba	1,254.25
5	Almodóvar del Campo	Ciudad Real	1,208.27
6	Jerez de la Frontera	Cádiz	1,187.92
7	Albacete	Albacete	1,126.99
8	Écija	Seville	978.47
9	Zaragoza	Zaragoza	973.78
10	Jumilla	Murcia	969
11	Andújar	Jaén	964.9
12	Moratalla	Murcia	954.82
13	Carmona	Seville	923.12
14	Cuenca	Cuenca	910.6
15	Hornachuelos	Córdoba	909.2
16	Murcia	Murcia	885.96
17	Mérida	Badajoz	865.19
18	Villarrobledo	Albacete	862.41
19	Caravaca de la Cruz	Murcia	859.51
20	Almonte	Huelva	859.21
21	Cangas del Narcea	Asturias	823.57
22	Requena	Valencia	814.21
23	Hellín	Albacete	781.19
24	Antequera	Málaga	749.34
25	Jerez de los Caballeros	Badajoz	739.79
26	Alburquerque	Badajoz	723.23
27	Santiago-Pontones	Jaén	682.83
28	Chinchilla de Monte-Aragón	Albacete	679.27
29	Los Yébenes	Toledo	677.46
30	Alcázar de San Juan	Ciudad Real	666.5
31	Retuerta del Bullaque	Ciudad Real	653.9
32	Utrera	Seville	651.27
33	Trujillo	Cáceres	649.53
34	Mula	Murcia	634.06
35	Ejea de los Caballeros	Zaragoza	609.92
36	Madrid	Madrid	605.77
37	Yecla	Murcia	605.64
38	Níjar	Almería	599.77
39	Alía	Cáceres	599.51
40	Valencia de Alcántara	Cáceres	594.83
41	Osuna	Seville	592.25
42	Fuente Obejuna	Córdoba	591.39
43	Sabiñánigo	Huesca	586.82
44	Montoro	Córdoba	586.12
45	Alhambra	Ciudad Real	580.09
46	Piedrabuena	Ciudad Real	565.36
47	Don Benito	Badajoz	561.69
48	Cartagena	Murcia	558.08
49	Alcántara	Cáceres	551.99
50	Baza	Granada	545.39
51	Tineo	Asturias	540.83
52	Viso del Marqués	Ciudad Real	533.2
53	Almansa	Albacete	531.91
54	Hinojosa del Duque	Córdoba	531.47
55	Arcos de la Frontera	Cádiz	526.81
56	Puebla de Don Fadrique	Granada	523.39
57	Cardeña	Córdoba	512.87
58	Yeste	Albacete	511.22
59	Caspe	Zaragoza	503.15
60	El Bonillo	Albacete	502.66
61	Aroche	Huelva	498.44
62	Azuaga	Badajoz	497.89
63	Valdepeñas	Ciudad Real	489.26
64	Medina Sidonia	Cádiz	487.23
65	Constantina	Seville	481.32
66	Alcalá de los Gazules	Cádiz	479.07
67	Cabeza del Buey	Badajoz	475.02
68	Manzanares	Ciudad Real	474.22
69	Huéscar	Granada	473.44
70	Alcañiz	Teruel	472.12
71	Villaviciosa de Córdoba	Córdoba	468.75
72	Albarracín	Teruel	452.7
73	Aznalcázar	Seville	449.62
74	Loja	Granada	447.53
75	Ayora	Valencia	446.58
76	Arcos de Jalón	Soria	441.54
77	Vélez-Blanco	Almería	441.31
78	Teruel	Teruel	440.41
79	A Fonsagrada	Lugo	438.42
80	Daimiel	Ciudad Real	438.06
81	Fraga	Huesca	437.64
82	Espiel	Córdoba	437.26
83	Nerpio	Albacete	435.78
84	Castuera	Badajoz	432.04
85	Morón de la Frontera	Seville	431.93
86	Olivenza	Badajoz	430.14
87	Villanueva de Córdoba	Córdoba	429.52
88	Cúllar	Granada	427.53
89	Puebla de Don Rodrigo	Ciudad Real	424.87
90	Jaén	Jaén	424.3
91	Abenójar	Ciudad Real	423.43
92	Alhama de Granada	Granada	419.8
93	Tarifa	Cádiz	419.77
94	Morella	Castellón	413.54
95	Calzada de Calatrava	Ciudad Real	410.82
96	San Esteban de Gormaz	Soria	406.71
97	Jaca	Huesca	406.34
98	Tauste	Zaragoza	405.23
99	Úbeda	Jaén	403.78
100	Torre de Juan Abad	Ciudad Real	399.19

=== By population ===
The 100 most populous in Spain as of 1 January 2019, from the revision of the padrón continuo provided by the INE.

#	Municipality	Province	Population (1 January 2019)
1	Madrid	Madrid	3,266,126
2	Barcelona	Barcelona	1,636,762
3	Valencia	Valencia	794,288
4	Seville	Seville	688,592
5	Zaragoza	Zaragoza	674,997
6	Málaga	Málaga	574,654
7	Murcia	Murcia	453,258
8	Palma	Balearic Islands	416,065
9	Las Palmas de Gran Canaria	Las Palmas	379,925
10	Bilbao	Biscay	346,843
11	Alicante	Alicante	334,887
12	Córdoba	Córdoba	325,701
13	Valladolid	Valladolid	298,412
14	Vigo	Pontevedra	295,364
15	Gijón	Asturias	271,780
16	L'Hospitalet de Llobregat	Barcelona	264,923
17	Vitoria-Gasteiz	Álava	251,774
18	A Coruña	A Coruña	245,711
19	Elche/Elx	Alicante	232,517
20	Granada	Granada	232,462
21	Terrassa	Barcelona	220,556
22	Badalona	Barcelona	220,440
23	Oviedo	Asturias	219,686
24	Cartagena	Murcia	214,802
25	Sabadell	Barcelona	213,644
26	Jerez de la Frontera	Cádiz	212,749
27	Móstoles	Madrid	209,184
28	Santa Cruz de Tenerife	Santa Cruz de Tenerife	207,312
29	Pamplona	Navarre	201,653
30	Almería	Almería	198,533
31	Alcalá de Henares	Madrid	195,649
32	Fuenlabrada	Madrid	193,700
33	Leganés	Madrid	189,861
34	Donostia/San Sebastián	Gipuzkoa	187,415
35	Getafe	Madrid	183,374
36	Burgos	Burgos	175,821
37	Albacete	Albacete	173,329
38	Santander	Cantabria	172,539
39	Castellón de la Plana	Castellón	171,728
40	Alcorcón	Madrid	170,514
41	San Cristóbal de La Laguna	Santa Cruz de Tenerife	157,503
42	Logroño	La Rioja	151,136
43	Badajoz	Badajoz	150,702
44	Salamanca	Salamanca	144,228
45	Huelva	Huelva	143,663
46	Marbella	Málaga	143,386
47	Lleida	Lleida	138,956
48	Tarragona	Tarragona	134,515
49	Dos Hermanas	Seville	133,968
50	Torrejón de Ardoz	Madrid	131,376
51	Parla	Madrid	130,124
52	Mataró	Barcelona	128,265
53	León	León	124,303
54	Algeciras	Cádiz	121,957
55	Santa Coloma de Gramenet	Barcelona	119,215
56	Alcobendas	Madrid	117,040
57	Cádiz	Cádiz	116,027
58	Jaén	Jaén	112,999
59	Ourense	Ourense	105,233
60	Reus	Tarragona	104,373
61	Telde	Las Palmas	102,647
62	Girona	Girona	101,852
63	Barakaldo	Biscay	100,881
64	Lugo	Lugo	98,276
65	Santiago de Compostela	A Coruña	97,260
66	Roquetas de Mar	Almería	96,800
67	Cáceres	Cáceres	96,126
68	Las Rozas de Madrid	Madrid	95,814
69	San Fernando	Cádiz	94,979
70	Lorca	Murcia	94,404
71	Sant Cugat del Vallès	Barcelona	91,006
72	San Sebastián de los Reyes	Madrid	89,276
73	Cornellà de Llobregat	Barcelona	88,592
74	El Puerto de Santa María	Cádiz	88,405
75	Rivas-Vaciamadrid	Madrid	88,150
76	Melilla	Melilla	86,487
77	Pozuelo de Alarcón	Madrid	86,422
78	Guadalajara	Guadalajara	85,871
79	Toledo	Toledo	84,873
80	Ceuta	Ceuta	84,777
81	Chiclana de la Frontera	Cádiz	84,489
82	Sant Boi de Llobregat	Barcelona	83,605
83	El Ejido	Almería	83,594
84	Talavera de la Reina	Toledo	83,417
85	Torrevieja	Alicante	83,337
86	Pontevedra	Pontevedra	83,029
87	Mijas	Málaga	82,742
88	Torrent	Valencia	82,208
89	Coslada	Madrid	81,661
90	Vélez-Málaga	Málaga	81,643
91	Arona	Santa Cruz de Tenerife	81,216
92	Fuengirola	Málaga	80,309
93	Palencia	Palencia	78,412
94	Avilés	Asturias	78,182
95	Getxo	Biscay	77,946
96	Manresa	Barcelona	77,714
97	Rubí	Barcelona	77,464
98	Orihuela	Alicante	77,414
99	Valdemoro	Madrid	75,983
100	Alcalá de Guadaíra	Seville	75,279

=== By population density ===
The 100 most densely populated Spanish municipalities (2019).

#	Municipality	Province	Population density (inhabitants/km^{2})
1	Emperador	Valencia	22,900
2	Mislata	Valencia	21,522.66
3	L'Hospitalet de Llobregat	Barcelona	19,451.03
4	Benetússer	Valencia	18,973.08
5	Santa Coloma de Gramenet	Barcelona	16,814.53
6	Barcelona	Barcelona	16,514.6
7	Barañain	Navarre	14,531.65
8	Portugalete	Biscay	14,391.82
9	Badia del Vallès	Barcelona	14,387.1
10	Premià de Mar	Barcelona	14,346.43
11	Cornellà de Llobregat	Barcelona	12,990.03
12	Tavernes Blanques	Valencia	12,324.32
13	Burjassot	Valencia	11,053.49
14	Badalona	Barcelona	10,522.2
15	Esplugues de Llobregat	Barcelona	10,259.34
16	Sant Adrià de Besòs	Barcelona	9,814.02
17	Villava – Atarrabia	Navarre	9,626.42
18	Cádiz	Cádiz	9,433.09
19	Burlada – Burlata	Navarre	9,050.24
20	Ripollet	Barcelona	8,787.5
21	Bilbao	Biscay	8,379.87
22	Castilleja de la Cuesta	Seville	8,026.73
23	Pamplona	Navarre	8,021.2
24	Sestao	Biscay	7,754.55
25	Fuengirola	Málaga	7,744.36
26	Alaquàs	Valencia	7,579.74
27	El Masnou	Barcelona	7,325.55
28	Coslada	Madrid	6,799.42
29	Paiporta	Valencia	6,587.88
30	Getxo	Biscay	6,566.64
31	A Coruña	A Coruña	6,495.14
32	Sant Joan Despí	Barcelona	6,115.23
33	Melilla	Melilla	6,073.53
34	Basauri	Biscay	5,790.16
35	Xirivella	Valencia	5,774.46
36	Mataró	Barcelona	5,751.79
37	Valencia	Valencia	5,701.59
38	Sabadell	Barcelona	5,692.62
39	Sedaví	Valencia	5,646.45
40	Ansoáin – Antsoain	Navarre	5,612.95
41	Armilla	Granada	5,608.82
42	Madrid	Madrid	5,391.69
43	Parla	Madrid	5,309.02
44	Vilassar de Mar	Barcelona	5,261.87
45	Castelldefels	Barcelona	5,230.6
46	San Juan de Aznalfarache	Seville	5,210.71
47	Santurtzi	Biscay	5,163.63
48	Alcorcón	Madrid	5,055.26
49	Fuenlabrada	Madrid	4,905.04
50	Igualada	Barcelona	4,874.02
51	Seville	Seville	4,871.88
52	Sant Andreu de la Barca	Barcelona	4,860.32
53	Tomares	Seville	4,858.05
54	Santander	Cantabria	4,782.12
55	Mollet del Vallès	Barcelona	4,751.67
56	Salt	Girona	4,744.63
57	Gines	Seville	4,643.6
58	Móstoles	Madrid	4,619.79
59	Maracena	Granada	4,522.7
60	La Llagosta	Barcelona	4,478.41
61	Eivissa	Balearic Islands	4,468.85
62	Leganés	Madrid	4,406.15
63	Ceuta	Ceuta	4,266.58
64	Montgat	Barcelona	4,210.14
65	Granollers	Barcelona	4,098.66
66	Lekeitio	Biscay	4,082.12
67	Benirredrà	Valencia	4,082.05
68	Barberà del Vallès	Barcelona	4,045.35
69	Caldes d'Estrac	Barcelona	4,029.73
70	Torrejón de Ardoz	Madrid	4,027.47
71	Barakaldo	Biscay	4,015.96
72	Sant Hipòlit de Voltregà	Barcelona	3,871.11
73	Berriozar	Navarre	3,847.23
74	Leioa	Biscay	3,785.12
75	Sant Boi de Llobregat	Barcelona	3,777.9
76	Sant Feliu de Llobregat	Barcelona	3,753.97
77	Las Palmas de Gran Canaria	Las Palmas	3,677.17
78	Salamanca	Salamanca	3,666.19
79	Etxebarri	Biscay	3,536.09
80	Bonrepòs i Mirambell	Valencia	3,515.24
81	Puerto de la Cruz	Santa Cruz de Tenerife	3,450.51
82	Torremolinos	Málaga	3,450.3
83	Viladecans	Barcelona	3,320.59
84	Maleján	Zaragoza	3,237.5
85	León	León	3,184.81
86	Terrassa	Barcelona	3,137.8
87	Cájar	Granada	3,108.48
88	San Fernando	Cádiz	3,098.83
89	Rocafort	Valencia	3,094.02
90	San Sebastián	Gipuzkoa	3,077.93
91	Lasarte-Oria	Gipuzkoa	3,058.24
92	Sant Vicenç dels Horts	Barcelona	3,036.39
93	Llocnou de la Corona	Valencia	2,950
94	Zizur Mayor/Zizur Nagusia	Navarre	2,949.31
95	Alboraya	Valencia	2,932.13
96	Avilés	Asturias	2,916.15
97	Rafal	Alicante	2,864.97
98	Huétor Vega	Granada	2,839.39
99	Roda de Ter	Barcelona	2,825.56
100	Durango	Biscay	2,776.42

== Gallery ==
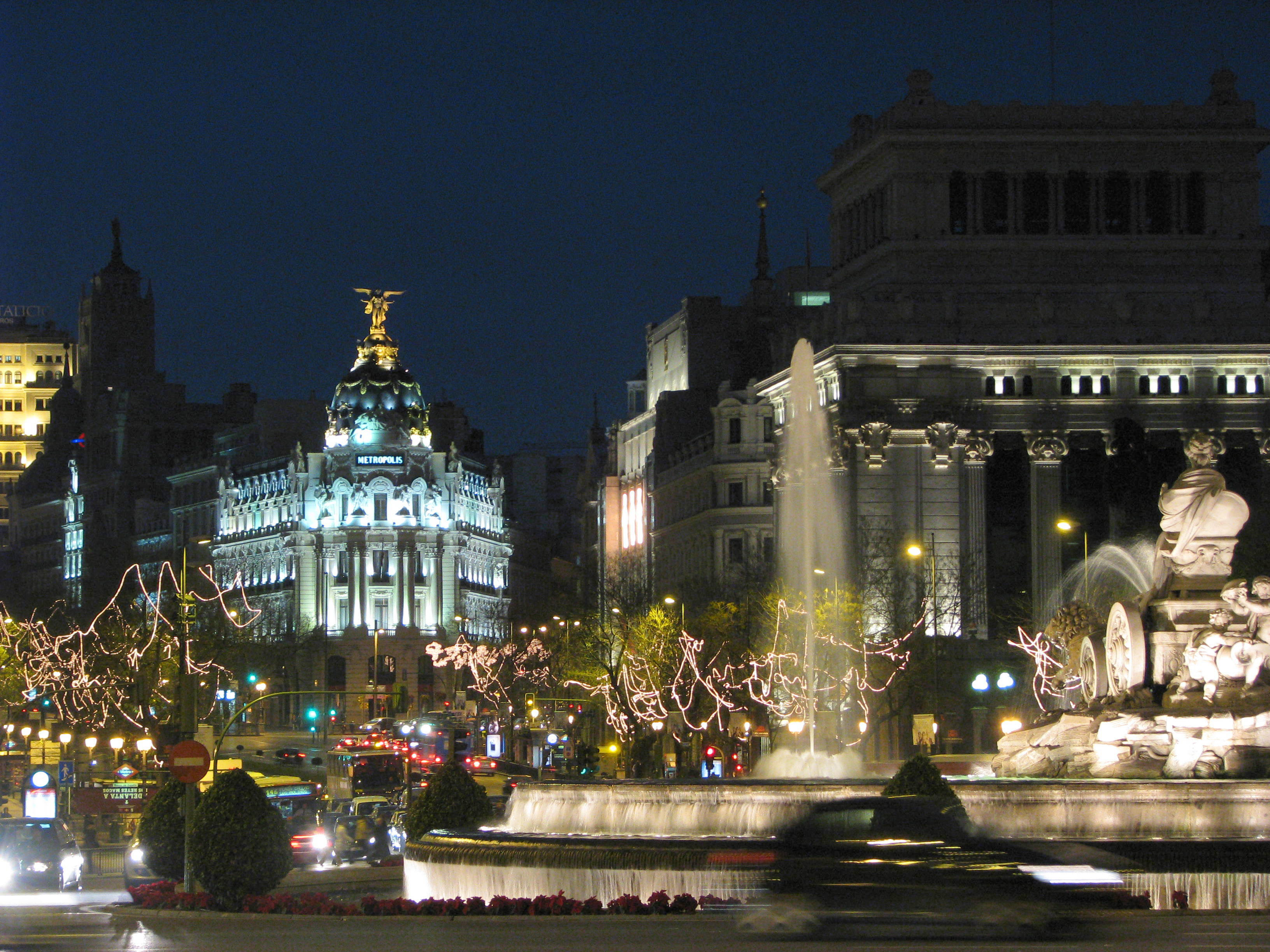
Madrid

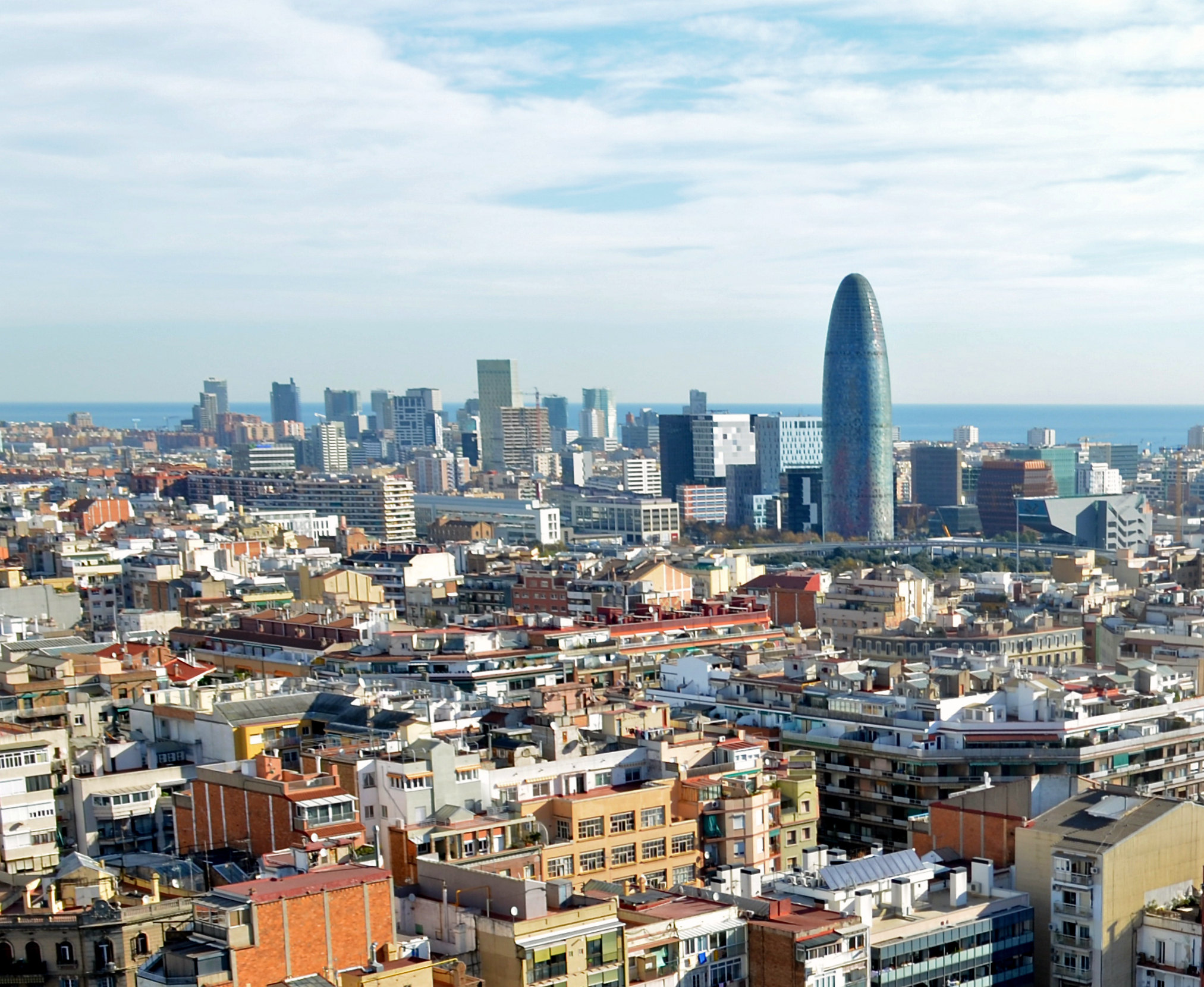
Barcelona

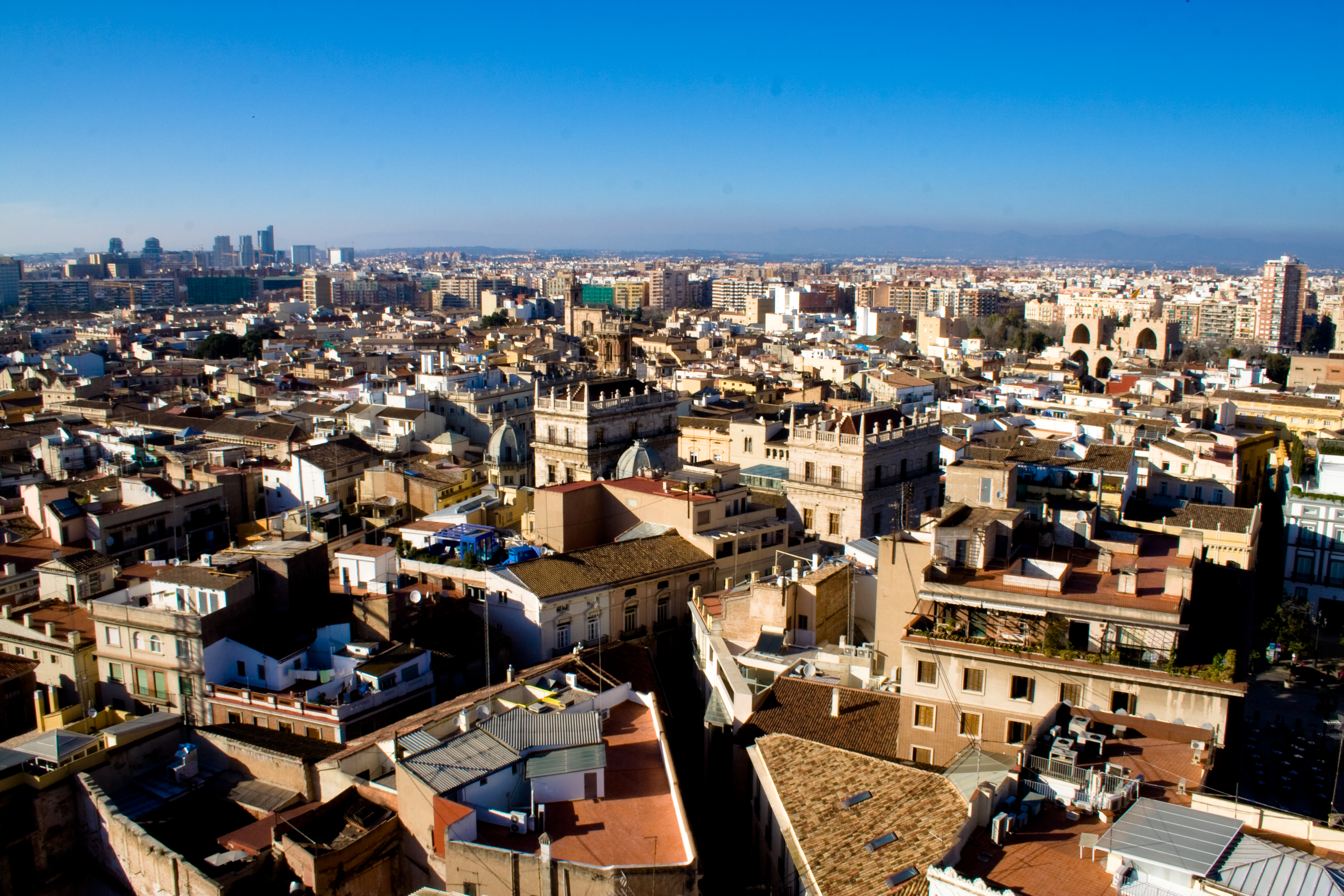
Valencia

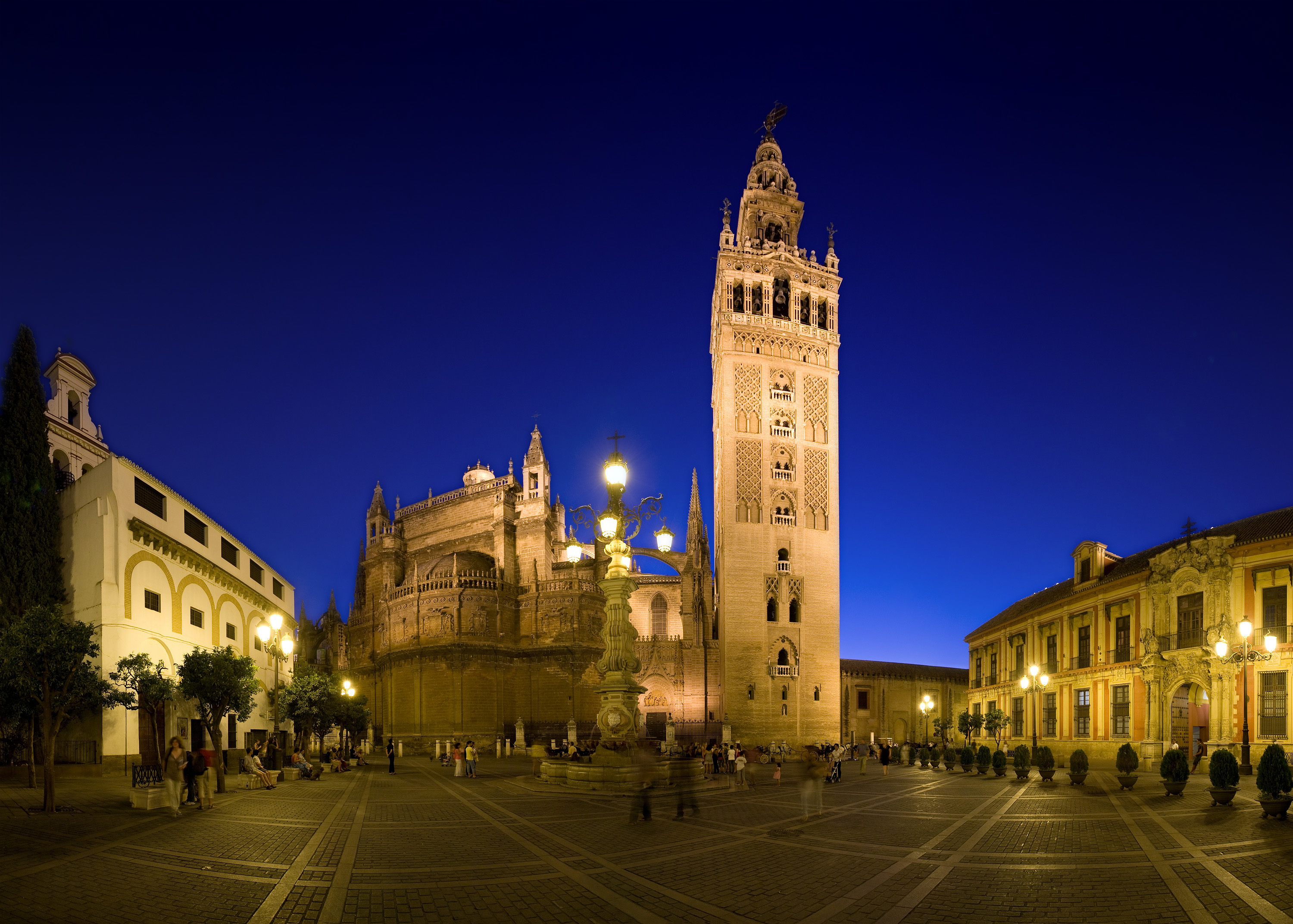
Seville

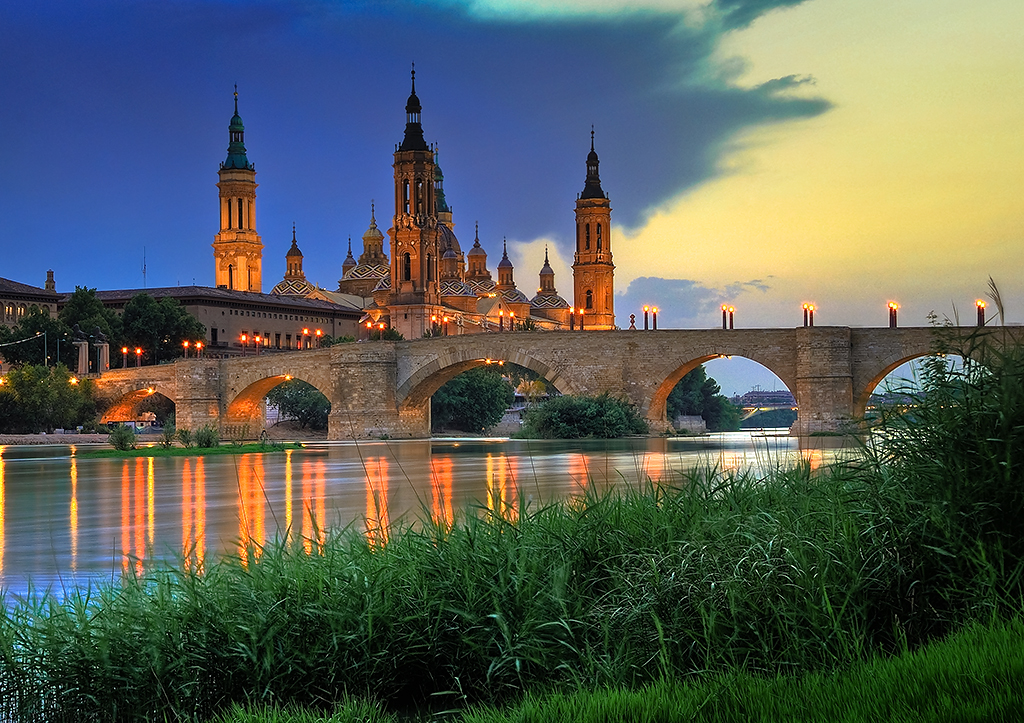
Zaragoza

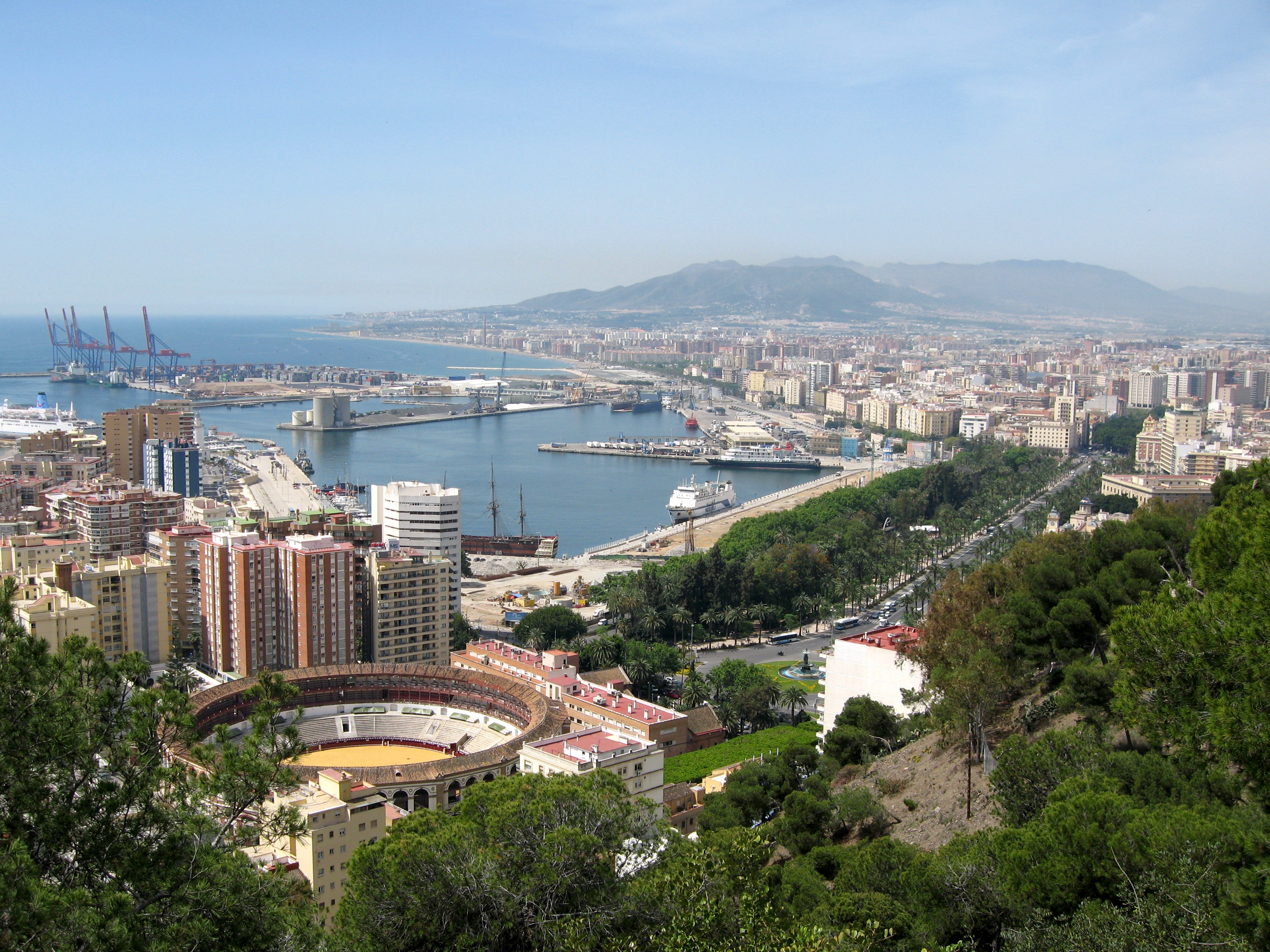
Málaga

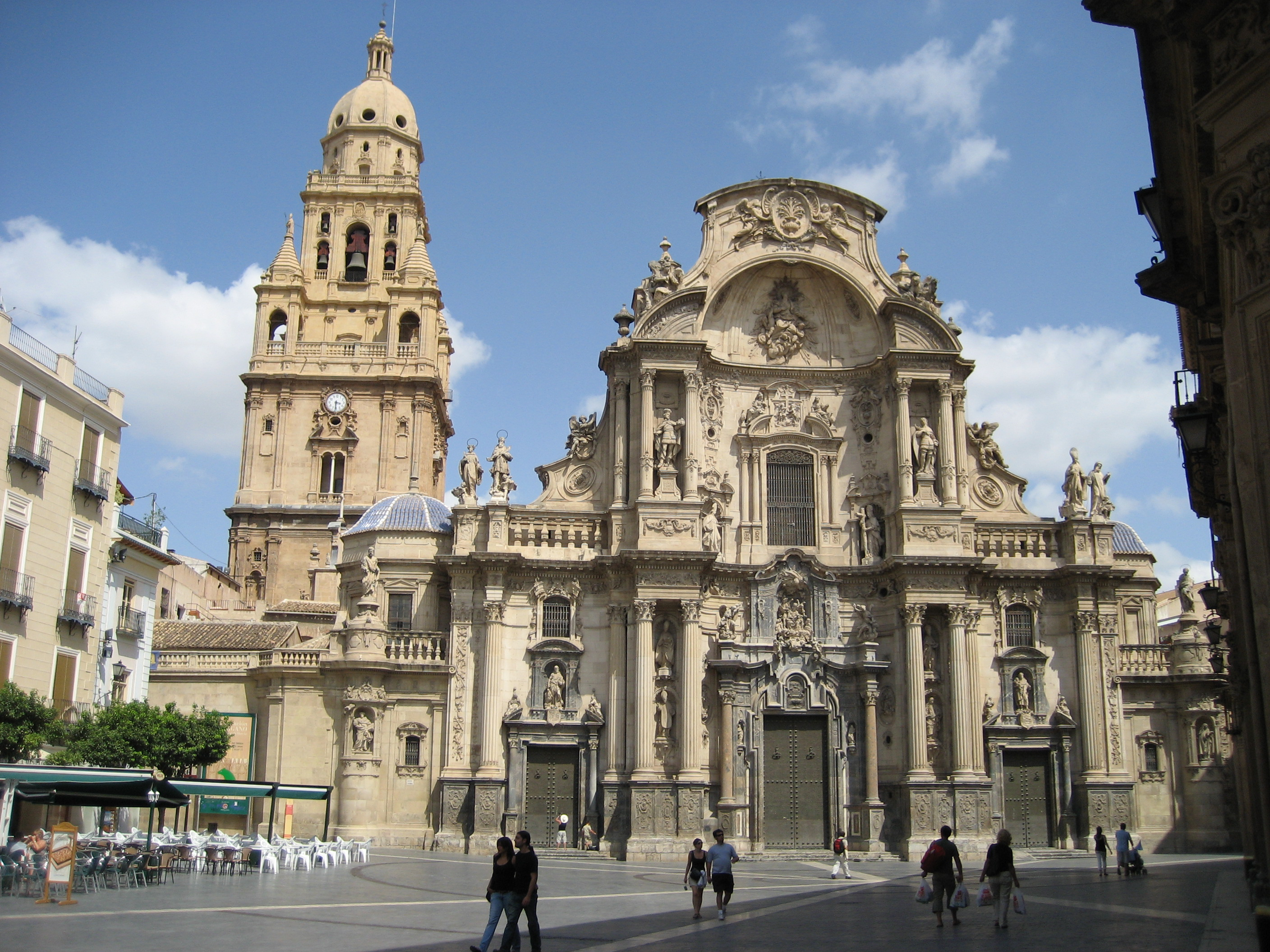
Murcia

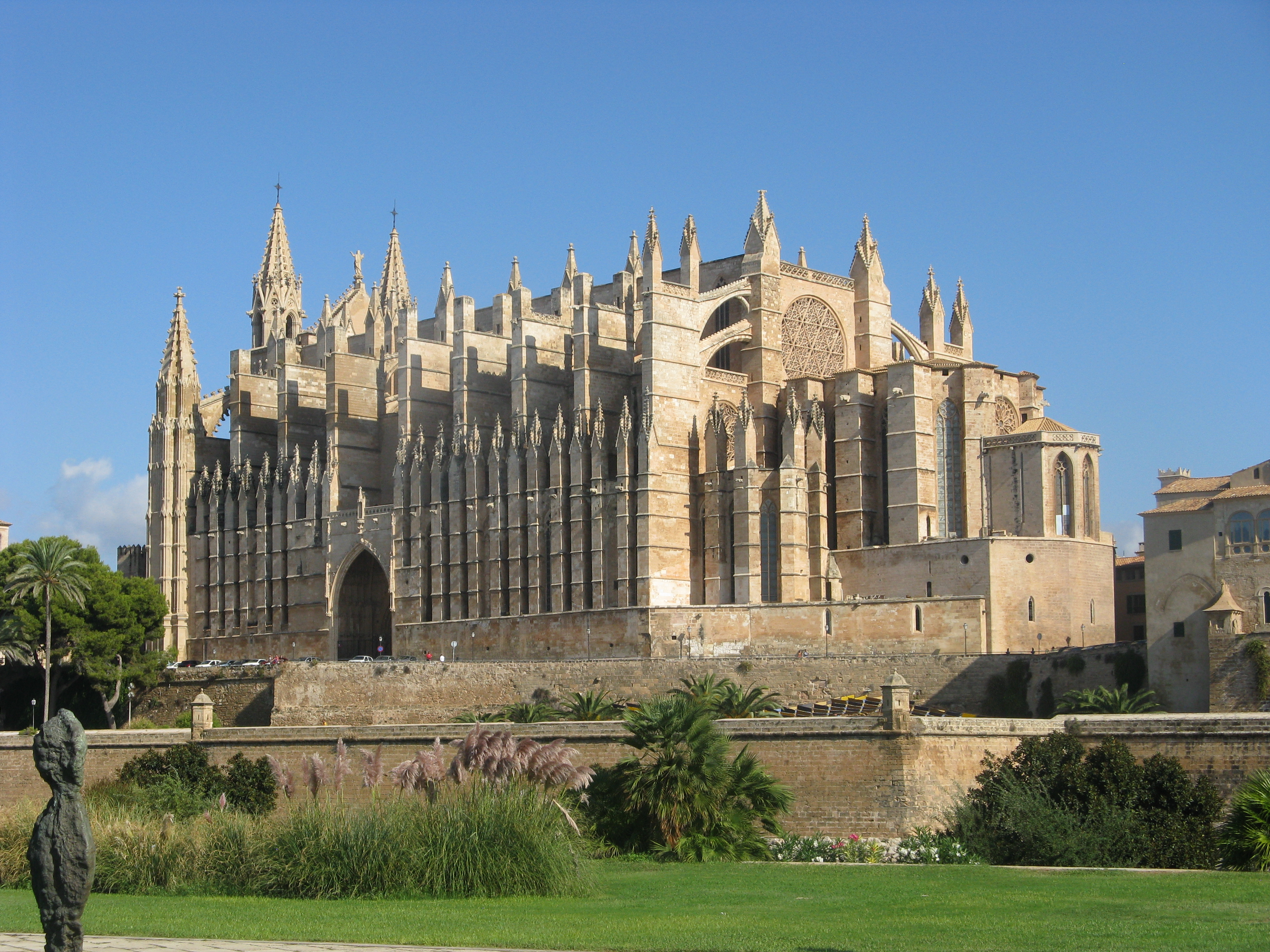
Palma

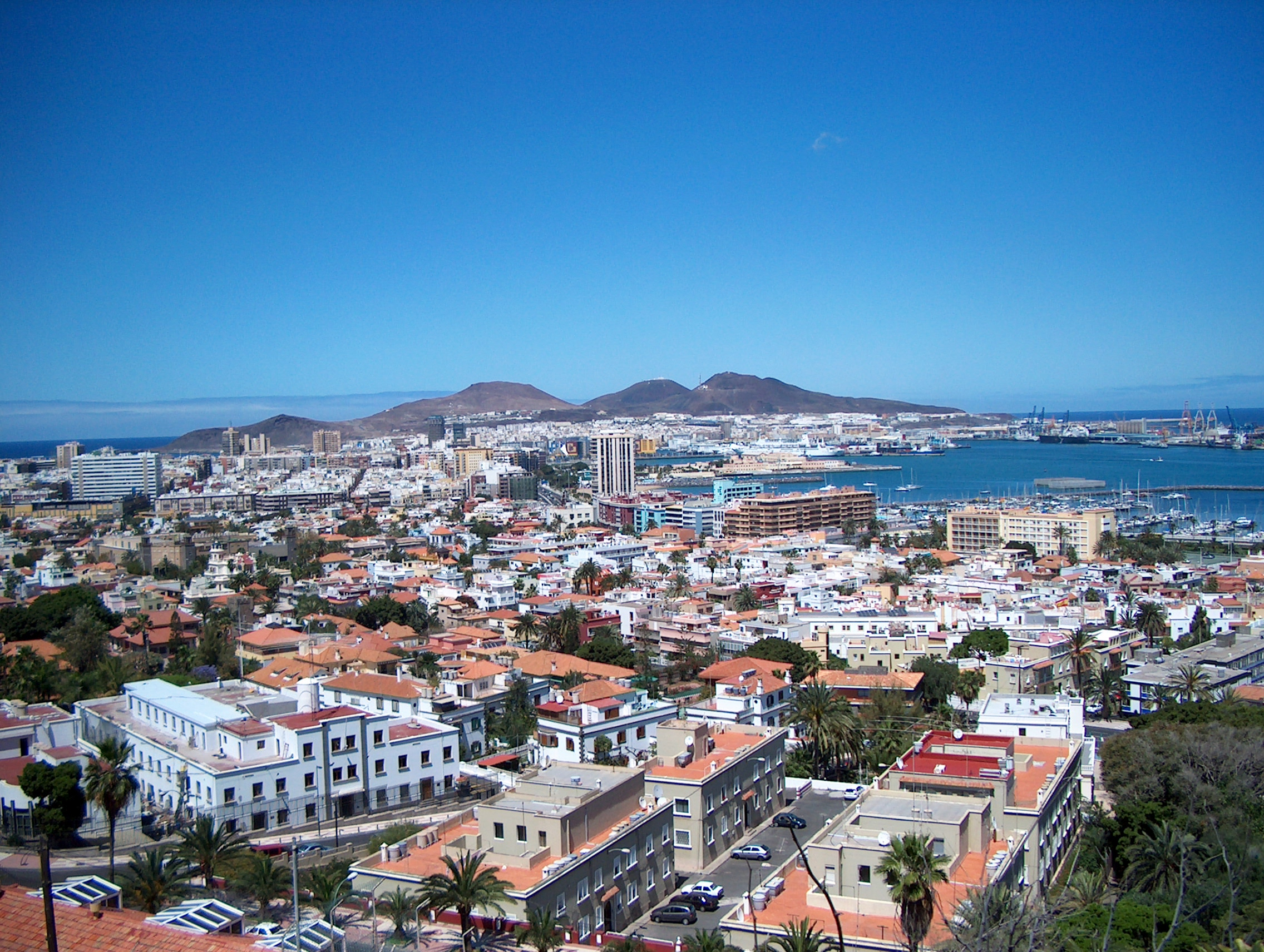
Las Palmas

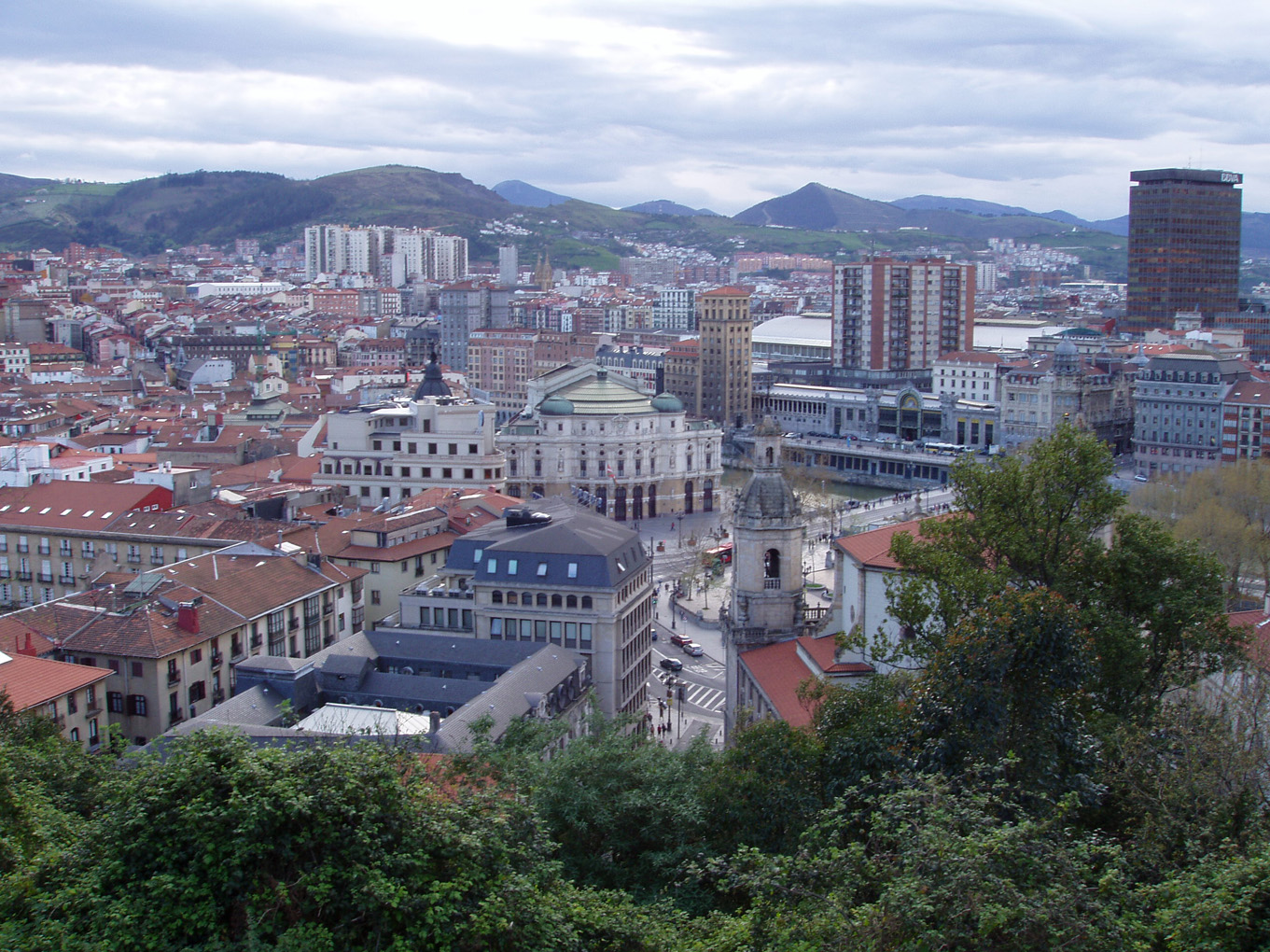
Bilbao

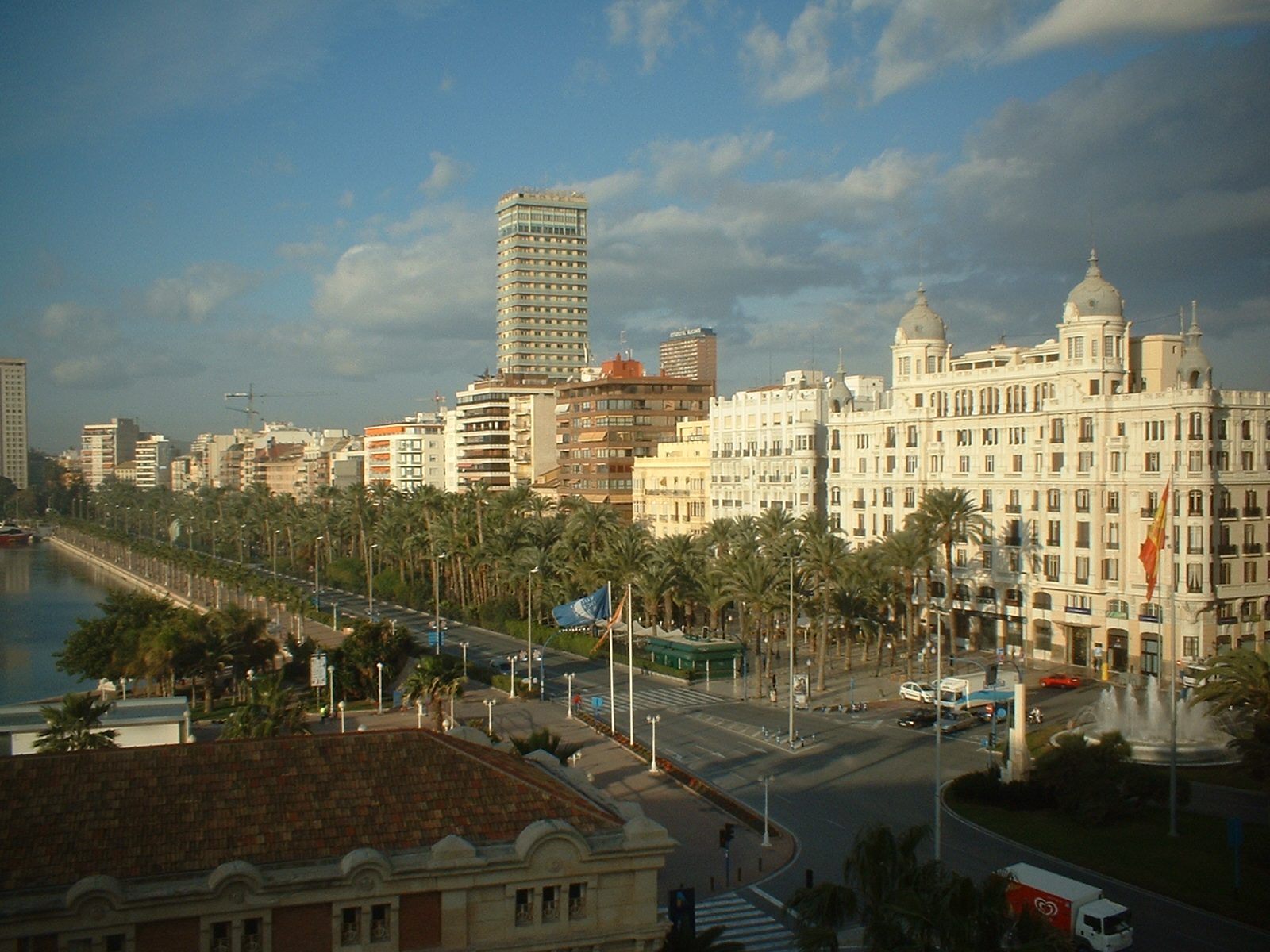
Alicante

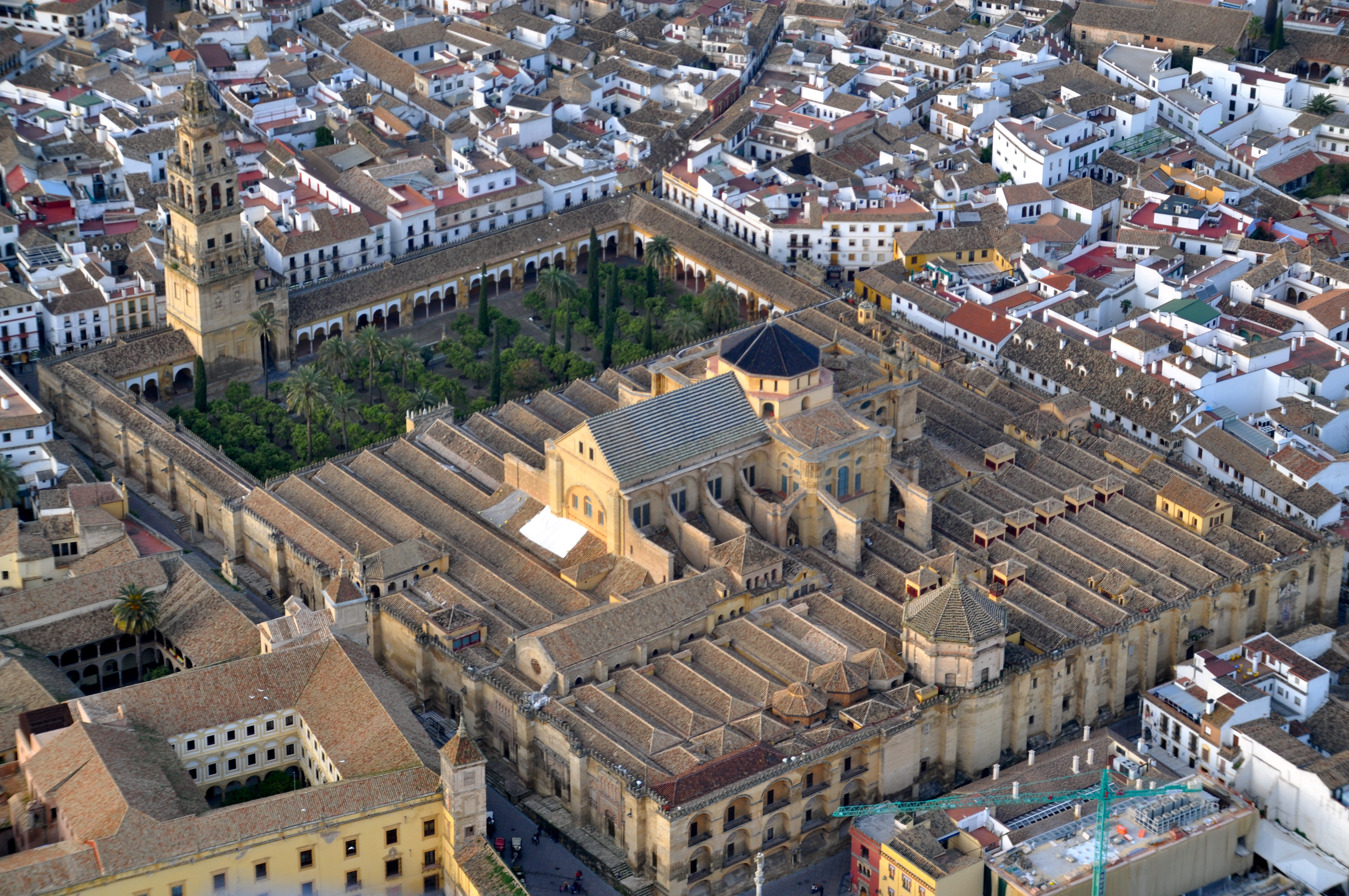
Córdoba

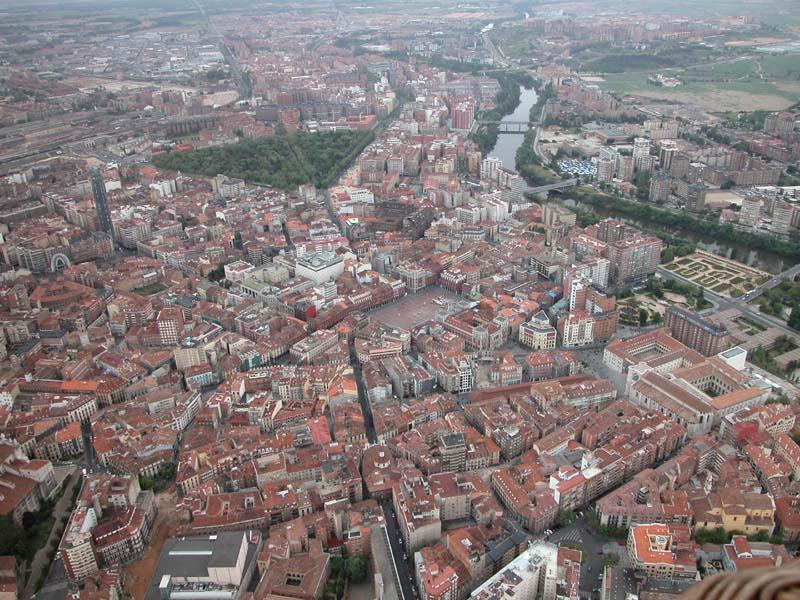
Valladolid

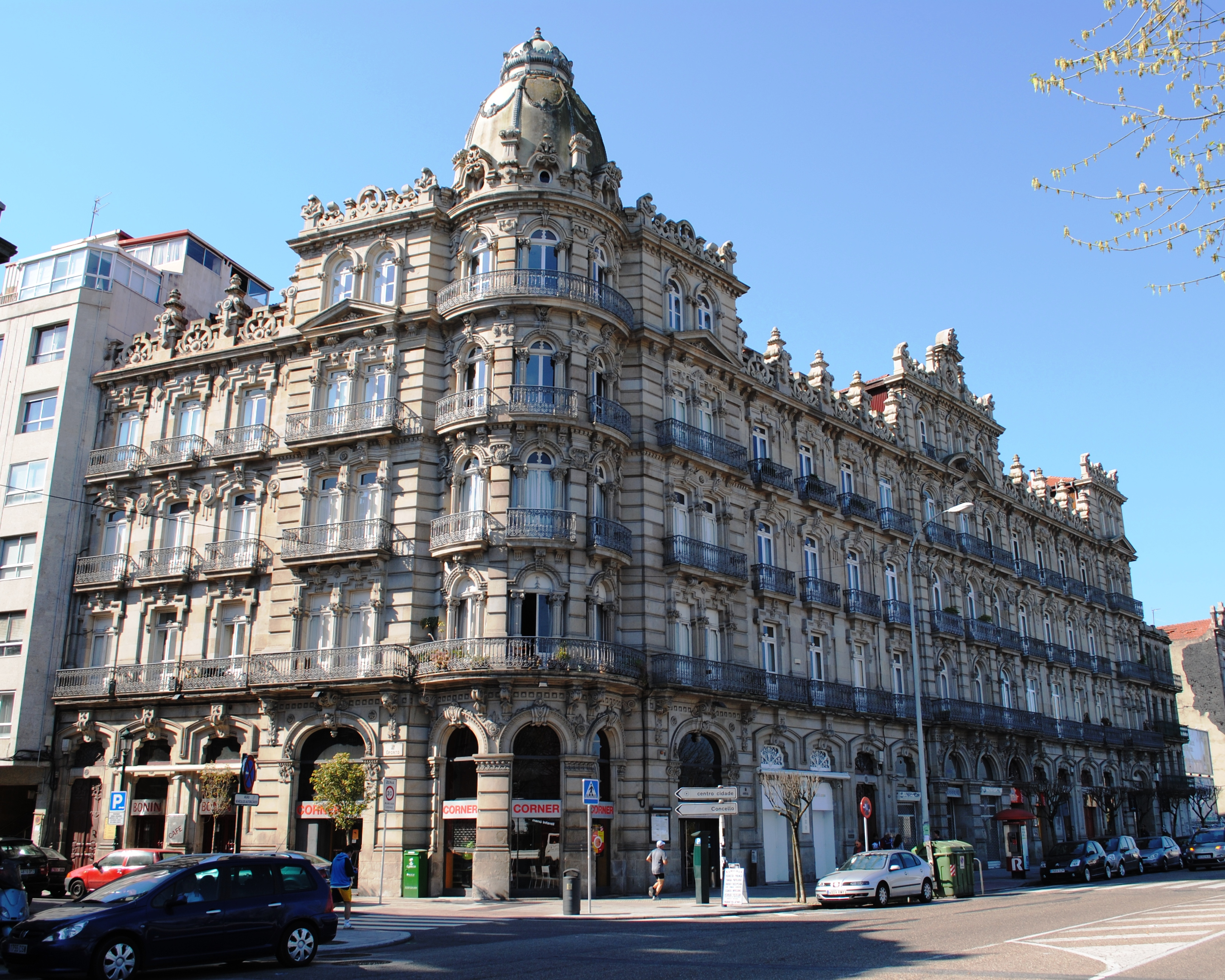
Vigo

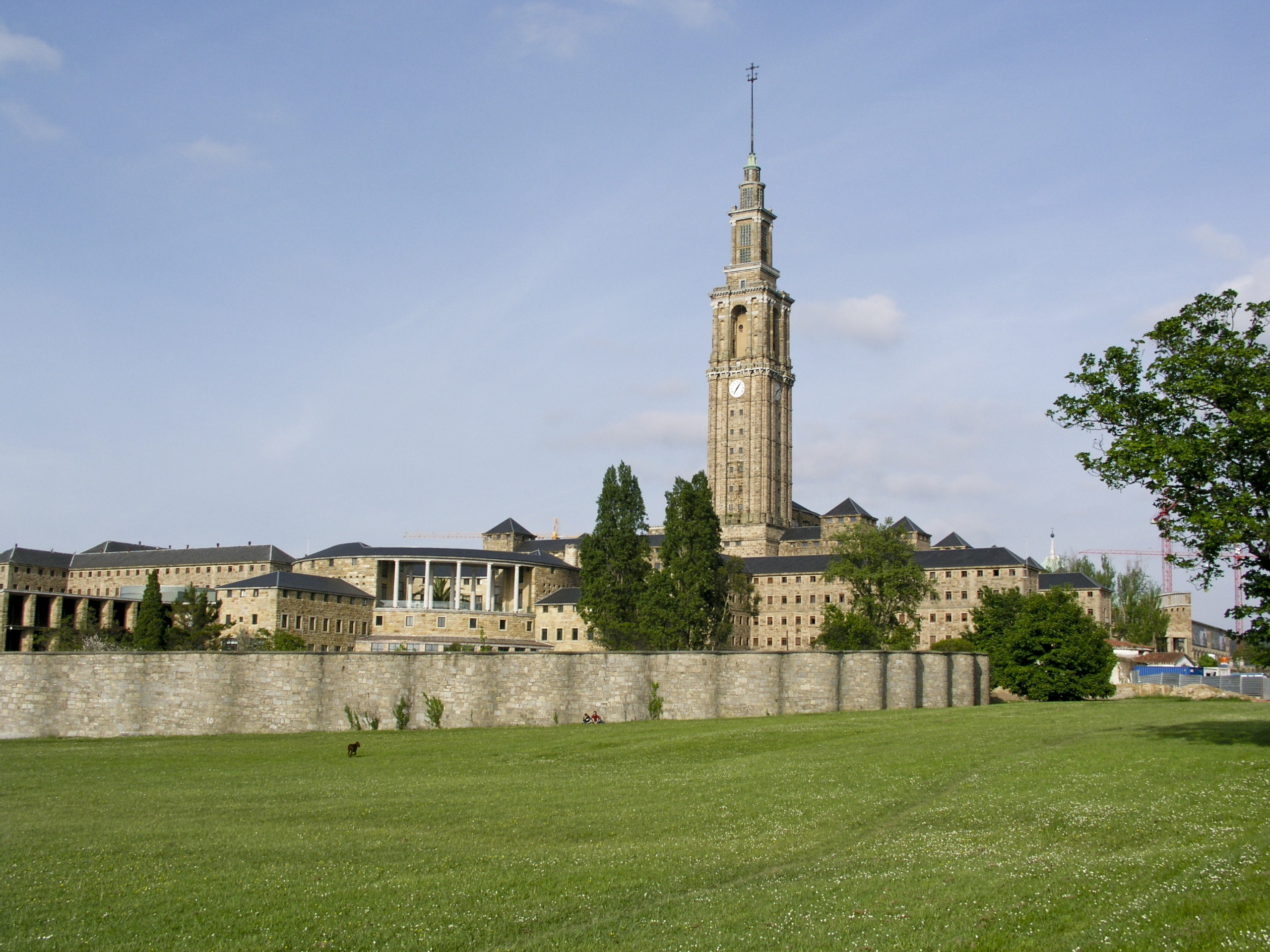
Gijón

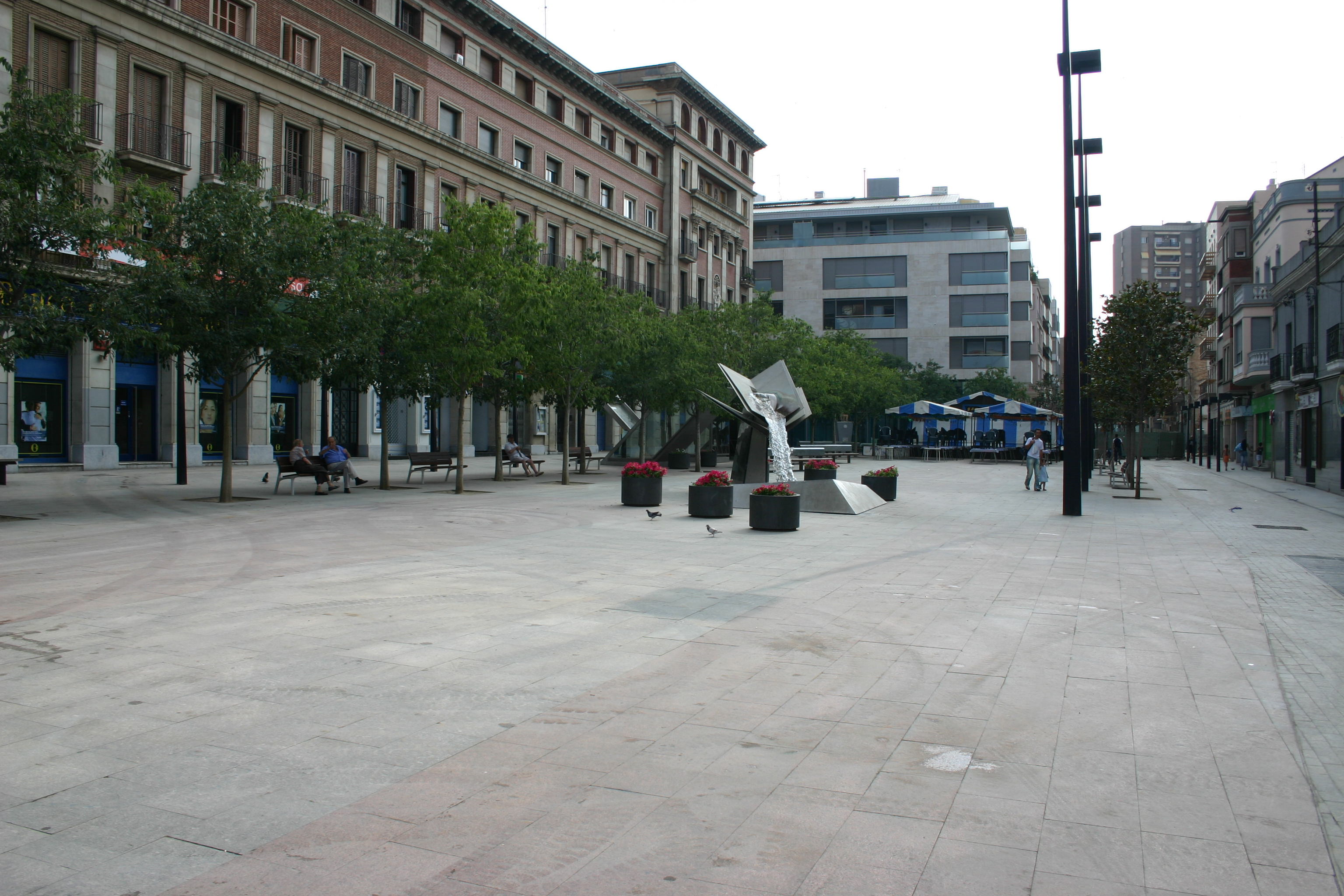
L'Hospitalet de Llobregat

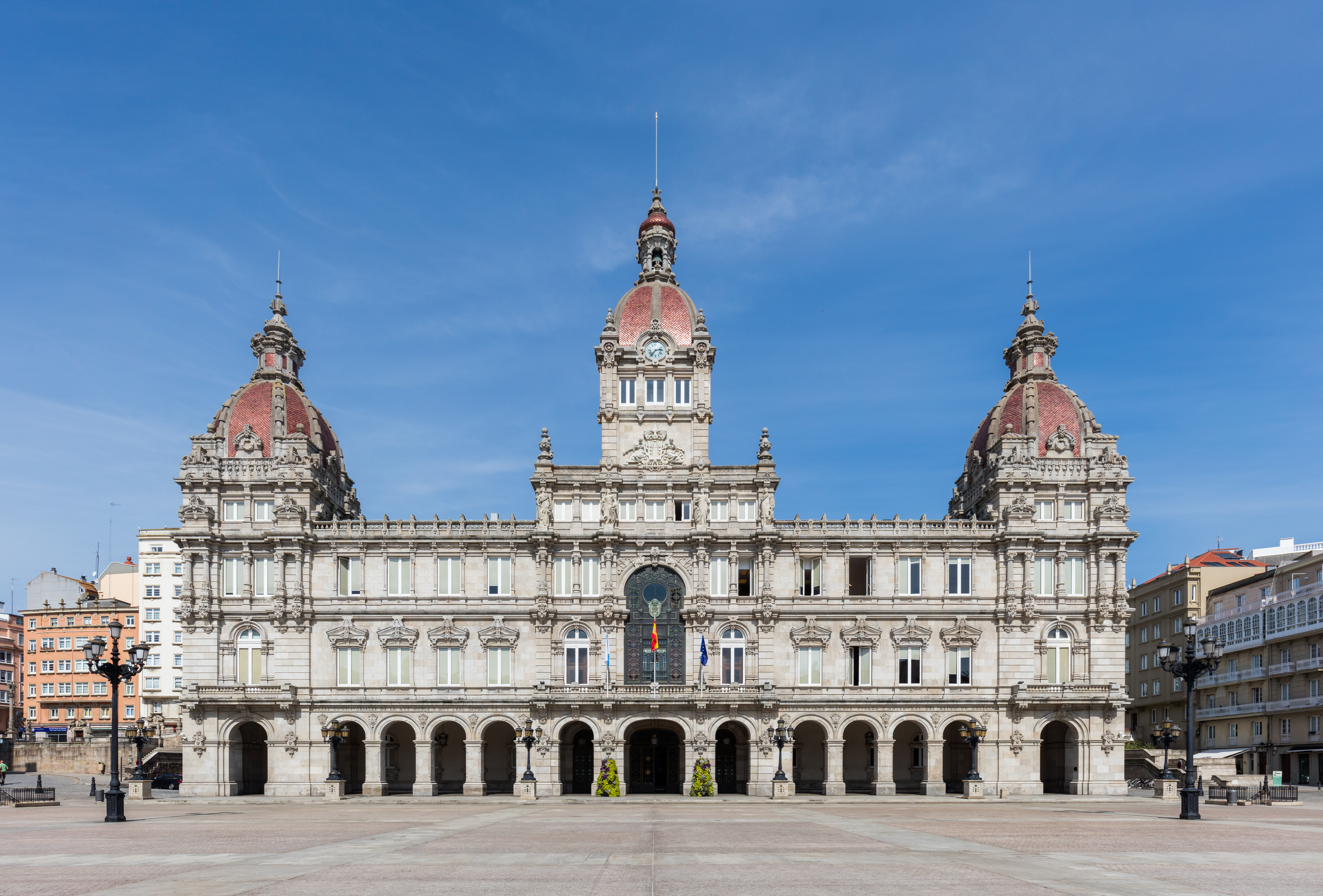
A Coruña

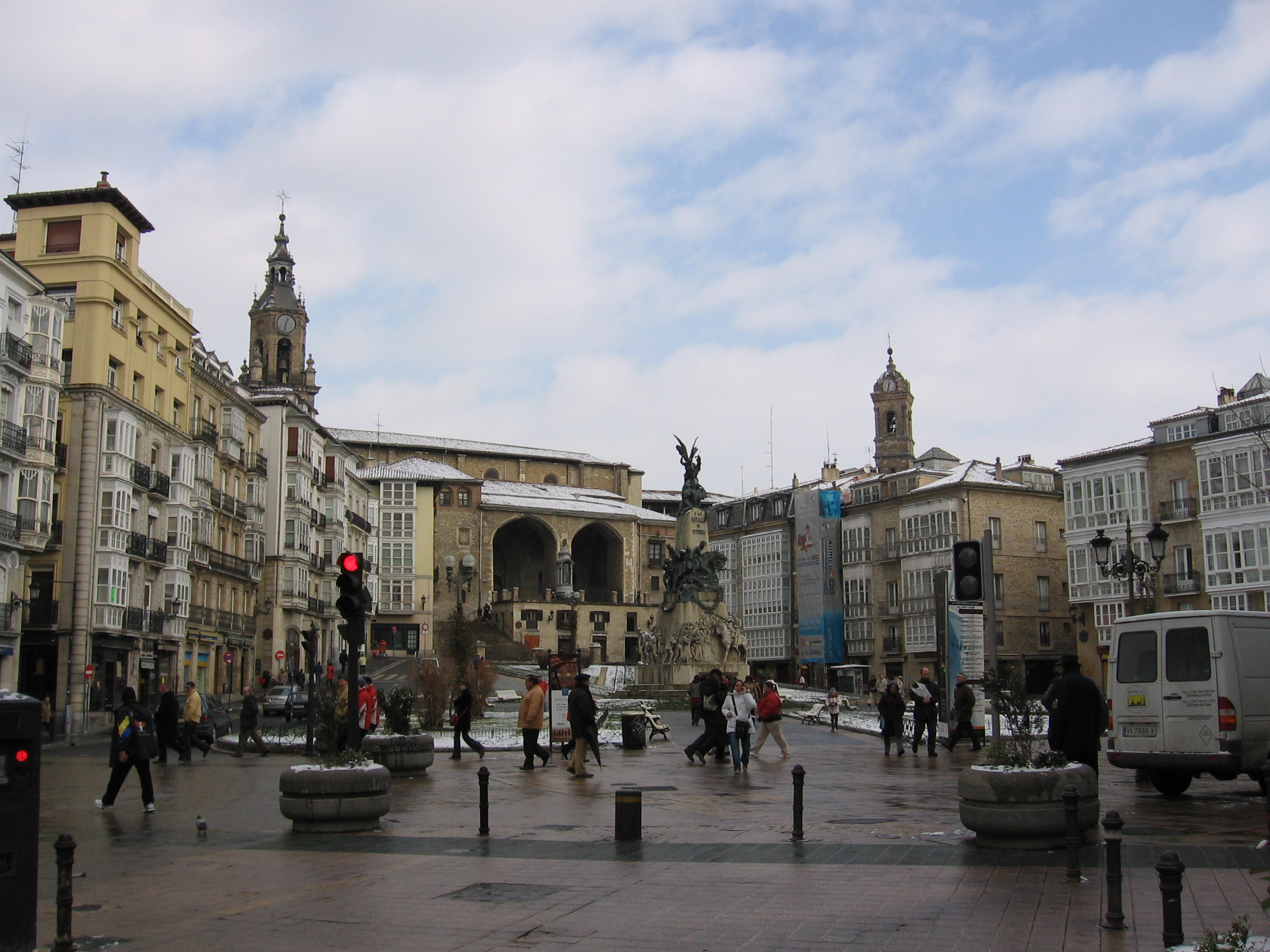
Vitoria-Gasteiz

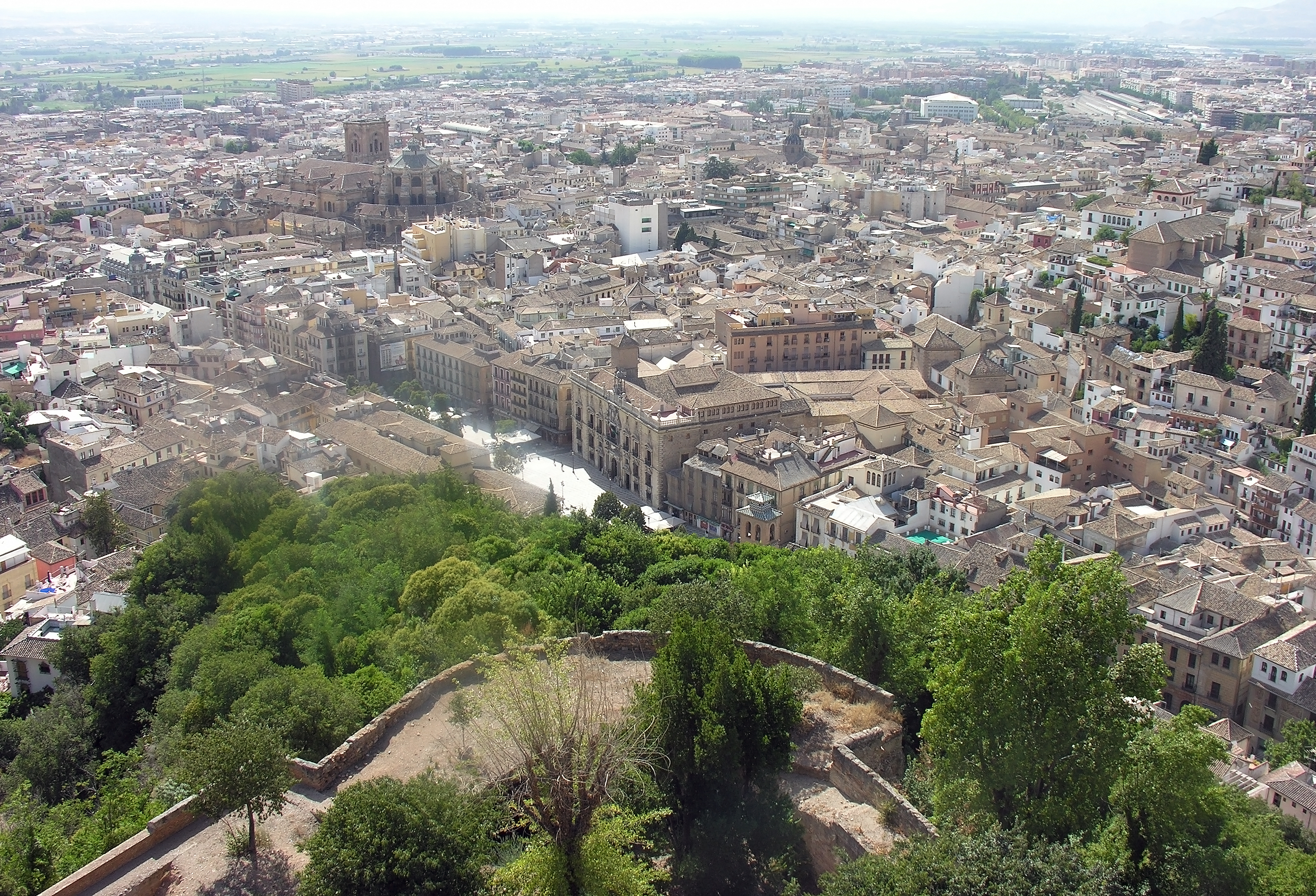
Granada

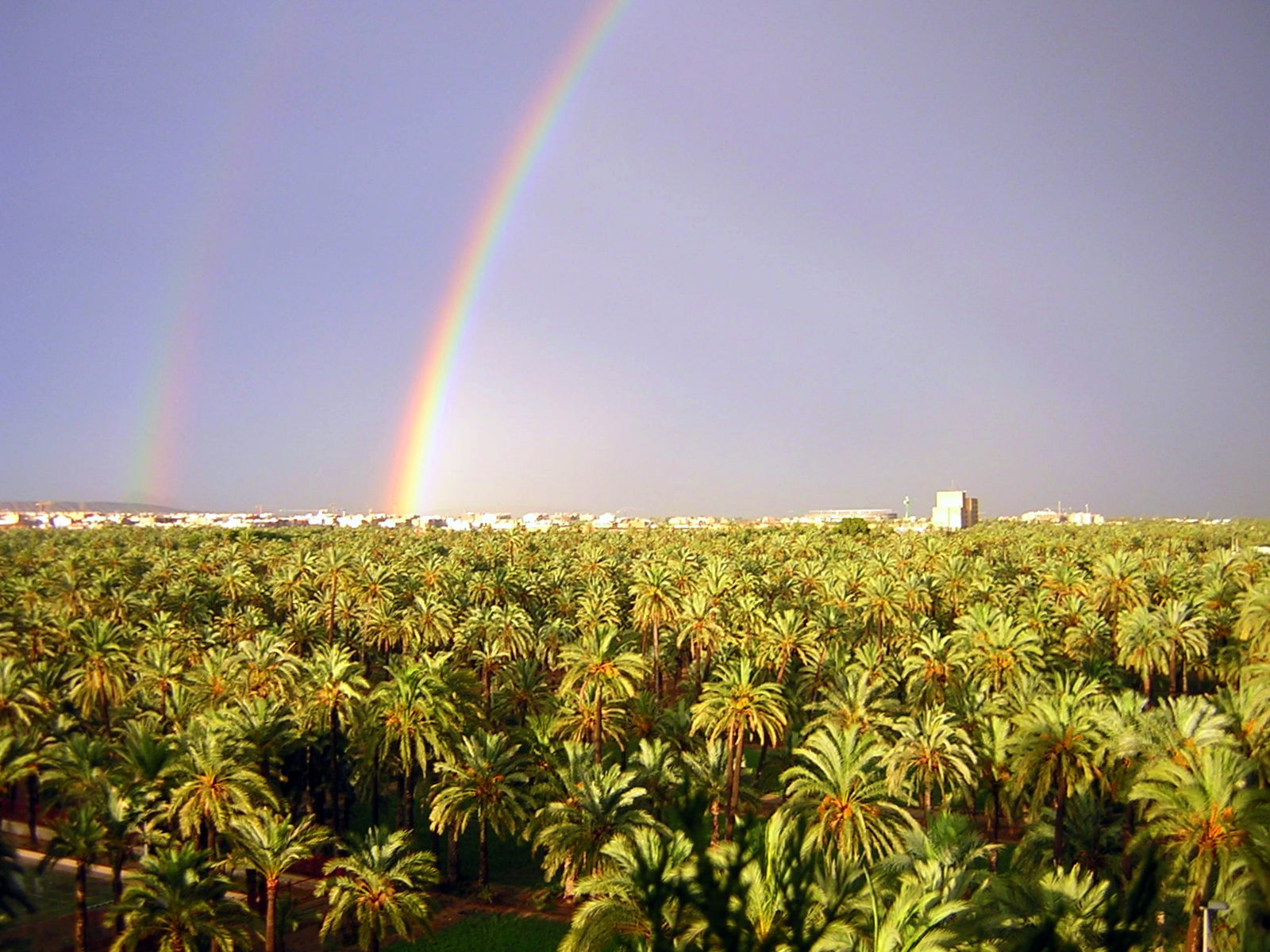
Elche

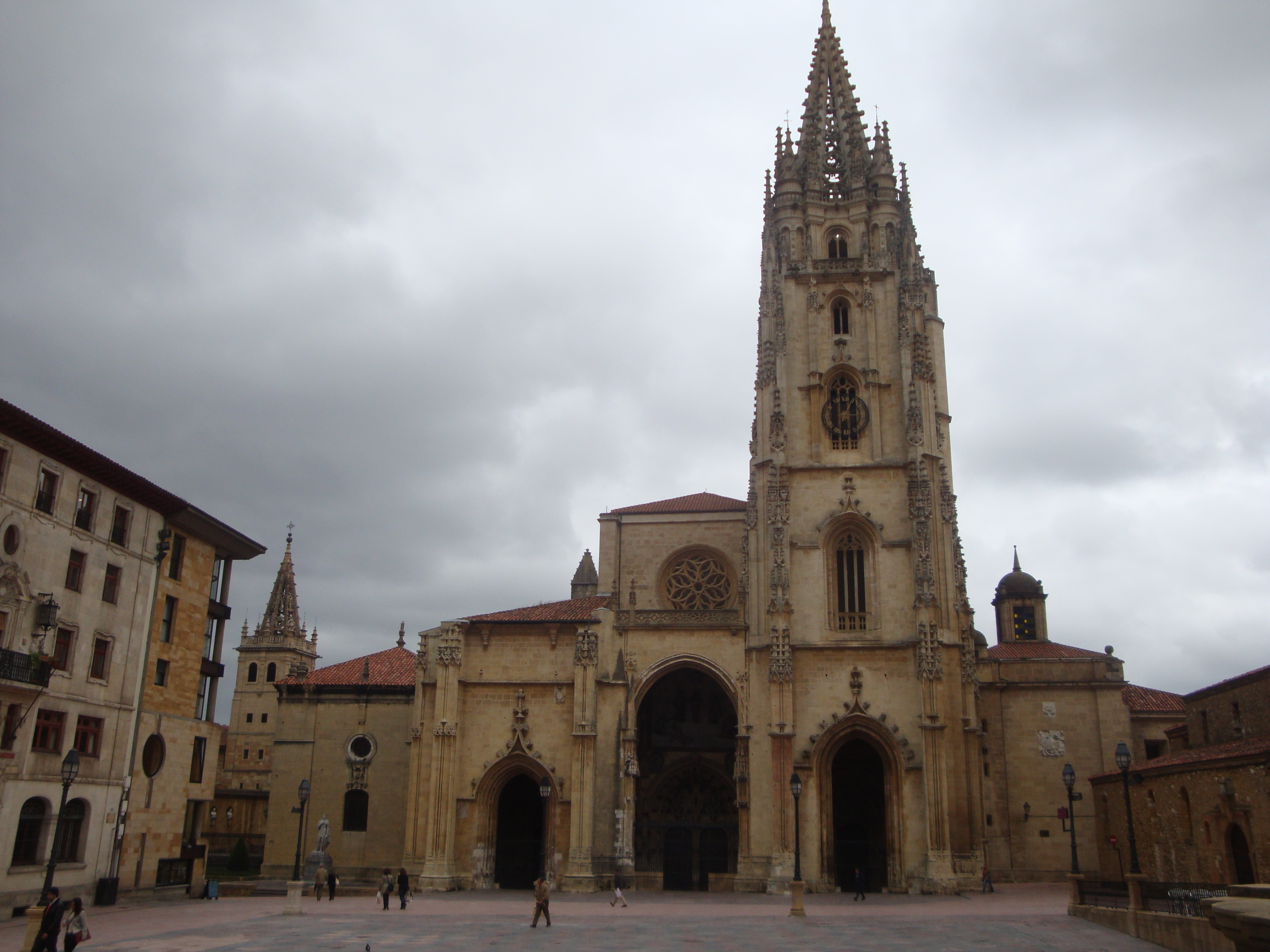
Oviedo

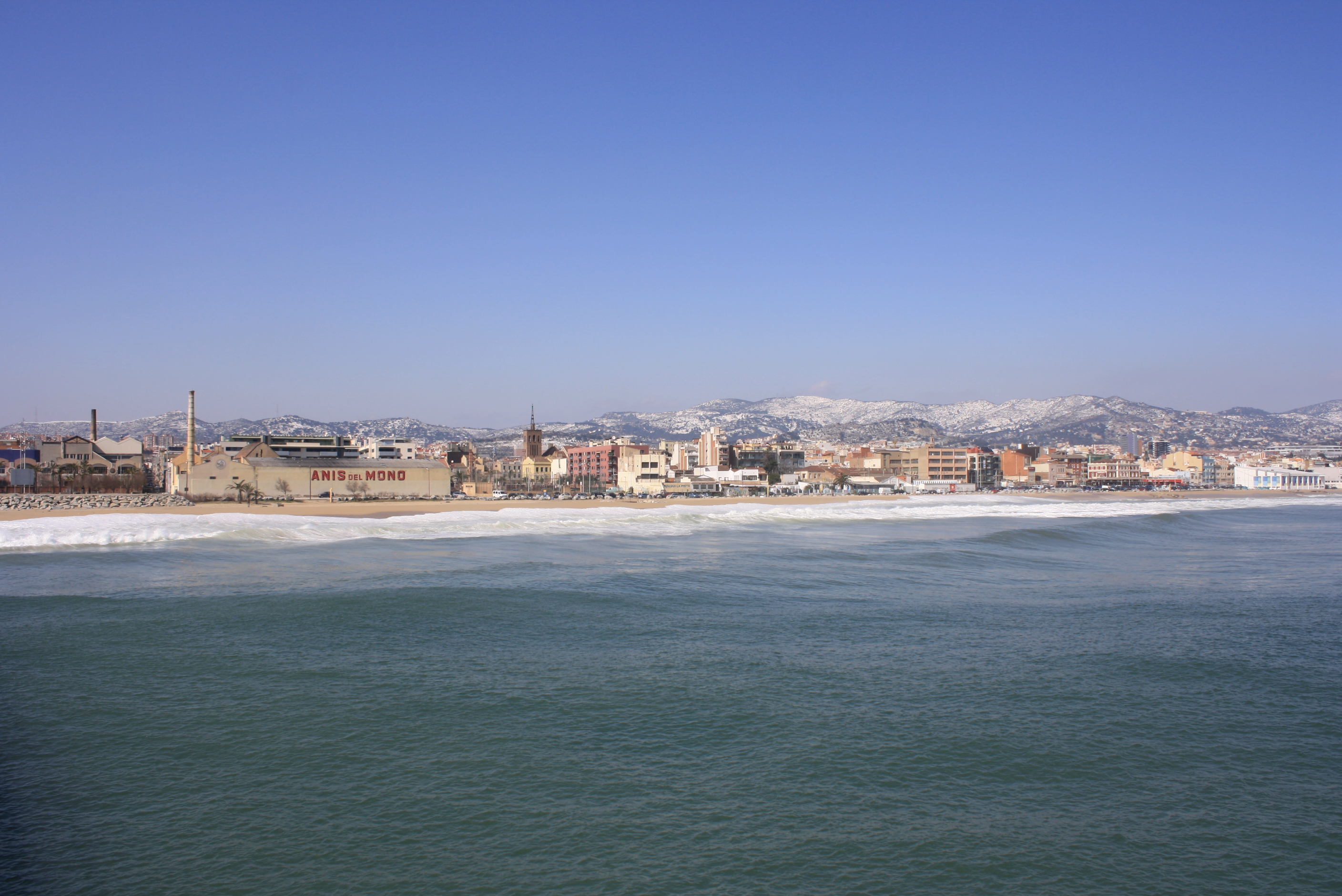
Badalona

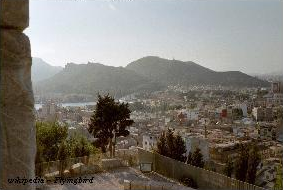
Cartagena

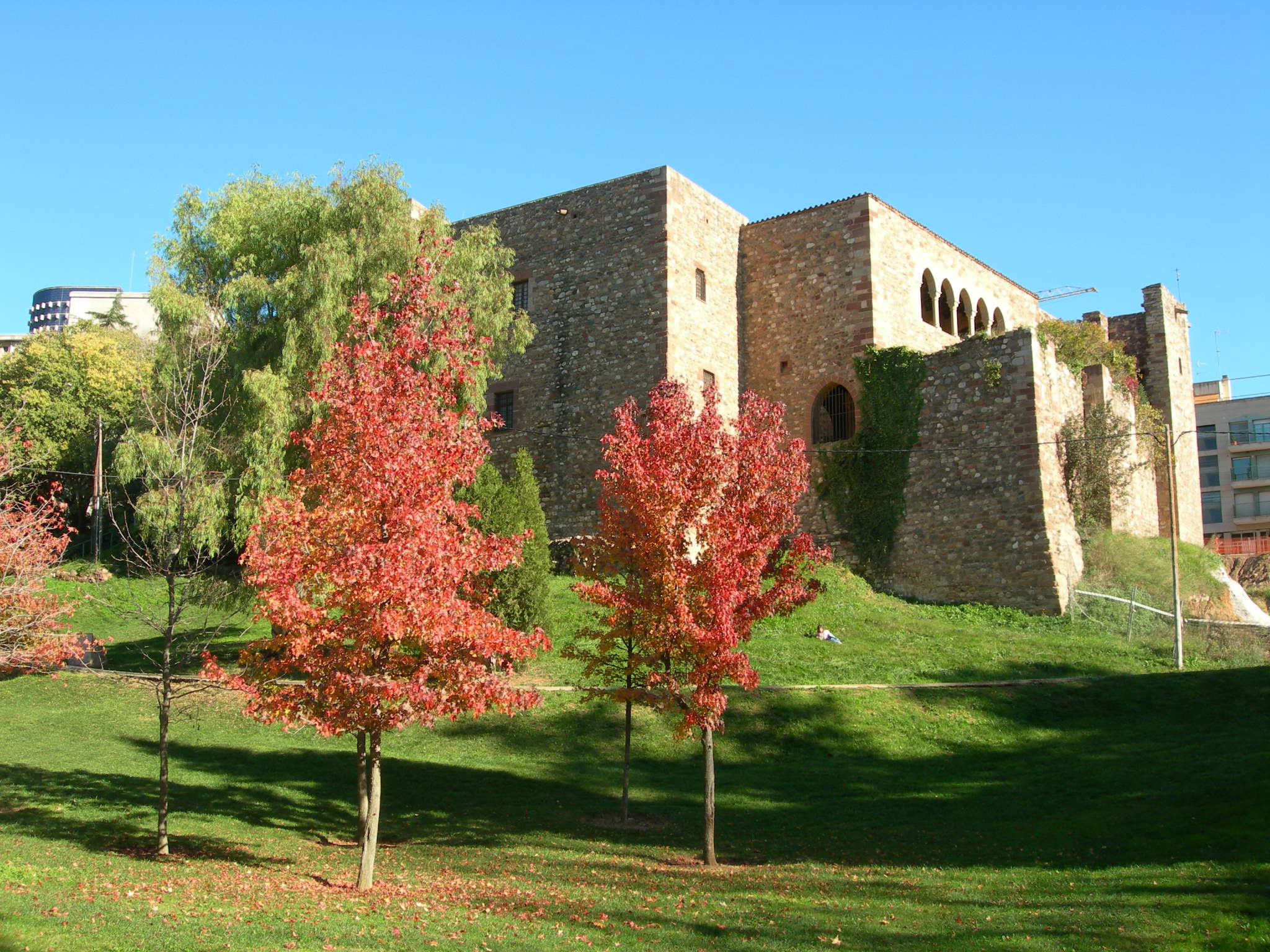
Terrassa

== See also ==
- Municipalities of Spain
- Local government in Spain
- List of metropolitan areas in Spain by population
- List of submerged places in Spain
