= Castilian Unity =

Castilian Unity Unidad Castellana
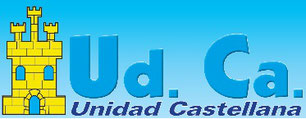
- Leader: Emilio Nieto López
- Founded: December 2001
- Headquarters: Calle Morería, Nº4 . Ciudad Real, Castilla-La Mancha
- Ideology: Castilian nationalism Regionalism; Conservatism
- Political position: Centre-right to right-wing
- Mayors in Castilla y León: 3 / 2,248
- Local Government in Castilla y León: 14 / 12,481
- Local Government in Castilla-La Mancha: 3 / 6,383

Website
- unidadcastellana.es

Flag of Castile used by UdCa.

Castilian Unity (Spanish: Unidad Castellana, UdCa) is a moderate conservative Castilian nationalist political party active in Castilla-La Mancha. UdCa was founded in Ciudad Real by Emilio López Nieto, former secretary general of the PP in Ciudad Real, in December 2001 and formed, in part, by former members of the Regionalist Party of Castilla-La Mancha (PRCM). Its implementation outside the province of Ciudad Real is negligible.

== Ideology ==
UdCa defends the creation of a Castilian autonomous community, unifying the current 5 Castilian autonomies: Castilla y León, Castilla-La Mancha, Cantabria, Community of Madrid y La Rioja. UdCa is seen as a regionalist party, although its president, Emilio Nieto, defends that Castile is a nation in Spain, so the party is also usually categorized as moderate nationalist organization. The party is also conservative and positioned in the centre-right.

== History ==
In the local elections of 2003 UdCa gained the mayorship in Puebla de Don Rodrigo and a total of 6 town councillors. In the local elections of 2023 the party gained 8 councillors in the Province of Valladolid, 3 in the Ciudad Real and 6 in Palencia. UdCa also won the mayoral elections of Lomoviejo, Matilla de los Caños and Cevico de la Torre, all of them in Castille and León.
