= Alexandru Lazăr =

Romanian footballer

Personal information
- Date of birth: 20 February 1991 (age 35)
- Place of birth: Bucharest, Romania
- Height: 1.78 m (5 ft 10 in)
- Position: Central midfielder

Team information
- Current team: Recambios Colón
- Number: 11

Youth career
- –1999: ES Parisienne
- 1999–2003: Paris Saint-Germain
- 2003–2006: Levante
- 2006–2009: Steaua București

Senior career*
Years	Team	Apps	(Gls)
2009–2011	Steaua II București	52	(5)
2011–2014	Viitorul Constanța	89	(6)
2014–2016	ACS Poli Timișoara	5	(0)
2016	Berceni	12	(1)
2016	Ontinyent	0	(0)
2016	Messina	5	(0)
2017–2018	Academica Clinceni	21	(1)
2018–2019	Paiporta CF	44	(3)
2019–2020	Castellonense	1	(0)
2020–2021	Concordia Chiajna	17	(0)
2021–2022	Metaloglobus București	15	(0)
2022	Soneja	12	(1)
2022	Paiporta CF	4	(1)
2022–	Recambios Colón	55	(0)

International career
2010	Romania U19	3	(0)
- * Club domestic league appearances and goals as of 18 May 2024

Alexandru Lazăr (20 February 1991) is a Romanian footballer who plays as a midfielder for Spanish club Recambios Colón.

== Honours ==
ACS Poli Timișoara

- Liga II: 2014–15
