= CF Recambios Colón =

Spanish football club

Recambios Colón
- Full name: Club de Fútbol Recambios Colón Catarroja
- Founded: 2003
- Ground: El Perdiguer, Aldaia, Valencia, Spain
- Capacity: 1,000
- President: Juan Tamarit
- Head coach: Luis Navarro
- League: Lliga Comunitat – North
- 2025–26: Tercera Federación – Group 6, 18th of 18 (relegated)
Home colours	Away colours

Club de Fútbol Recambios Colón Catarroja, sometimes referred to as Recambios Colón Club Deportivo, known as Recambios Colón, is a Spanish football team based in Catarroja, in the Valencian Community. Founded in 2003, it plays in Lliga Comunitat – North, holding home matches at Complex Poliesportiu El Perdiguer in Aldaia.

== History ==
Founded in 2003 as a football section for workers of the company with the same name, Recambios Colón played in Catarroja until moving to Sedaví. In 2015, they first reached Tercera División after achieving promotion from the Regional Preferente in the play-offs.

In 2017, Recambios Colón changed name from CF Recambios Colón Valencia to CF Recambios Colón Catarroja, to reflect the original location of the company which owns the club. They suffered relegation in 2018, but returned to the fourth tier immediately after finishing first of their group in Preferente.

=== Club background ===
- Club de Fútbol Recambios Colón Valencia – (2003–2017)
- Club de Fútbol Recambios Colón Catarroja – (2017–present)

== Season to season ==
Season	Tier	Division	Place	Copa del Rey
2003–04	7	2ª Reg.	2nd	
2004–05	7	2ª Reg.	2nd	
2005–06	6	1ª Reg.	4th	
2006–07	6	1ª Reg.	5th	
2007–08	6	1ª Reg.	4th	
2008–09	6	1ª Reg.	2nd	
2009–10	5	Reg. Pref.	8th	
2010–11	5	Reg. Pref.	14th	
2011–12	5	Reg. Pref.	10th	
2012–13	5	Reg. Pref.	8th	
2013–14	5	Reg. Pref.	4th	
2014–15	5	Reg. Pref.	2nd	
2015–16	4	3ª	16th	
2016–17	4	3ª	14th	
2017–18	4	3ª	21st	
2018–19	5	Reg. Pref.	1st	
2019–20	4	3ª	8th	
2020–21	4	3ª	6th / 4th	
2021–22	5	3ª RFEF	17th	
2022–23	6	Reg. Pref.	3rd	

Season	Tier	Division	Place	Copa del Rey
2023–24	6	Lliga Com.	6th	
2024–25	6	Lliga Com.	3rd	
2025–26	5	3ª Fed.	18th	
2026–27	6	Lliga Com.		

- 5 seasons in Tercera División
- 2 season in Tercera División RFEF

== Stadium ==
After playing in Catarroja in the club's beginnings, Recambios Colón played at the Estadio Polideportivo Municipal de Sedaví in Sedaví (with a capacity of 1,000 people), until 2017, when they moved to the Complex Poliesportiu El Perdiguer (with the same capacity) in Aldaia.
