= Una luz tímida =

Spanish musical

- Book: África Alonso
- Setting: Barcelona, Francoist Spain
- Premiere: 2020: Barcelona, Spain

Una luz tímida is a Spanish musical created by África Alonso and directed by Marilia Samper. The story takes place in Francoist Spain, in Barcelona. Inspired by real events, it follows the love story of two female teachers through the 1960s and 70s, the problems they encounter, and the history of lesbians in Spain.

== Synopsis ==
In 1959, Isabel is a young history reacher who works in a school in Barcelona. She falls in love with Carmen, one of the school's literature teachers. Although Carmen is at first wary, the two enter into a relationship.

Carmen's family, who are very conservative, don't accept her relationship with a woman, and, after trying to separate them and failing to do so, admit Carmen to a psychiatric hospital to be cured of her homosexuality. There, Carmen undergoes electroconvulsive therapy.

Some time later, Carmen leaves the hospital and returns home with Isabel, leaving her family and work behind. Upon returning, she must fight the effects of the therapy, but Isabel does not leave her side and cares for her as best she can.

== Productions ==
The musical premiered in Barcelona in 2020. The production used code-switching - the characters spoke Castilian in public scene and Catalan in private - to further illustrate the socio-political tensions of the day. The only musicians were Andrea Puig Doria on guitar (who also acted as the musical director) and Marta Pons on the cello. Multiple members of the La Cicatriz theater company designed the set, Esther Porcel and Víctor Cárdenas provided lighting, Nuño Vázquez managed the sound design, and Nuria Llunell provided costuming. Jordi Torras and Daria Nicolau produced.

It has since played in Madrid and Valencia.

== Cast ==
	2020 Barcelona
Isabel	África Alonso
Carmen	Julia Jové

== Songs ==
N.	Title	Performer	Duration
1	Todas las historias comienzan con una luz tímida.	África Alonso	0:45
2	Ciutat pintada	África Alonso	2:14
3	Me gustaría que no te fueras. . .	Julia Jové, África Alonso	0:33
4	Si tu hi ets	Julia Jové, África Alonso	4:08
5	Pessigolles	Julia Jové, África Alonso	3:17
6	Jo tindria fills amb tu…	Julia Jové, África Alonso	0:23
7	Com ningú ho ha vist mai	Julia Jové, África Alonso	1:47
8	Totes les parets escolten	Instrumental	1:18
9	Al oído	África Alonso, Júlia Jové	4:26
10	L’ombra	África Alonso	2:20
11	Todas las historias nos recuerdan que nuestro pasado existe	África Alonso	1:07
12	Delirio	Julia Jové, África Alonso	1:24
13	Pez dorado	Julia Jové, África Alonso	2:50
14	Reprise Si tu hi ets	Julia Jové, África Alonso	2:08
15	Soledad sonora	Julia Jové, África Alonso	4:18
16	Reprise Si tú estás 2	África Alonso	1:24
17	Jo seré feliç també	Julia Jové, África Alonso	2:47
18	Reprise Soledad sonora	Julia Jové, África Alonso	2:50
19	Donde te has perdido	África Alonso	3:22

== Awards ==
- IV Premio Teatro Barcelona for Best Musical (2020-2021 season).

== Historical inspiration ==
The musical was inspired by a real couple. Isabel and Carmen crossed paths in a school situated in Castilla-La Mancha, where they worked as truchera. Both had difficult childhoods. Isabel was sexually abused by a family member, and Carmen lived with strong family pressure due to her sexual orientation.

Due to their relationship, Carmen's family pursued conversion therapy for their daughter. She was admitted to the San Onofre psychiatric hospital and subjected to electroconvulsive therapy. Carmen developed a dependency on psychiatric help and on her partner, Isabel, until the end of her life. The couple moved to Catarroja, near Valencia, where Carmen's mental health worsened.

After multiple years in this condition, Carmen asked Isabel to kill her, which she did on May 29, 1998. Immediately afterwards Isabel attempted suicide, but survived and sought medical attention, leading to her killing of Carmen being discovered. The Provincial Court of Valencia sentenced her to three years and six months in prison for assisting a suicide.
