= Lomoviejo =

Coordinates: 41°15′N 5°32′W

Lomoviejo, Spain
- Flag Coat of arms

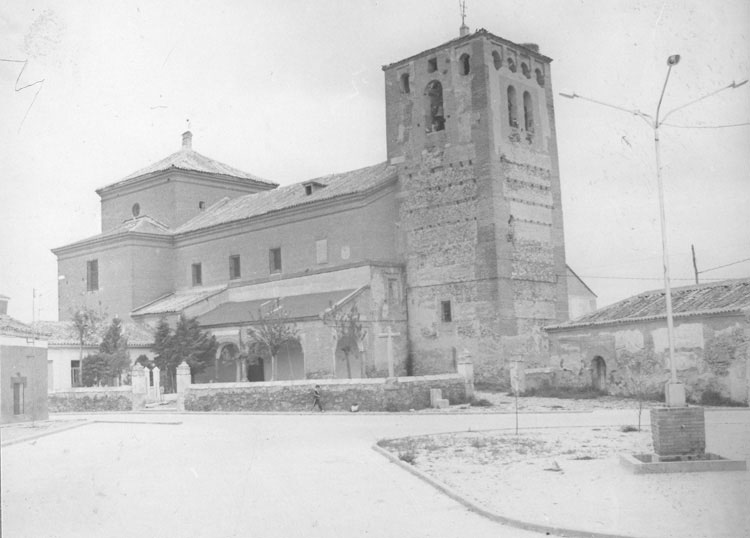
- Church of Nuestra Señora de la Asunción
- Country: Spain
- Autonomous community: Castile and León
- Province: Valladolid
- Municipality: Lomoviejo

Area
  - Total: 27 km^{2} (10 sq mi)

Population (2025-01-01)
  - Total: 155
  - Density: 5.7/km^{2} (15/sq mi)
- Time zone: UTC+1 (CET)
  - Summer (DST): UTC+2 (CEST)

Lomoviejo is a municipality located in the province of Valladolid, Castile and León, Spain. According to the 2004 census (INE), the municipality has a population of 240 inhabitants.
