= Llocnou de la Corona =

- Municipality
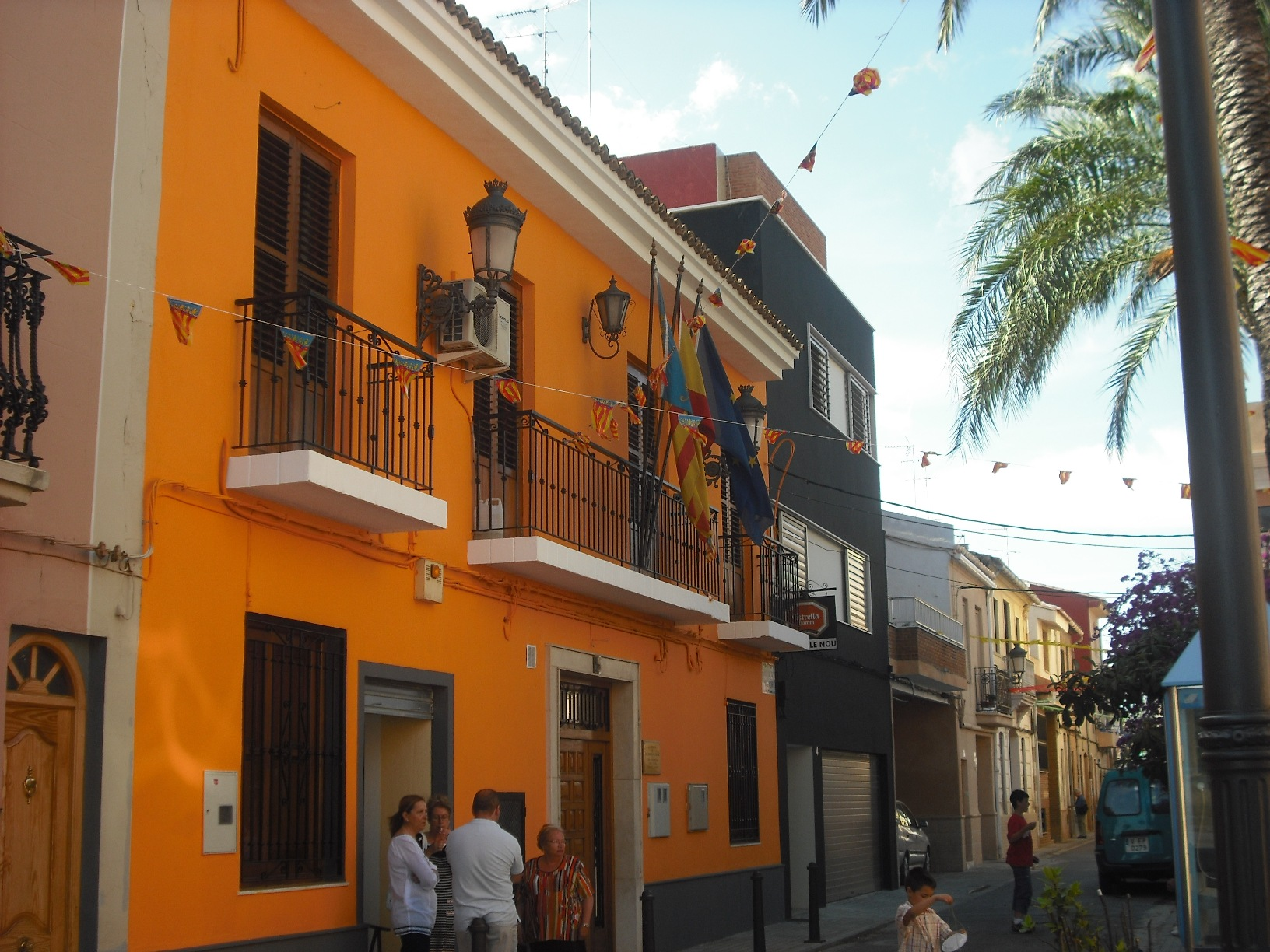
- Town Hall.

- Coat of arms
- Interactive map of Llocnou de la Corona
- Coordinates: 39°25′14″N 0°22′55″W
- Country: Spain
- Autonomous community: Valencian Community
- Province: Valencia
- Comarca: Horta Sud
- Judicial district: Catarroja
- Founded: 1676

Government
  - Mayor: Manuel Gimeno Ruiz

Area
  - Total: 0.0128 km^{2} (0.0049 sq mi)
- Elevation: 12 m (39 ft)

Population (2025-01-01)
  - Total: 132
  - Density: 10,300/km^{2} (26,700/sq mi)
- Demonym: Llocnoví
- Time zone: UTC+1 (CET)
  - Summer (DST): UTC+2 (CEST)
- Postal code: 46910
- Official language(s): Valencian
- Website: Official website

Llocnou de la Corona (Valencian pronunciation: [ˌʎɔɡˈnɔw ðe la koˈɾona]; Spanish: Lugar Nuevo de la Corona) is a municipality in the comarca of Horta Sud in the Valencian Community, Spain. It is the smallest municipality in Spain, covering 0.0128 km^{2} (0.0049 sq mi). As of 2010, it had 130 inhabitants.

== See also ==
- List of municipalities in Valencia
