= Matilla de los Caños =

Matilla de los Caños, Spain
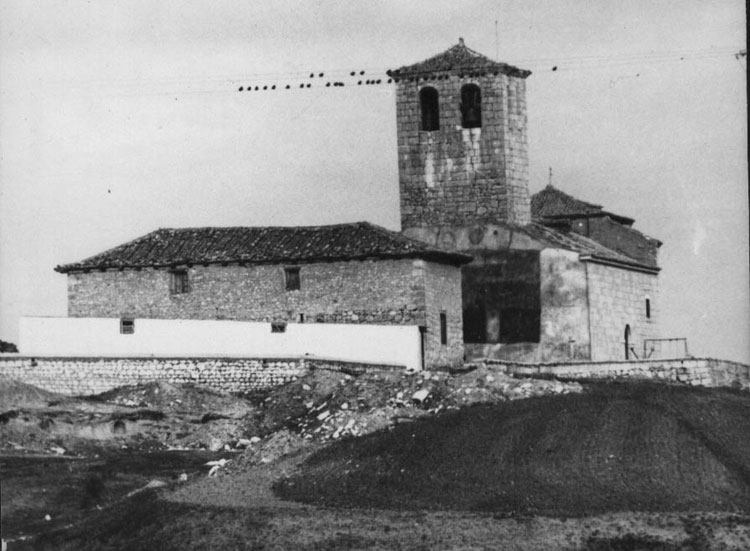
- Church of the town
- Coordinates: 41.5500°N 4.9666°W
- Country: Spain
- Autonomous community: Castile and León
- Province: Valladolid
- Municipality: Matilla de los Caños

Area
  - Total: 12 km^{2} (4.6 sq mi)

Population (2025-01-01)
  - Total: 116
  - Density: 9.7/km^{2} (25/sq mi)
- Time zone: UTC+1 (CET)
  - Summer (DST): UTC+2 (CEST)

Matilla de los Caños is a municipality located in the province of Valladolid, Castile and León, Spain. According to the 2004 census (INE), the municipality has a population of 111 inhabitants.
