= Benetússer =

- Municipality
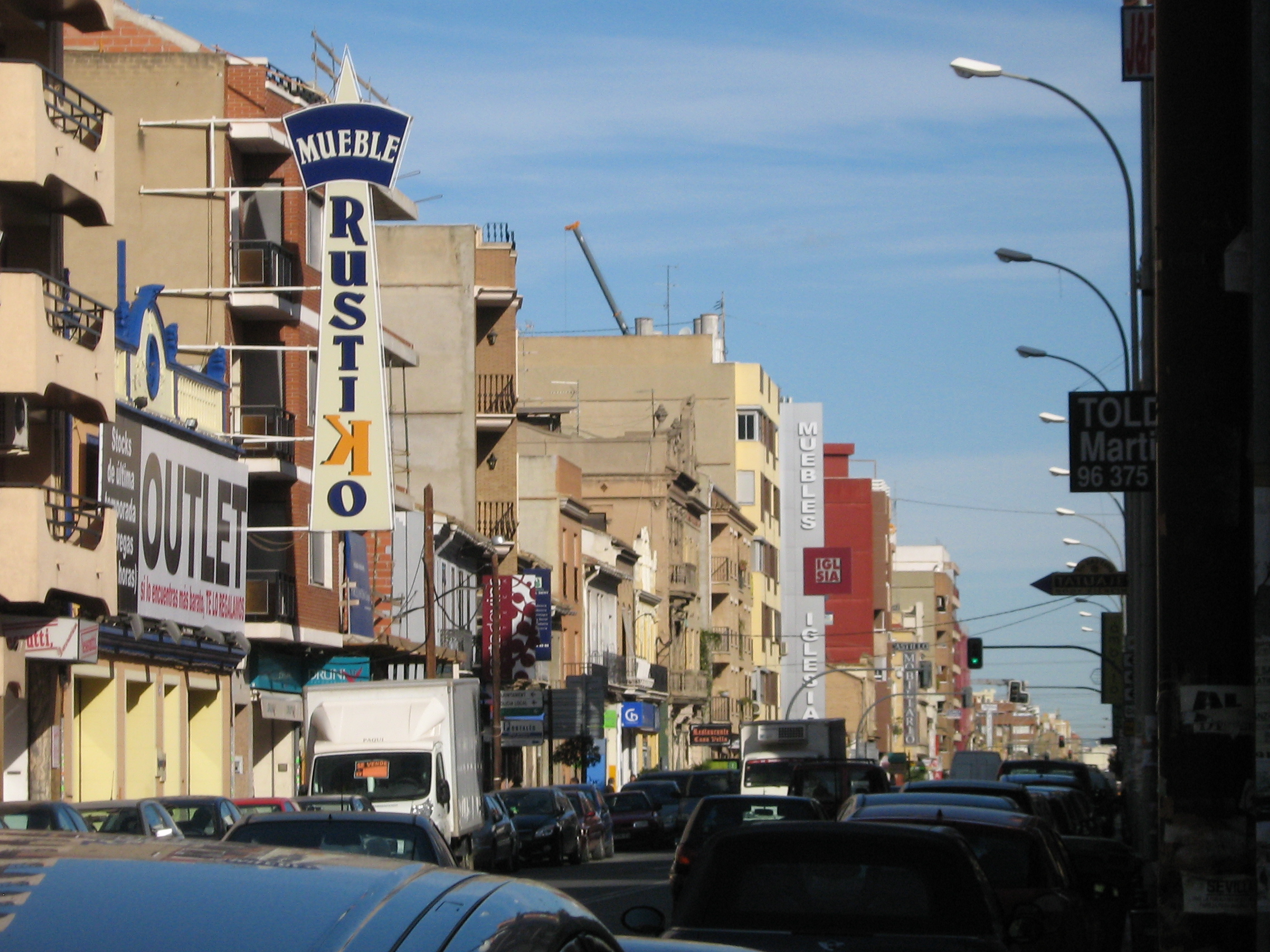

- Flag Coat of arms

- Location in Spain
- Coordinates: 39°25′30″N 0°23′46″W
- Country: Spain
- Autonomous community: Valencian Community
- Province: Valencia
- Comarca: Horta Sud
- Judicial district: Catarroja

Government
  - Alcalde: Sergio Pastor (2007) (PSPV/PSOE)

Area
  - Total: 0.76 km^{2} (0.29 sq mi)
- Elevation: 11 m (36 ft)

Population (2025-01-01)
  - Total: 16,734
  - Density: 22,000/km^{2} (57,000/sq mi)
- Demonym(s): Benetussí, benetussina
- Time zone: UTC+1 (CET)
  - Summer (DST): UTC+2 (CEST)
- Postal code: 46910
- Official language(s): Valencian
- Website: Official website

Benetússer (Valencian: [beneˈtuseɾ]; Spanish: Benetúser) is a municipality in the comarca of Horta Sud in the Valencian Community, Spain. At the 2001 census the municipality had a population of 13,425 inhabitants and a land area of only 0.78 km^{2} (0.301 sq mi). Its population density of 17,211.5 persons/km^{2} was the third highest in Spain (after Mislata and L'Hospitalet de Llobregat).

Benetússer was badly affected by the October 2024 floods.

== See also ==
- List of municipalities in Valencia
