= Puebla de Don Rodrigo =

Coordinates: 39°05′N 4°37′W

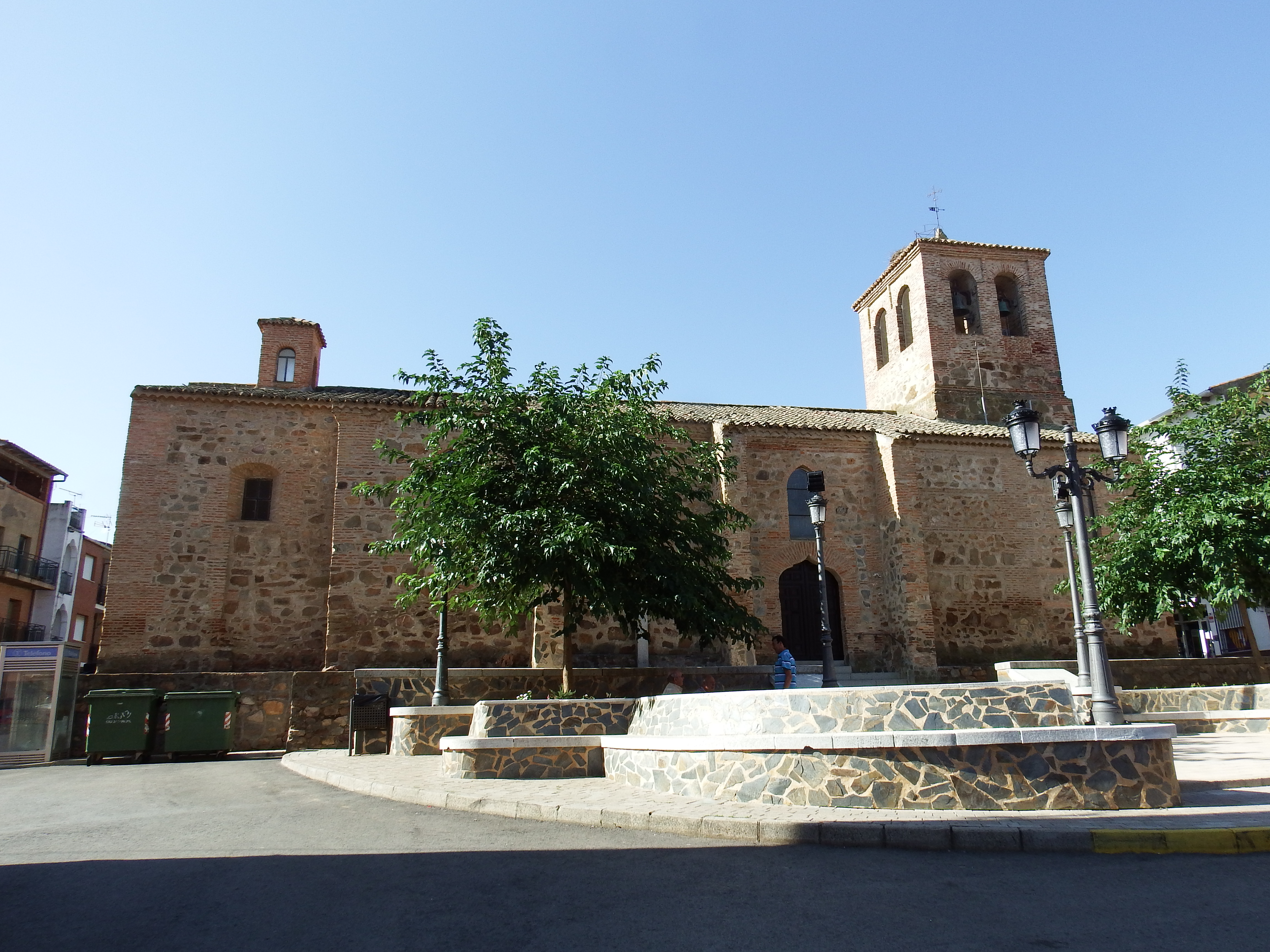
Puebla de Don Rodrigo Main Square

Flag of Puebla de Don Rodrigo

Coat of arms of Puebla de Don Rodrigo

Puebla de Don Rodrigo is a municipality in Ciudad Real, Castile-La Mancha, Spain. It has a population of 1,327.
