= List of municipalities in Castile and León =

Municipalities in the Castile and León

The following list is of important municipalities in the Castile and León, an autonomous community of Spain:

== Provincial lists ==
The following links are to lists which are more detailed province-specific, and all municipalities in a given province are ranked by population.

- List of municipalities in Ávila
- List of municipalities in Burgos
- List of municipalities in León
- List of municipalities in Palencia
- List of municipalities in Salamanca
- List of municipalities in Soria
- List of municipalities in Valladolid
- List of municipalities in Zamora

== Largest municipalities by population ==
Rank	Name	Population (2024)
1	Valladolid	300,618
2	Burgos	175,895
3	Salamanca	144,436
4	León	122,243
5	Palencia	76,738
6	Ponferrada	62,994
7	Zamora	59,506
8	Ávila	58,111
9	Segovia	51,525
10	Soria	40,750
11	Miranda de Ebro	36,018
12	Aranda de Duero	33,757
13	San Andrés del Rabanedo	29,884
14	Laguna de Duero	22,907
15	Arroyo de la Encomienda	22,268
16	Medina del Campo	20,097
17	Villaquilambre	18,647
18	Benavente	17,246
19	Santa Marta de Tormes	14,726
20	Béjar	11,957
21	Ciudad Rodrigo	11,846
22	Astorga	10,308
22	El Espinar	10,145
23	La Bañeza	10,023
24	Cuéllar	9,530
25	Cistérniga	9,281
26	Tudela de Duero	8,786
27	Tordesillas	8,638
28	Toro	8,369
30	Bembibre	8,158

== See also ==
- Comarcas of Castile and León
