= Sedaví =

- Municipality
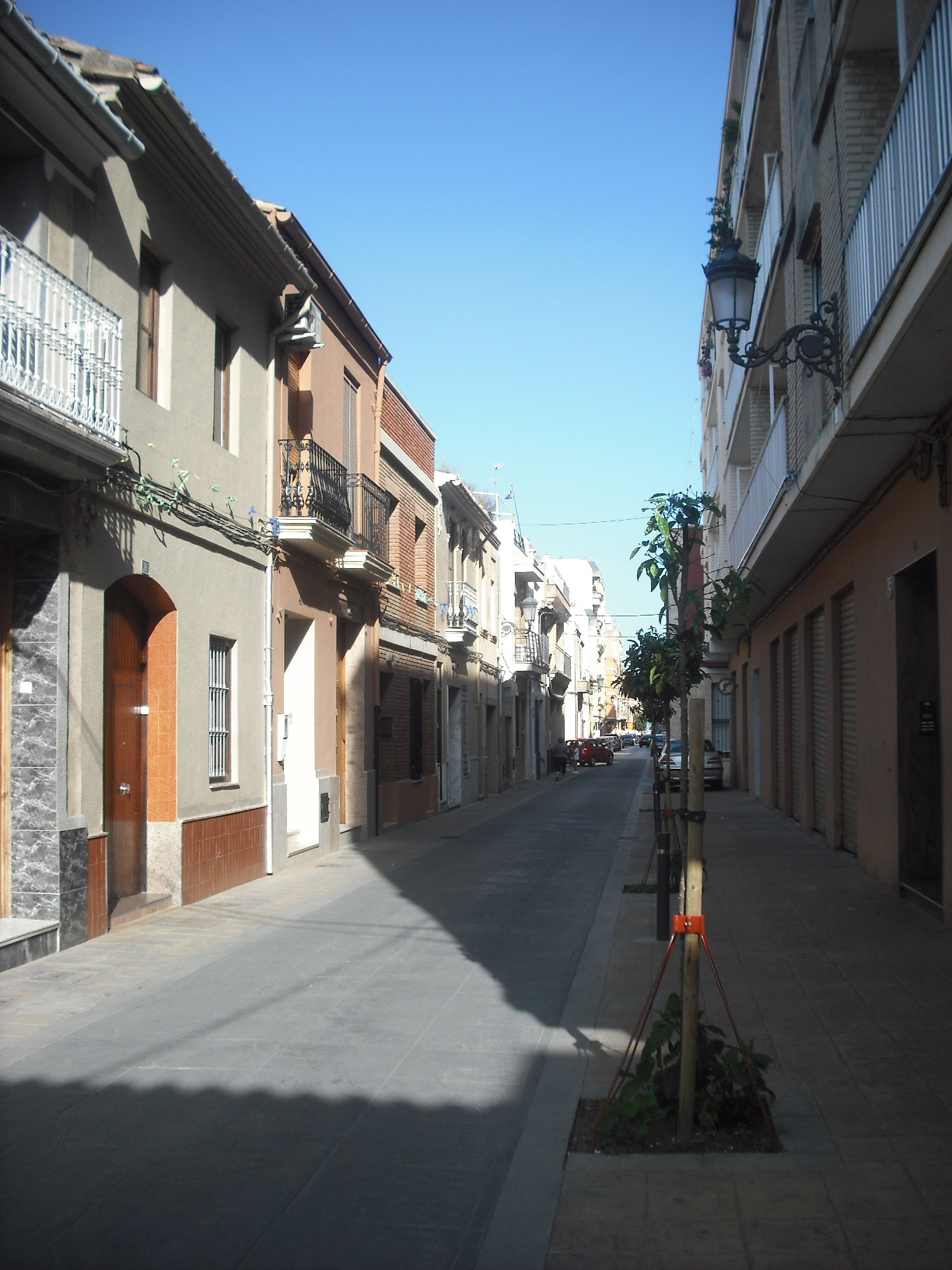

- Coat of arms

- Location in Spain
- Coordinates: 39°25′30″N 0°23′6″W
- Country: Spain
- Autonomous community: Valencian Community
- Province: Valencia
- Comarca: Horta Sud
- Judicial district: Catarroja

Government
  - Alcalde: Ferran Baixauli Chornet (Compromís)

Area
  - Total: 1.8 km^{2} (0.69 sq mi)
- Elevation: 1 m (3.3 ft)

Population (2025-01-01)
  - Total: 10,837
  - Density: 6,000/km^{2} (16,000/sq mi)
- Demonym(s): Sedavienc, sedavienca
- Time zone: UTC+1 (CET)
  - Summer (DST): UTC+2 (CEST)
- Postal code: 46910
- Official language(s): Valencian
- Website: Official website

Sedaví is a municipality in the province of Valencia in the Valencian Community, Spain. It belongs to the comarca of Horta Sud.

== See also ==
- List of municipalities in Valencia
