= Ejido (disambiguation) =

An ejido is a portion of communal land.

Ejido or El Ejido may also refer to:

- Ejido, Venezuela, a town in the state of Mérida, Venezuela
- El Ejido, a town and municipality of Spain in Almería province
- El Ejido (Málaga), a neighbourhood of Málaga, Spain
- El Ejido (León), a neighbourhood of León, Spain
- El Ejido, Los Santos, a district in Los Santos Province, Panama
- El Ejido metro station, a station of the Quito Metro in Ecuador
- El Ejido, la loi du profit, a 2006 Belgian documentary
