= Saint José =

Saint José is an alternative term for Saint Joseph.

Saint José or Saint Jose may also refer to:

- José Gregorio Hernández (1864–1919), Venezuelan Catholic saint and physician
- José Sánchez del Río (1913–1928), Mexican Catholic saint and martyr
- Jose Maria Diaz Sanjuro of the Vietnamese Martyrs
- Joseph Vaz (1651–1711), Catholic saint and Oratorian priest, also known as José Vaz
- Joseph of Anchieta (1534–1597), Spanish Jesuit saint and missionary, who was born José de Anchieta y Díaz de Clavijo
- José María Rubio (1864–1929), Spanish Jesuit saint
- José Gabriel del Rosario Brochero (1840–1914), Argentinian saint
- José María de Yermo y Parres (1851–1904), Mexican Roman Catholic saint and priest

== See also ==
- Saint Joseph (disambiguation)
