= Castillo de Santa Ana =

Fort in Andalusia, Spain

Coordinates: 36°45′14″N 2°36′22″W

- Roquetas de Mar, Almería; Near Aguadulce in Spain
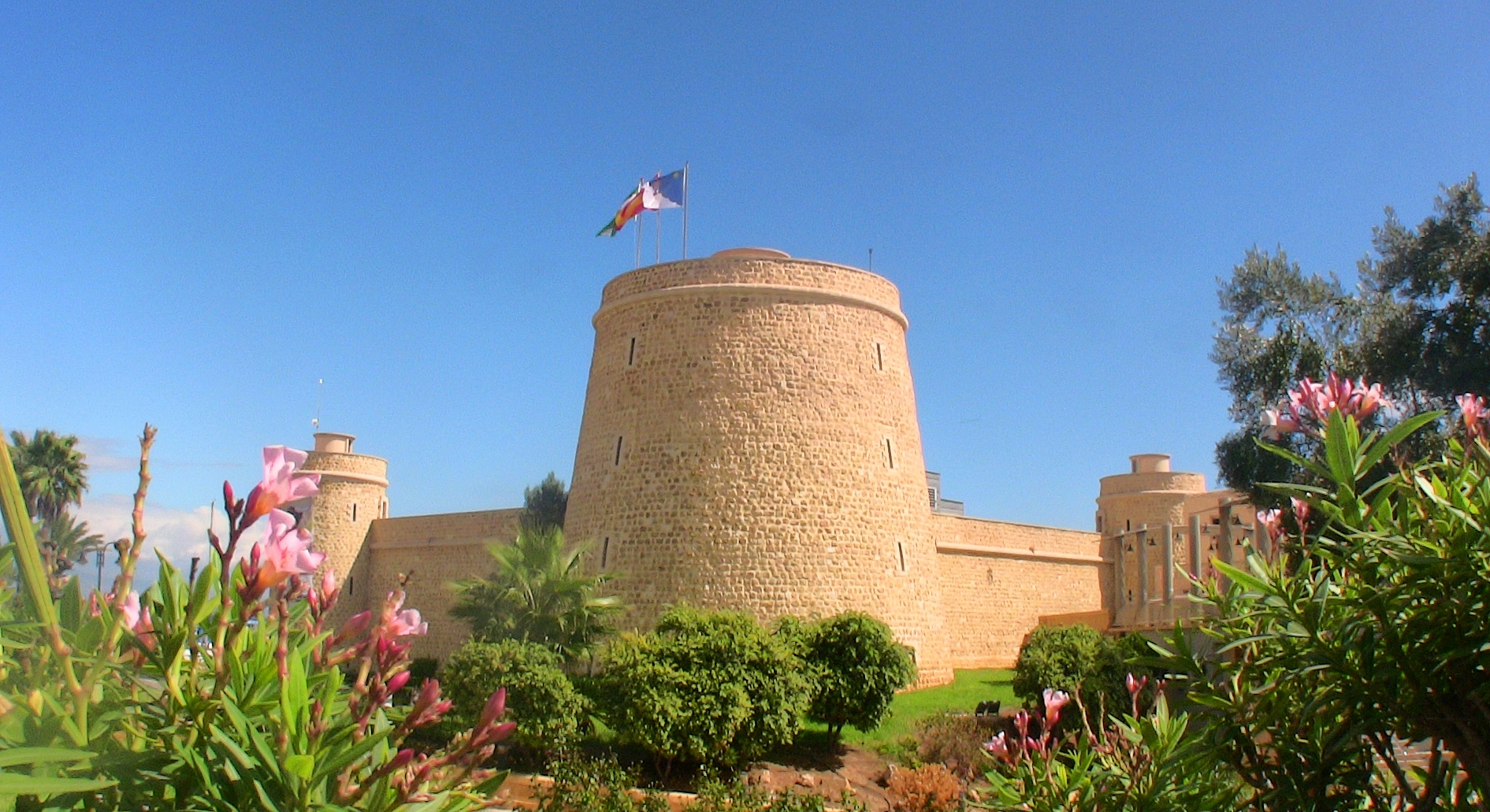

Site information
- Type: Castle

The Castillo de Santa Ana (formerly known as Castillo de Las Roquetas) is a fortification built between the 16th and 17th centuries, located in the town of Roquetas de Mar (Almería) which was used as a refuge for the inhabitants who lived near the port. It has an oblong shape. Near the castle there is a lighthouse.

The 1804 Almería earthquake destroyed most of the structure, leaving only one of the towers and the raised level area, which have since been conserved and recovered.

Nowadays, the castle offers photography and art exhibitions, and acts as a venue for concerts and speeches. On 23 January 2014, the Ayuntamiento de Almería offered a tribute to the poet Julio Alfredo Egea, with the participation of writers like Pilar Quirosa, and texts about the politicians José Antonio Santano and Miguel Ángel Blanco.

== Bibliography ==
- Alcocer Martínez, Mariano (2005). Castillos y fortalezas del antiguo reino de Granada (in Spanish). Editorial MAXTOR. p. 241. ISBN 9788497612036.
