= El Ejido =

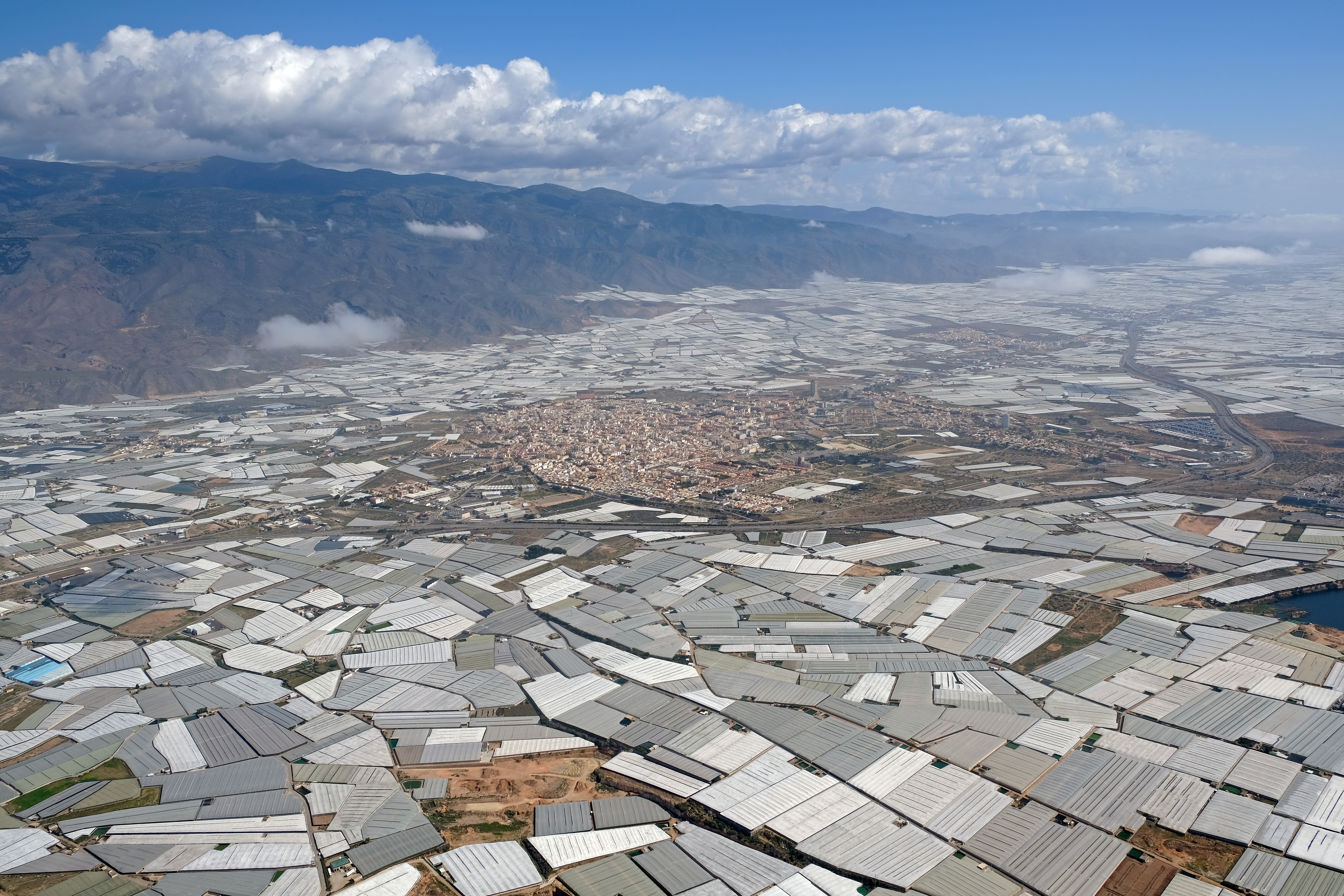

- Flag Coat of arms

- Location of El Ejido El Ejido (Andalusia) El Ejido (Spain)
- Coordinates: 36°46′59″N 2°49′00″W
- Country: Spain
- Community: Andalusia
- Province: Almería
- Comarca: Poniente Almeriense

Government
  - Mayor: Francisco Góngora Cara (PPA) (2015–2019)

Area
  - Total: 227 km^{2} (88 sq mi)
- Elevation: 80 m (260 ft)

Population (2025-01-01)
  - Total: 91,440
  - Density: 403/km^{2} (1,040/sq mi)
- Demonym: Ejidense
- Time zone: UTC+1 (CET)
  - Summer (DST): UTC+2 (CEST)
- Website: elejido.org

El Ejido (Spanish pronunciation: [el eˈxiðo]) is a municipality of Almería province, in the autonomous community of Andalusia, Spain. It is located 32 km from Almería with a surface area of 227 km^{2}, and as reported in 2014 had 84,144 inhabitants. El Ejido is the centre of production for fruit and vegetables in the "Comarca de El Poniente". The work opportunities the city provides attract many foreign farmhands, who look for jobs mainly in the greenhouses there. Some greenhouses have begun using computer-controlled hydroponics systems, thus saving on labour, improving efficiency and the local economy.

In close proximity to the city along the coast line is situated Almerimar, a popular destination for tourism and relaxation.

== 2000 riots ==
In February 2000, the town was the site of three days of anti-immigrant riots after two local men and one woman were killed by two separate Moroccans.

== History ==
The oldest finds have been located at the Ciavieja site and date back to the Copper Age. Evidence of settlement has been located from the Bronze Age to Roman Hispania, a period from which the civitas stipendiaria of Murgi dates.

During the Middle Ages it belonged to the Taha de Dalías. The flat land was a grazing place for the nomadic sheep and goats of the Alpujarras of Almería. The cisterns, troughs and irrigation ditches from the Celín stream date back to the 13th and 14th centuries, often taking advantage of previous infrastructure. After the Granada War, only herds within the jurisdiction of the city of Granada were authorized to graze in Campo de Dalías.

In the 16th century, after the expulsion of the Moors, the Alpujarras were a special repopulation area and were under strict control. The threat of the Turkish and Berber pirates, the depopulation and the scarce resources available to the Balerma tower and the Roquetas castle, as well as the disarmament of the population, mean that this area will not be satisfactorily repopulated.

In the mid-18th century, Dalías was a royal place and this center did concentrate population because it was an agricultural and livestock bureaucratic center. However, the current El Ejido in Campo de Dalías was mainly made up of the current population and farmhouses dedicated to subsistence agriculture and grazing.

=== Contemporary age ===
In 1953 the National Institute of Colonization approved the General Colonization Plan of Campo de Dalías and developed San Agustín and Las Norias de Daza, where the settlers arrived in 1956. As a consequence, in the middle of the 20th century El Ejido had slightly more than 3000 inhabitants.

Successful trials are carried out to obtain improvements in agricultural productivity by combining sanding for greenhouse cultivation. Starting in 1961, greenhouse sanding and innovations such as the drip irrigation system, were generally implemented. The Ejido becomes the greatest exponent of intensive agriculture in the province of Almería and the primary sector becomes a generator of prosperity and employment. It was the time of the Spanish economic miracle (1959-1973).

In 1981, the capital of the municipality of Dalías was transferred to El Ejido. In 1982 the towns of Dalías and Celín were segregated to become an independent municipality (Royal Decree 2251/1982 of June 30).

Currently, the greenhouse area of El Ejido and the rest of Poniente Almeria is known as La Huerta de Europa (The Garden of Europe) and El Mar de Plastico (The Sea of Plastic). This last name is due to the fact that NASA observed that the large expanse of greenhouses is perfectly visible from space.

In February 2000, the murders of two farmers and a young woman in just over a week at the hands of immigrants provoked a majority protest throughout the Poniente Almeriense region, although the media focused their attention on El Ejido (they were known as the Events of El Ejido). Barricades were indeed erected from Adra to Roquetas de Mar, and there were protests in all the towns of the Poniente, without distinction of the political color of the municipal government. There were injuries and material destruction in the substandard housing and establishments of the immigrants.

In October 2009, Mayor Juan Antonio Enciso Ruiz of the Almería Party was imprisoned along with twenty members accused of charges such as embezzlement of public funds, falsification of documents and bribery, in the so-called Operation Poniente. In the summer of 2010, he was released after posting bail of 300,000 euros.

== Climate ==
El Ejido has a hot semi-desert climate (Köppen: BSh). Winters are mild, sometimes very mild, and temperatures above 20 °C (68 °F) during the winter are common, while low temperatures rarely drop below 5 °C (41 °F). Summers are hot and high temperatures frequently exceed 32 °C (90 °F), while the nights remain, on average, at 22 °C (72 °F), which makes tropical nights very common. Precipitation is scarce throughout the year and it is one of the driest cities in Spain and Europe. The city has also recorded the lowest annual precipitation ever registered in Spain, with only 27.3 millimetres (1.07 in) in 2023. El Ejido is located in one of the few areas of mainland Spain where the average annual temperature exceeds 20 °C (68 °F), which is one of the hottest areas annually in the Iberian Peninsula.

Climate data for El Ejido (2004-2025), extremes (2003-present)
Month	Jan	Feb	Mar	Apr	May	Jun	Jul	Aug	Sep	Oct	Nov	Dec	Year
Record high °C (°F)	26.7 (80.1)	27.8 (82.0)	31.9 (89.4)	32.7 (90.9)	36.1 (97.0)	40.4 (104.7)	39.4 (102.9)	40.7 (105.3)	40.3 (104.5)	32.9 (91.2)	30.5 (86.9)	27.2 (81.0)	40.7 (105.3)
Mean daily maximum °C (°F)	18.5 (65.3)	18.8 (65.8)	20.4 (68.7)	22.7 (72.9)	25.9 (78.6)	29.8 (85.6)	32.4 (90.3)	32.7 (90.9)	29.7 (85.5)	26.3 (79.3)	21.9 (71.4)	19.4 (66.9)	24.9 (76.8)
Daily mean °C (°F)	13.9 (57.0)	14.3 (57.7)	15.8 (60.4)	18.0 (64.4)	21.0 (69.8)	24.7 (76.5)	27.3 (81.1)	27.8 (82.0)	25.0 (77.0)	21.7 (71.1)	17.4 (63.3)	14.9 (58.8)	20.2 (68.3)
Mean daily minimum °C (°F)	9.2 (48.6)	9.8 (49.6)	11.2 (52.2)	13.3 (55.9)	16.0 (60.8)	19.5 (67.1)	22.2 (72.0)	22.9 (73.2)	20.4 (68.7)	17.0 (62.6)	12.8 (55.0)	10.4 (50.7)	15.4 (59.7)
Record low °C (°F)	−1.2 (29.8)	2.7 (36.9)	4.2 (39.6)	8.2 (46.8)	9.4 (48.9)	14.2 (57.6)	16.2 (61.2)	15.9 (60.6)	14.2 (57.6)	9.5 (49.1)	6.7 (44.1)	5.1 (41.2)	−1.2 (29.8)
Average precipitation mm (inches)	23.3 (0.92)	23.7 (0.93)	33.7 (1.33)	21.6 (0.85)	13.5 (0.53)	3.2 (0.13)	0.5 (0.02)	3.9 (0.15)	13.4 (0.53)	24.8 (0.98)	32.5 (1.28)	38.8 (1.53)	232.9 (9.18)
Average precipitation days (≥ 1 mm)	3.0	3.9	4.4	3.7	1.8	0.5	0.1	0.4	1.9	3.7	4.2	3.4	31
Source: Agencia Estatal de Meteorologia AEMET OpenData 6291B (Precipitation days 2004-2020)

== Transport ==
El Ejido is one of the largest Spanish towns without access to the rail network; in 2020 a proposal was submitted to build a railway from Almería to Adra via Roquetas de Mar and El Ejido; with El Ejido mayor Francisco Góngora confirming his support for such a project.

== Demographics ==
Historical population
Year	Pop.	±%
1999	51,485	—
2000	53,008	+3.0%
2001	55,710	+5.1%
2002	57,063	+2.4%
2003	61,265	+7.4%
2004	63,914	+4.3%
2005	68,828	+7.7%
2010	85,389	+24.1%
Source: INE (Spain)

== Sport ==
CD El Ejido 2012 is based in the municipality.

== See also ==
- El Ejido, la loi du profit
- Intensive farming in Almería
- List of municipalities in Almería
