= Aguadulce (Almería) =

- Municipality
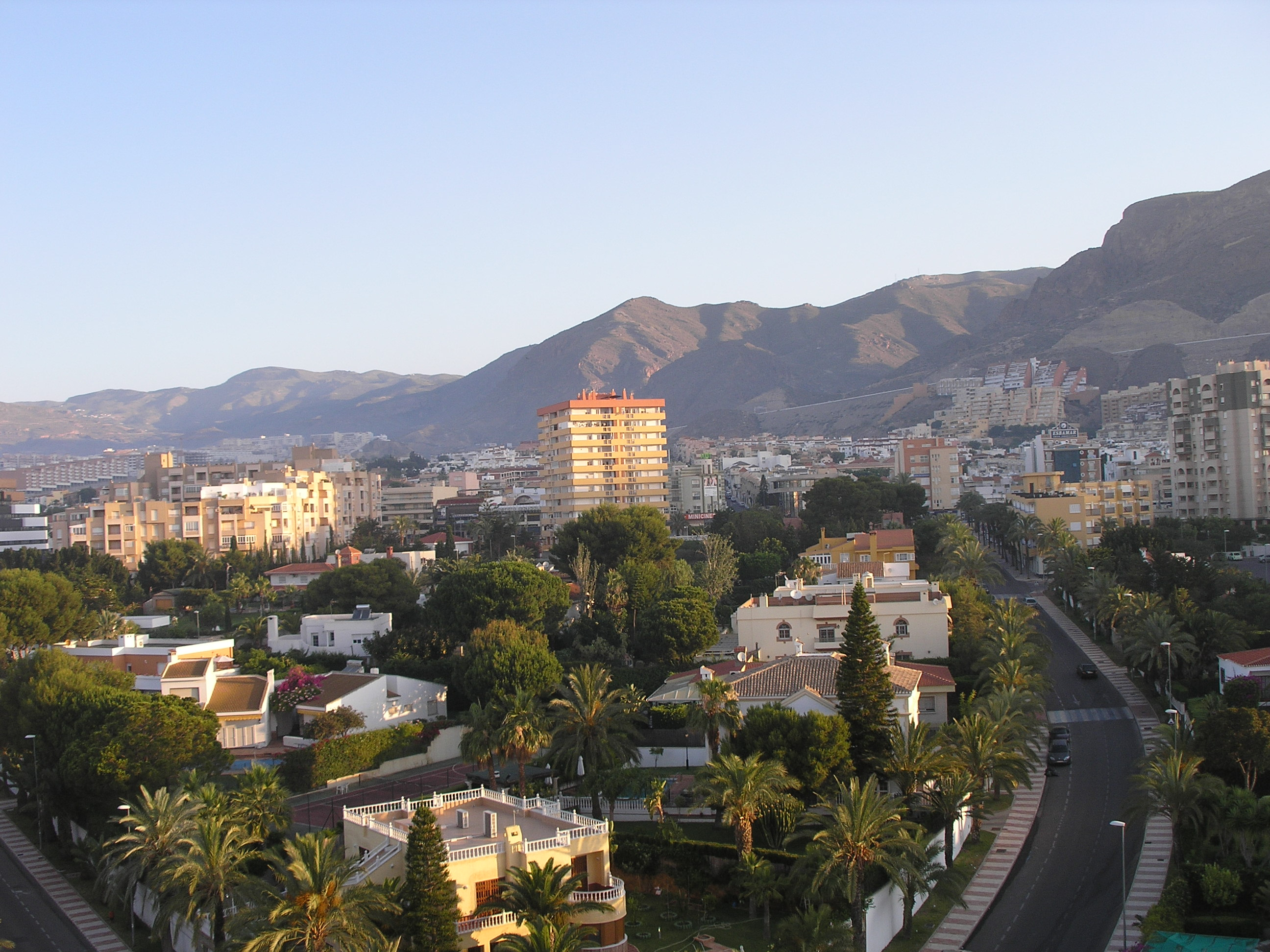

- Location of Aguadulce Aguadulce (Andalusia) Aguadulce (Spain)
- Coordinates: 36°45′51″N 2°36′53″W
- Country: Spain
- Region: Andalusia
- Province: Almería Province
- Comarca: Poniente Almeriense
- Municipality: Roquetas de Mar
- Elevation: 2 m (6.6 ft)

Population
  - Total: 16,176
- Website: www.aytoroquetas.org

Aguadulce is a Spanish town in the municipality of Roquetas de Mar, province of Almería, in the autonomous community of Andalucía. It is located in the region of Poniente Almeriense, about 14 kilometres from the city of Almería, along the national road (N-340a) and 14 km along the dual carriageway (A-7)

In 2018, it had a population of 16176 inhabitants (INE), although during summer the population triples due to tourism, the main economic engine of the town.

== History ==
The towns of Aguadulce, Las Hortichuelas and Campillo del Moro did not originally belong to the municipality of Roquetas de Mar, but they were added in the first third of the 20th century. The reason was that the Enix Town Council, to which these places belonged, proposed to cede to Roquetas de Mar if this municipality undertook the payment of the debits that Aguadulce had. This decision was communicated to the residents of Aguadulce, no claim was made, and on 24 June 1927 the Roquetas Town Council agreed to add this town with the proposed conditions. In the years 1928 and 1929 the boundaries were made, adding also a part of the municipality of Vícar. However, in 1931 the Town Council of Enix, requested that the land previously ceded be returned, to which Roquetas agreed, but there was a protest from a resident of Aguadulce and in 1932 the Town Council of Roquetas agreed to rescind the decision taken in 1931.

From then on, a series of disputes between the two municipalities followed. In Aguadulce it was not the same as in El Parador de las Hortichuelas, because its census was more significant. There were a few numbers of houses, having a bit more of 200 neighbours. The houses were on each side of the main road, but there were also some other streets perpendicular to this main street, and almost all of them were in direction to the mountain. There were some important houses, if we compare them with those of that time. These road houses, a rudimentary petrol pump, a grocery store and a chapel were the most characteristic of this locality.

During the first third of the 20th century, modern means were incorporated, causing a change in the lifestyles of the population, such as the construction of a new road, means of communication: telephone, telegraph and transport, it took place the installation of the first bus line, and the first public lighting for electricity was hired in 1936 thanks to a workers society called “Desde la Buena Unión”, which in that year requested the change of the street lights. Aguadulce was more populated that El Parador, and although service were scarce, it had two schools and they celebrated their patron celebrations in honor of the Virgen del Carmen.

In the summers, the population increased slightly due to the incipient tourism that began in those times. We must not forget that it was in Aguadulce were the influx of tourists began to arrive. In 1964 Aguadulce was declared the First National Interest Center of Spain. The few holidaymakers who arrived in this town did not stay in luxurious chalets or splendid mansions on the shore of the beach, but in modest houses that they rented or bought in the center of the neighbourhood, making on the shore of the beach a hut to enjoy sunbathing and sea bathing, and that once they finished the holidays they were disarmed until the next year. And so it went from having 27 houses and 300 inhabitants in 1950 to become the headquarters of a stable population that exceeds 15,000 inhabitants and that during the summer months the figure triplies, reaching about 45,000 people.

In April 2019 it was formed Aguadulce en Marcha, led by Francisco Javier García Fernández, in order to solve the town problems and create Aguadulce as "Entidad Local Autónoma".

== Demography ==
=== Population evolution ===
demographic vertical bar chart of between 2000 and 2019

== Transport and communications ==
By road, the Mediterranean Highway (A-7) connects Aguadulce with the rest of the province of Almeria and all Spain. In addition, the N-340a road runs through all the locality and connects it with the city of Almeria and with El Parador de las Hortichuelas, La Puebla de Vícar, La Gangosa and Roquetas de Mar. The nearest airport is 25 km away. As for maritime communications, it has a marina and the commercial port of Almeria is 8 km away. It has no railway connection on its own, although the Almeria railway station is very close by and the buses can be taken at the same railway station connect continuously with Aguadulce.

== Art, monuments and sites of interest ==
The archaeological site of La Ribera de Algaida or Ribera de Turaniana is a set of archaeological remains discovered in 1859 that chronologically cover from the end of the Bronze Age, through the Argaric culture, fundamental during Roman times, to the Muslim period. Is located along the coast. It occupies an area of between 12 and 13 hectares approximately.

La Ribera de la Algaida was declared an Asset of Cultural Interest (BIC) with the category of Archaeological Zone by Decree 174/1991 on 17 September 1991, code 40790004, inscribed as "Archaeological Zone" (BOE number 249, page 33777, 17 October).
