= Roquetas Pidgin Spanish =

Dialect spoken by immigrants in Southern Spain

- Native to: Spain
- Region: Roquetas de Mar, Almería
- Native speakers: None
- Language family: Spanish pidgin

Language codes
- ISO 639-3: None (mis)
- Glottolog: roqu1234

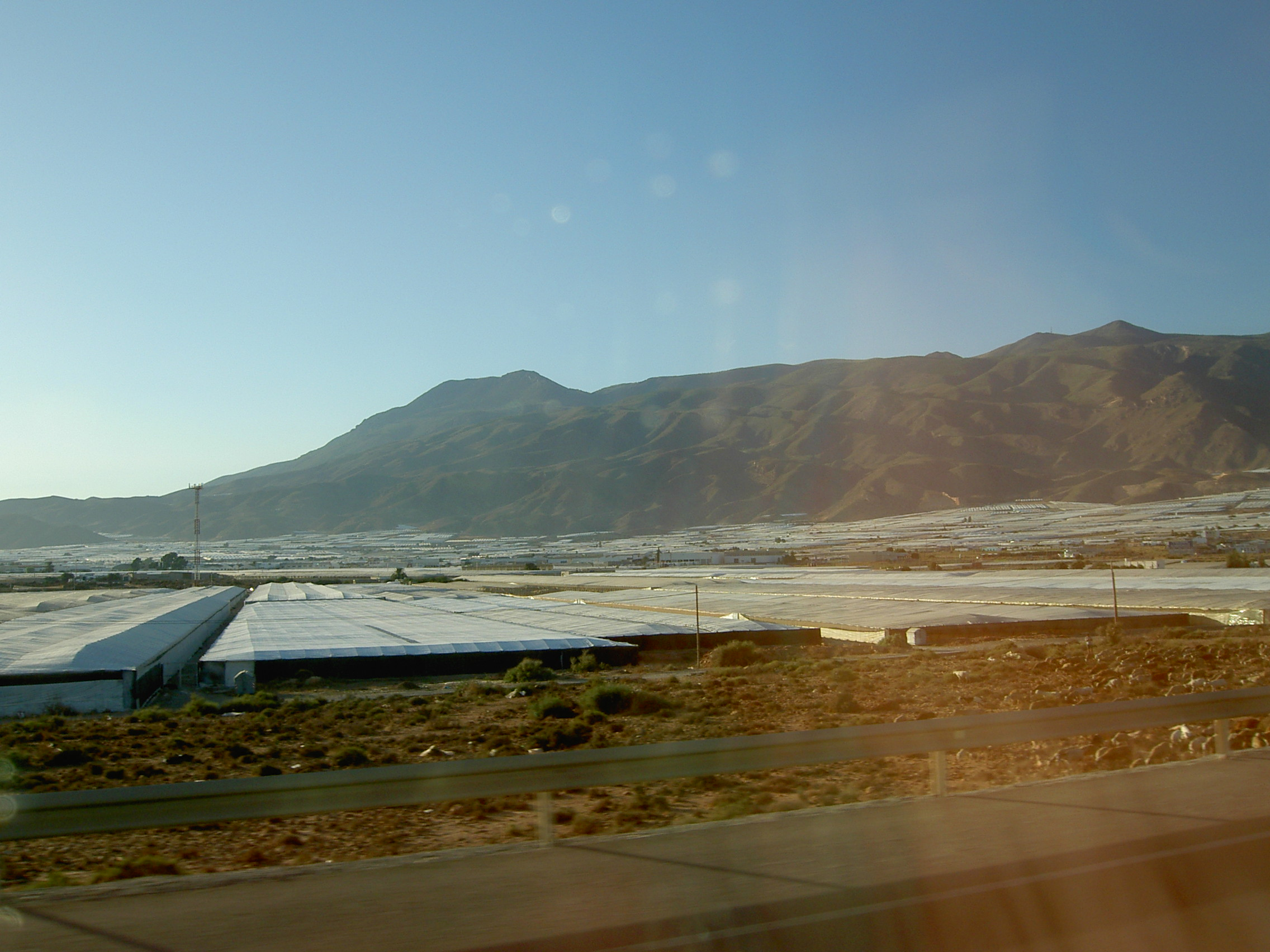
Greenhouses in Roquetas in 2004

Roquetas Pidgin Spanish is a Spanish-based pidgin spoken among agricultural workers in Roquetas de Mar in Spain. Immigrants attracted to work in the greenhouses of the area come from many countries in north and west Africa and eastern Europe, and few speak any Spanish before arrival. The resulting pidgin has such typical characteristics as an avoidance of antonyms.

== Social and geographical situation ==
Roquetas Pidgin is spoken by migrant workers working in the greenhouses in and around Roquetas de Mar, which constitutes Andalusia's largest agglomeration of greenhouses. These workers represent more than 50 different nationalities and live in neighborhoods at the edge of or sometimes even among the greenhouses. Most are undocumented and live in precarious conditions. The majority are single men aged 20–29 who have been living in Spain for less than a year. As a result of these conditions, the migrant community is very marginalized, and suspicious of mingling with other social groups. Most immigrants leave Roquetas after a few months.

Most migrants with very little education come from the Maghreb and the Sahel, where literacy rates seem to be lower. At the same time, many immigrants from Russia, Ukraine, and Romania have completed secondary and sometimes even higher education. The most widely spoken native languages are Sunnike, Bambara, Arabic, and Romanian. Although the migrants are divided by nationality and native language of origin, they maintain relationships marked by a high degree of solidarity familiarity, and there is no internal hierarchy among them. Their common life circumstances make them form a social group within Almería and lead to a homogenous pidgin language.

These immigrants typically have studied no Spanish before arriving in Andalusia, but have been able to adopt it to maintain a minimum of communication with fellow workers, with employers and with native speakers on the bus and in stores. Their speech has a simplified grammar and vocabulary, but this has also resulted in the creation of new structures, such as this variety's spatial deixis. This contact situation, where people from a variety of language backgrounds are in contact and need a common language for certain contexts, is the typical background for a pidgin to form. This common pidgin language is generally restricted to the work environment and to the few other interactions migrants have with native Spanish-speakers.

Roquetas Pidgin Spanish has been studied by Alexander Haselow who worked for three months in the greenhouses with these migrant workers.

== Pronunciation ==
There are some cases of phonemes being replaced by others in Roquetas Pidgin, such as the pronunciation of abajo 'down' or trabajo 'work' with a /k/ instead of an /x/. The general preference is for words with simple and transparent forms. Particular aspects of some words, such as the trilled /r/ in arriba 'up', the palatal nasal in pequeño 'small', the /iθk/ sequence in izquierda 'left', the hiatus in ahí or the palatal fricative in allí, may be a reason for the use of alternate terms.

== Grammar ==
=== Grammatical gender ===
Roquetas Pidgin speakers exhibit a large degree of confusion of grammatical gender. Forms such as el trabaja 'work', instead of Spanish el trabajo, as well as mucha trabajo, are widespread. The word mucho 'a lot' is almost always used in its feminine form mucha when describing nouns.

=== Plural nouns ===
Identifying any possible plural nouns may be difficult in Roquetas Pidgin Spanish due to the influence of local Andalusian Spanish, which tends to reduce syllable-final -/s/. In the local native variety of Roquetas de Mar, the elision of syllable-final -/s/ is compensated by lengthening of the preceding vowel. No such compensatory lengthening is found in Roquetas Pidgin Spanish. In any case, it is clear from the lack of inflection of surrounding elements and especially of the verb that plural nouns are not present in Roquetas Pidgin Spanish. Some example sentences demonstrating this are: Todo habla español 'we all speak Spanish', and, in response to a question about mountains in Mali, Sí, tiene muntaña. Mucho 'Yes, it has mountains. A lot'. The word papeles or 'papers' is unique in that it quite often is used in a plural form.

=== Adjectives ===
Roquetas Pidgin Spanish is noted for having very few qualifying adjectives: bueno 'good', grande 'big', rico 'rich', and rápido 'fast'. Adjectives do not agree in person or in gender with the nouns they describe, and are typically expressed in their masculine form. To intensify an adjective, mucho may be said after it, as in Mi casa no grande mucho 'my house is not very big'.

=== Indefinite pronouns ===
Three indefinite pronouns in particular are widely used in Roquetas Pidgin Spanish: todo 'all', mucho 'a lot', poco 'few'. They are used without gender or number agreement, and they may be reduplicated to express intensification.

=== Verbs ===
Verbs are almost used in their third-person singular present indicative forms. Also, Roquetas Pidgin Spanish is not a pro-drop language. Unlike in native Spanish, subject pronouns like tú 'you' and yo 'I' are rarely dropped. Haselow speculates that the preference for the third-person singular form, rather than the infinitive, could be because the third-person singular forms are a kind of "least common denominator". That is, the third-person singular is the stem of a verb, bearing no inflectional morphemes, and other present indicative forms share all or most of the third-person singular's content. This preference for the third-person singular is also found among many second-language speakers of Spanish in other areas, such as the US, and among transitional bilinguals or semi-speakers of Spanish. It is also found in some current Afro-Hispanic dialect pockets and in attested Bozal Spanish. A categorical use of the third-person singular is found in basilectal forms of the creole spoken by many Afro-Bolivians living in the Yungas.

The verbs comer 'eat' and duchar 'shower' are often used in the infinitive, typically in the expressions para comer 'for eating' and para duchar 'for showering'.

The only reflexive verb is llamarse 'to be called', which is really only said in the set phrase se llama 'is named', as in ¿Cómo se llama? 'What is your name?', or Se llama... 'My name is...', although me llama 'My name is' is also attested.

=== Syntax ===
Roquetas Pidgin Spanish has a strict subject–verb–object word order, which has been speculated to be due to a mental model inherent in the immigrants' brains. The strictness of Roquetas Pidgin's word order may also be due to a greater degree of analyticity compared to Spanish, due to the lack of verb conjugations or noun-adjective agreement. The language's syntax has to compensate for the lack of grammatical information carried by inflectional morphology.

The prepositions a 'to' and de 'of, from' are frequently dropped, as in ¿Tú es dónde? 'Where are you (from)?', Él es Mali 'He is (from)'. The copula ser is also frequently dropped, meaning the zero copula is common in Roquetas Pidgin.

=== Deixis ===
The spatial deixis of Roquetas Pidgin Spanish shows some notable differences from that of standard Spanish. Whereas standard Spanish has three different spatial deictic adverbs, aquí, ahí, and allí, reflecting three degrees of spatial proximity, Roquetas Pidgin uses just two, aquí and así, which reflect the criterion of visibility. That is, aquí is used in reference to locations within the field of view, while así is used in references to places outside the field of view. Proximity plays no role. When standing atop a hill overlooking Roquetas de Mar and asked ¿Dónde está tu casa? 'Where is your house?', one of Haselow (2009)'s respondents replied aquí, which would mean 'here' in standard Spanish.

When giving directions, immigrant workers in Roquetas also use physical gestures such as pointing their finger or glancing towards a certain area. These physical gestures are in many cases the only way for an interlocutor to know what location or direction is being referred to. For example, when asked to give directions to the nearest bus stop, an immigrant worker in Roquetas may say Marcha así y a la derecha 'Go there, to the right', accompanied by a gesture pointing to a certain area.

=== Reduplication ===
In the phrase Llueve, poco poco 'It rains very little' documented by Haselow (2009), the speaker expresses intensification by reduplicating the adverb poco instead of by using the adverb muy 'very'.

== Vocabulary ==
Most migrants in Roquetas have an active Spanish vocabulary of no more than forty different words. The most commonly used nouns have to do with either aspects of work, or with the physical environment and directions. While most verbs are exclusively used only in the third-person present singular form, the verbs comer 'eat' and duchar 'shower' actually are quite often used in the infinitive, especially in the expressions para comer 'for eating' and para duchar 'for showering'. Haselow (2004) only found two interjections in Roquetas Pidgin Spanish, hola and ¡hombre!, and no profanity.

=== Lack of antonyms ===
The speech of the migrant workers in Roquetas generally avoids antonyms, instead preferring simple negations. For example, while abajo 'down' is widely used in Roquetas Pidgin Spanish, its opposite arriba 'up' is almost entirely absent. Instead, speakers of Roquetas Pidgin use no abajo to mean 'up'. Similarly, a la izquierda 'to the left' is replaced by no a la derecha 'not to the right', and pequeño 'small' is replaced by no grande 'not big'. Some other examples are bueno/no bueno 'good/not good' and todos/no todos 'all/not all'. The one case of antonymy found in the lexicon is that of mucho 'a lot' and poco 'a little'.

=== Semantics ===
Given the general paucity of words in Roquetas Pidgin, many terms have had their meanings expanded. The term marchar is used for any human movement. The preference for marchar may be due to its regular conjugation, since most other verbs related to human movement are conjugated irregularly, and Roquetas Pidgin Spanish eliminates all verbal inflection, using verbs only in the present third-person singular form. Similarly, hablar replaces all other verbs related to communication. For example: Yo habla no 'I say no', with a third-person verb form and use of hablar instead of decir 'to say', Yo marcha mañana aquí 'I am coming here tomorrow', with a third-person form and marchar instead of venir 'to come'.
