= Poniente Almeriense =

Administrative area in Andalusia, Spain

Coordinates: 36.78234°N 2.74315°W

- Comarca
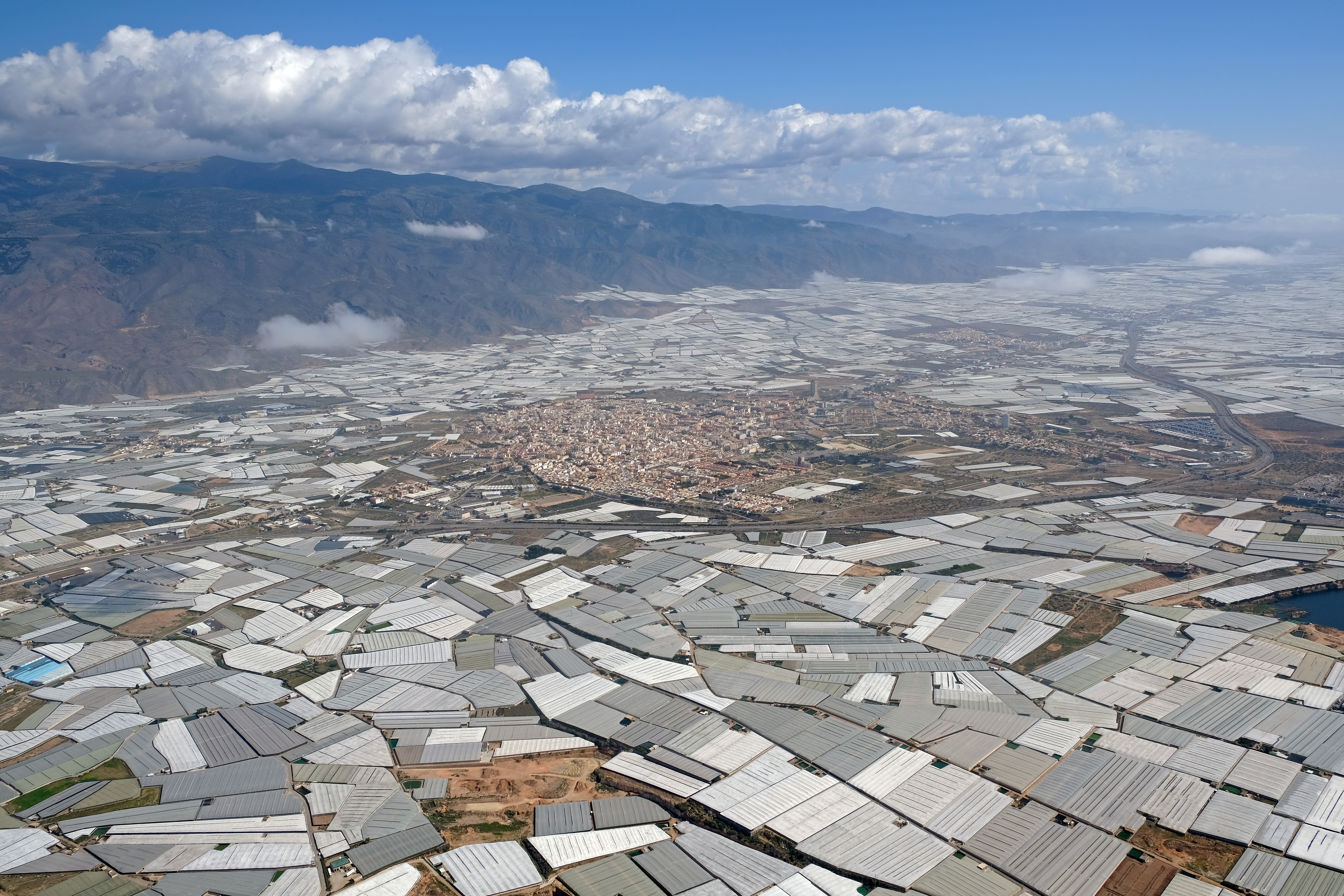
- "Sea of plastic" and the town of El Ejido

- Location of Poniente Almeriense in Andalusia, Spain

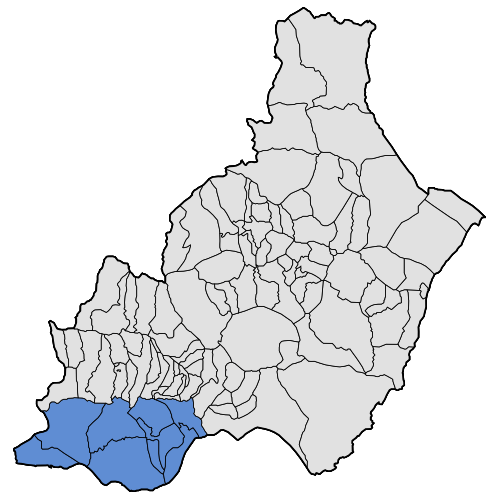
- Location of Poniente Almeriense in the province of Almería
- Country: Spain
- Autonomous community: Andalusia
- Province: Almería
- Municipalities: List: Adra, Balanegra, Berja, Dalías, El Ejido, Enix, Felix, La Mojonera, Roquetas de Mar, Vícar

Area
  - Total: 970 km^{2} (370 sq mi)

Population (2024) (Note: Census of 1 January 2024: National Statistics Institute (Spain))
  - Total: 283,858
  - Density: 290/km^{2} (760/sq mi)
- Time zone: UTC+1 (CET)
  - Summer (DST): UTC+2 (CEST)
- Largest municipality: El Ejido

Poniente Almeriense is one of the seven comarcas in the Spanish province of Almería in Andalusia, established in 2003. It is sometimes known as the "sea of plastic" (Spanish: Mar de plástico), due to the numerous greenhouses that cover the area. The comarca contains ten municipalities, and as of the 2024 census, it had 283,858 inhabitants (Note: Census of 1 January 2024: Instituto Nacional de Estadística, Madrid.) in an area of 970 km^{2} (370 sq mi). The "sea of plastic" was one of the subjects of the 2005 documentary film We Feed the World and the setting of the crime drama television series Mar de plástico.

Typical products of the greenhouses include cucumbers, watermelons, eggplants, zucchinis, melons, peppers, and tomatoes.

The comarca borders the Alboran Sea to the south, the city of Almería to the east, the Sierra de Gádor to the north, and the municipality of Albuñol to the west.

== Municipalities ==
Poniente Almeriense contains the following ten municipalities:

Arms	Municipality	Area (km^{2})	Population (2024) (Note: Census of 1 January 2024: National Statistics Institute (Spain))	Density (/km^{2})
Dalías	Adra	89.62	25,515	284.70
Dalías	Balanegra	31.60	3,016	95.44
Dalías	Berja	185.66	12,939	69.69
Dalías	Dalías	141.32	4,169	29.50
Dalías	El Ejido	225.40	90,135	399.89
Dalías	Enix	66.78	598	8.95
Dalías	Felix	81.20	770	9.48
Dalías	La Mojonera	23.87	8,677	363.51
Dalías	Roquetas de Mar	59.65	109,204	1,830.74
Dalías	Vícar	64.29	28,835	448.52
	Total	969.39	283,858	292.82

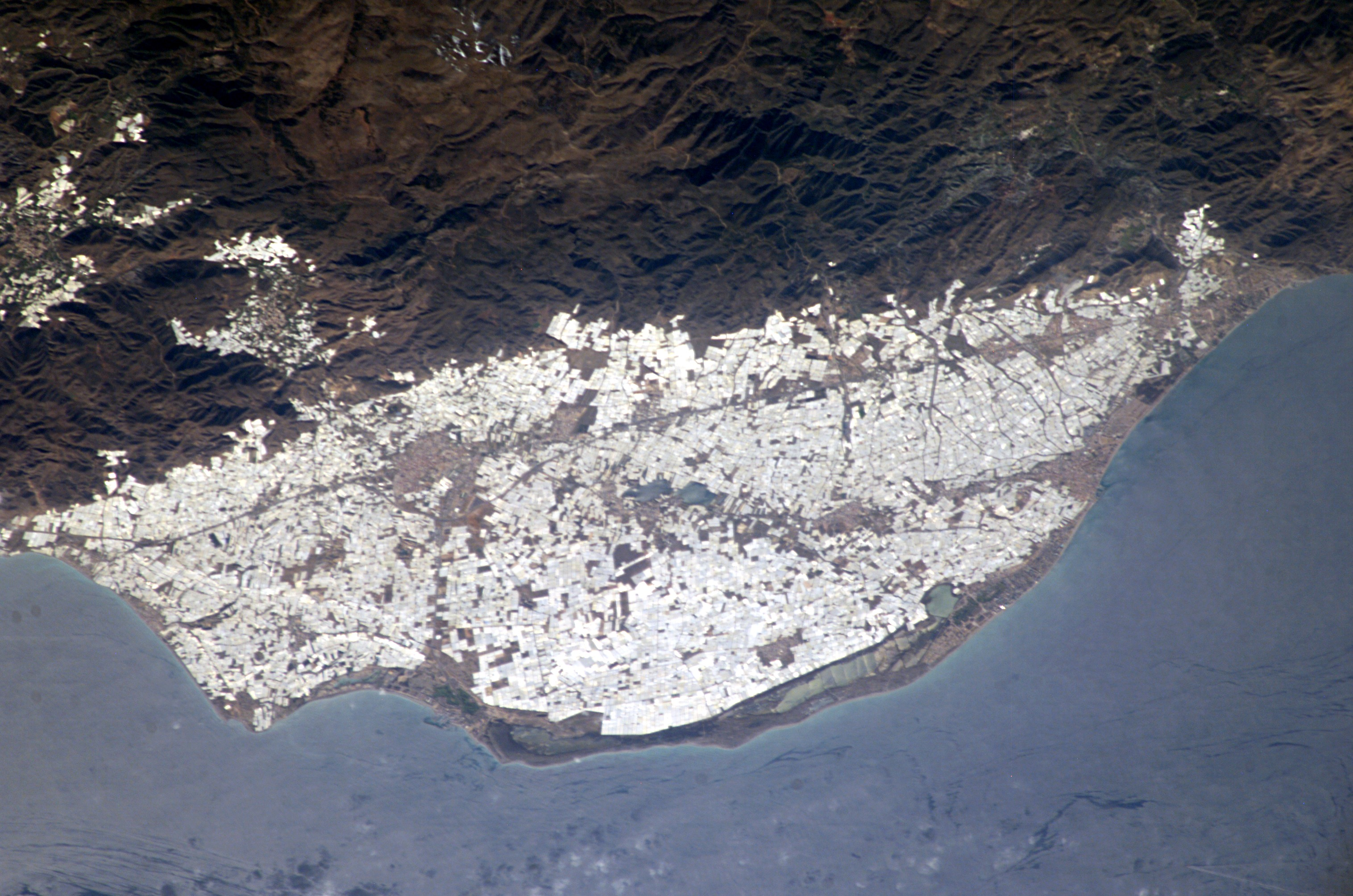
Almería "sea of plastic", as seen from the International Space Station
