= La Mojonera =

La Mojonera, Spain
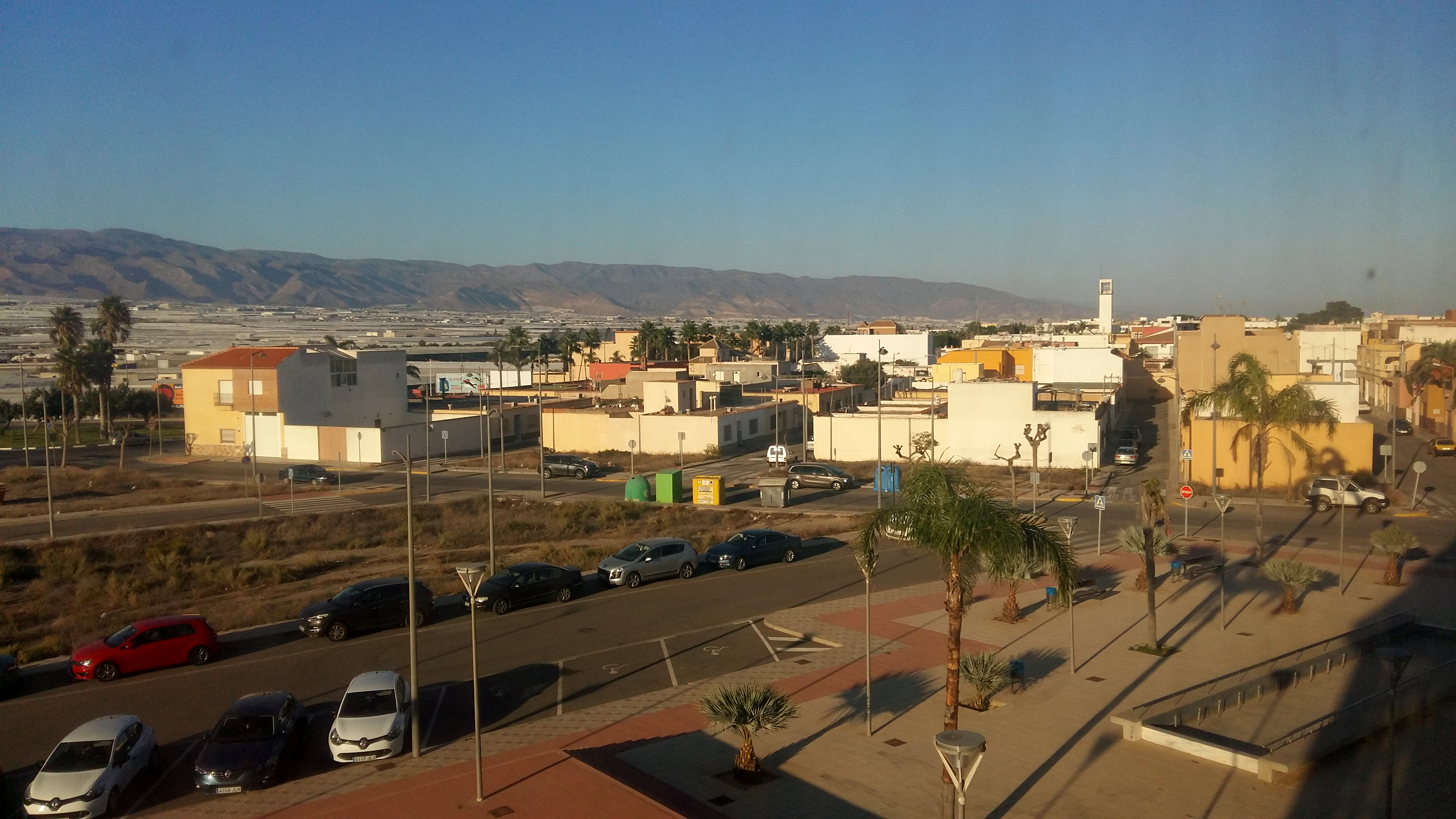

- Flag Coat of arms

- Location of La Mojonera La Mojonera (Andalusia) La Mojonera (Spain)
- Coordinates: 36°45′08″N 2°41′02″W
- Country: Spain
- Community: Andalusia
- Province: Almería
- Comarca: Poniente Almeriense
- Municipality: La Mojonera

Government
  - Mayor (2015 - ): José Miguel Hernández García (Tod@s)

Area
  - Total: 24 km^{2} (9.3 sq mi)
- Elevation: 40 m (130 ft)

Population (2025-01-01)
  - Total: 8,793
  - Density: 370/km^{2} (950/sq mi)
- Time zone: UTC+1 (CET)
  - Summer (DST): UTC+2 (CEST)

La Mojonera is a municipality of Almería province, in the autonomous community of Andalusia, Spain.

== Demographics ==
Historical population
Year	Pop.	±%
1999	6,582	—
2000	6,590	+0.1%
2001	6,901	+4.7%
2002	7,275	+5.4%
2003	7,670	+5.4%
2004	7,746	+1.0%
2005	7,900	+2.0%
2018	9,003	+14.0%
Source: INE (Spain)

== See also ==
- List of municipalities in Almería
