= Roquetas de Mar =

- Municipality
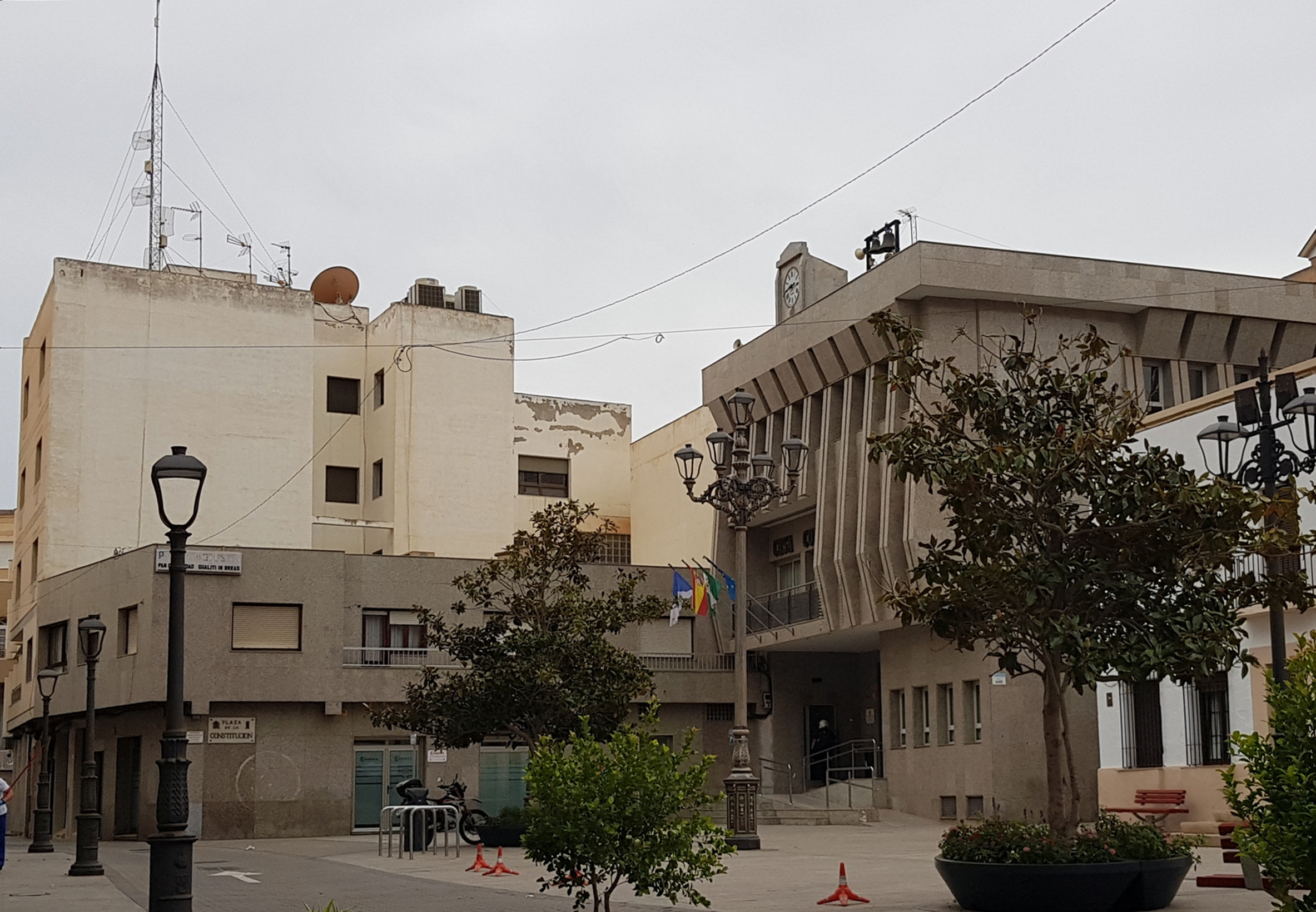
- Town hall

- Flag Coat of arms
- Location of Roquetas de Mar
- Location within Province of Almería Location within Andalusia Location within Spain
- Coordinates: 36°45′51″N 2°36′53″W
- Country: Spain
- Region: Andalusia
- Province: Almería
- Comarca: Poniente Almeriense
- Municipality: Roquetas de Mar

Government
  - Mayor: Gabriel Amat Ayllón (PPA)

Area
  - Total: 60 km^{2} (23 sq mi)
- Elevation: 10 m (33 ft)

Population (2025-01-01)
  - Total: 111,240
  - Density: 1,900/km^{2} (4,800/sq mi)
- Time zone: UTC+1 (CET)
  - Summer (DST): UTC+2 (CEST)
- Website: aytoroquetas.org

Roquetas de Mar (Spanish pronunciation: [roˈketas de maɾ]) is a municipality of Almería province, in the autonomous community of Andalucía, Spain. In 2016, the population was 91,965, the municipality with the second highest population in the province behind the capital, the 14th in Andalucía and the 69th in Spain.

In 1981, in this town, three young men from Santander were murdered by various members of the Spanish Civil Guard, in what is known as the Almería Case.

== Geography and climate ==
Roquetas de Mar has a hot desert climate (Köppen: BWh) bordering on a hot semi-desert climate (Köppen: BSh) with very mild winters and very hot and dry summers. During July and August, Roquetas de Mar has often southern winds coming from Africa, thus increasing the temperatures. Dust storms coming from the Sahara desert are uncommon, but they might happen from time to time.

Climate data for Roquetas de Mar
Month	Jan	Feb	Mar	Apr	May	Jun	Jul	Aug	Sep	Oct	Nov	Dec	Year
Mean daily maximum °C (°F)	17.5 (63.5)	18.5 (65.3)	21.0 (69.8)	22.8 (73.0)	26.0 (78.8)	30.3 (86.5)	33.6 (92.5)	33.5 (92.3)	30.2 (86.4)	25.7 (78.3)	21.2 (70.2)	18.2 (64.8)	24.9 (76.8)
Daily mean °C (°F)	12.8 (55.0)	13.7 (56.7)	16.0 (60.8)	17.6 (63.7)	20.7 (69.3)	24.8 (76.6)	28.0 (82.4)	28.3 (82.9)	25.1 (77.2)	21.0 (69.8)	16.6 (61.9)	13.8 (56.8)	19.9 (67.8)
Mean daily minimum °C (°F)	8.1 (46.6)	8.9 (48.0)	10.9 (51.6)	12.4 (54.3)	15.4 (59.7)	19.3 (66.7)	22.4 (72.3)	23.0 (73.4)	20.0 (68.0)	16.3 (61.3)	12.0 (53.6)	9.4 (48.9)	14.8 (58.7)
Average precipitation mm (inches)	25.4 (1.00)	29.1 (1.15)	21.0 (0.83)	17.0 (0.67)	13.6 (0.54)	4.0 (0.16)	1.2 (0.05)	0.5 (0.02)	14.3 (0.56)	22.1 (0.87)	30.6 (1.20)	38.0 (1.50)	216.8 (8.55)
Source: World Meteorological Organization (WMO)

== Tourism ==
The 'urbanización' (tourist area with hotels and restaurants and shops) of Roquetas is predominantly a Spanish holiday resort for the majority of the summer months, but it also receives many visitors from the United Kingdom, Ireland and Germany. It is one of the two major resorts in Costa de Almería, the other being Mojácar.

== Demographics ==
Historical population
Year	Pop.	±%
1999	42,333	—
2000	44,370	+4.8%
2001	47,570	+7.2%
2002	50,954	+7.1%
2003	53,815	+5.6%
2004	58,519	+8.7%
2005	65,886	+12.6%
2006	71,740	+8.9%
2007	71,279	−0.6%
2008	77,423	+8.6%
2009	82,665	+6.8%
2010	85,808	+3.8%
2011	89,851	+4.7%
2012	90,358	+0.6%
2013	87,868	−2.8%
2014	91,682	+4.3%
2015	90,623	−1.2%
2016	91,965	+1.5%
2017	93,363	+1.5%
2018	94,925	+1.7%
Source: INE (Spain)

Roquetas de Mar is the second most populous municipality in the province of Almería behind its capital. The 2018 padron data counted 94,956 inhabitants, 49,038 of which were men and 45,887 of which were women. The population density is 1600/km^{2}.

== Transport ==
Roquetas is served by the Autovía A-7 on its outskirts and is linked to the town itself by the A-1051. It is the second-largest town in Spain without a rail link behind Marbella; in 2020 a proposal was submitted to build a railway from Almería to Adra via Roquetas and El Ejido.

== Gallery ==
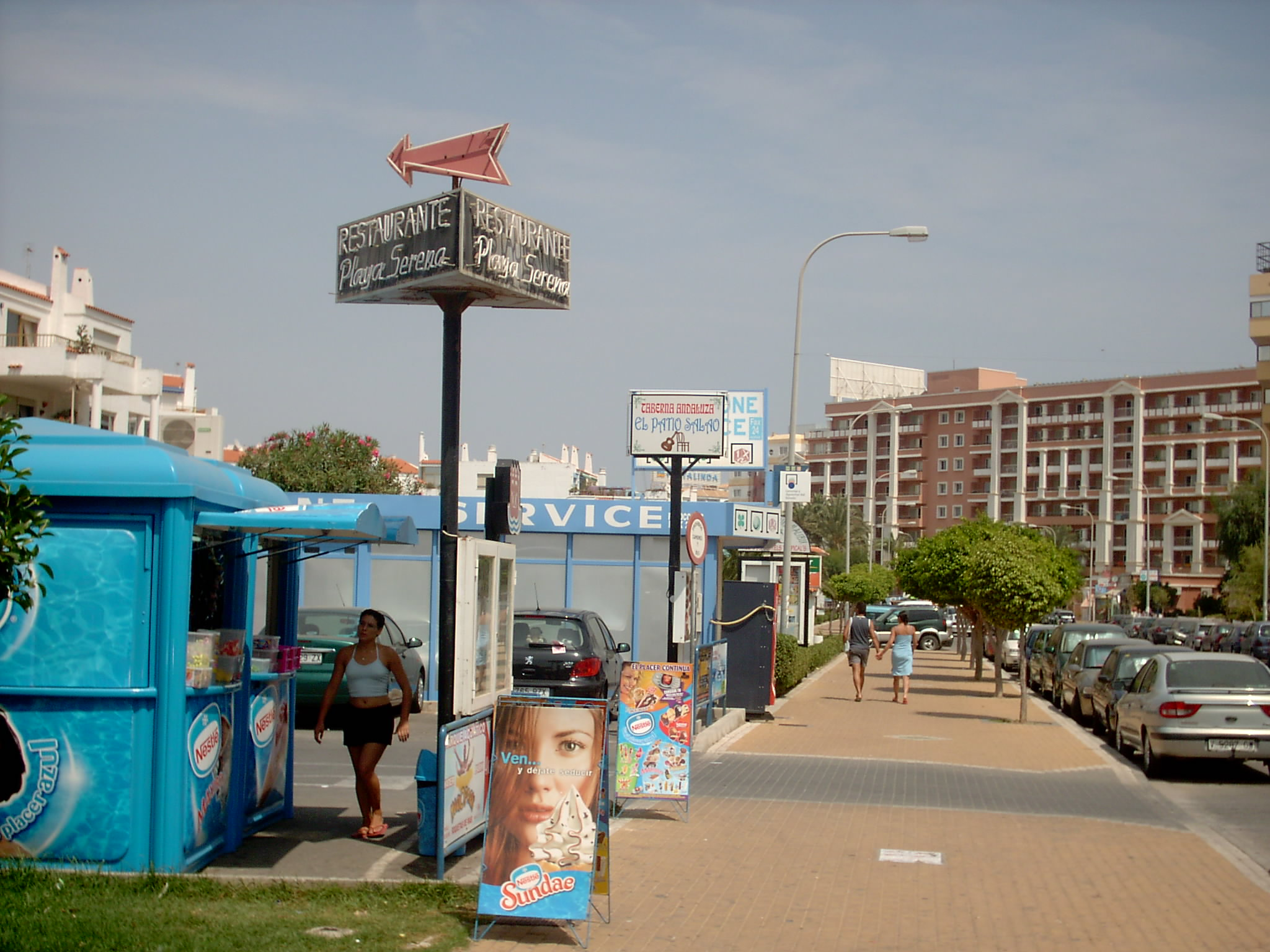
A street in Roquetas de Mar

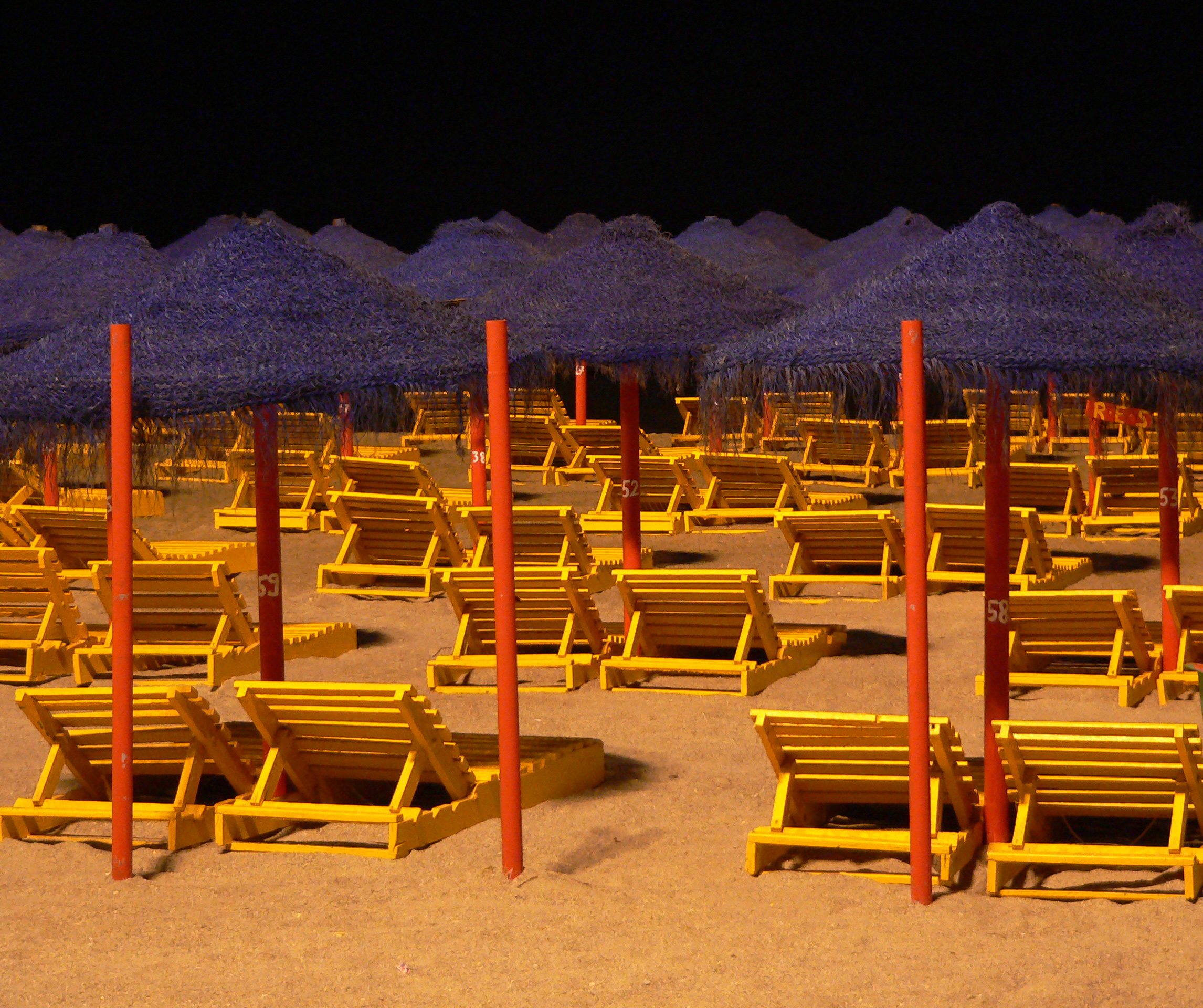
Nocturnal beach at Roquetas de Mar

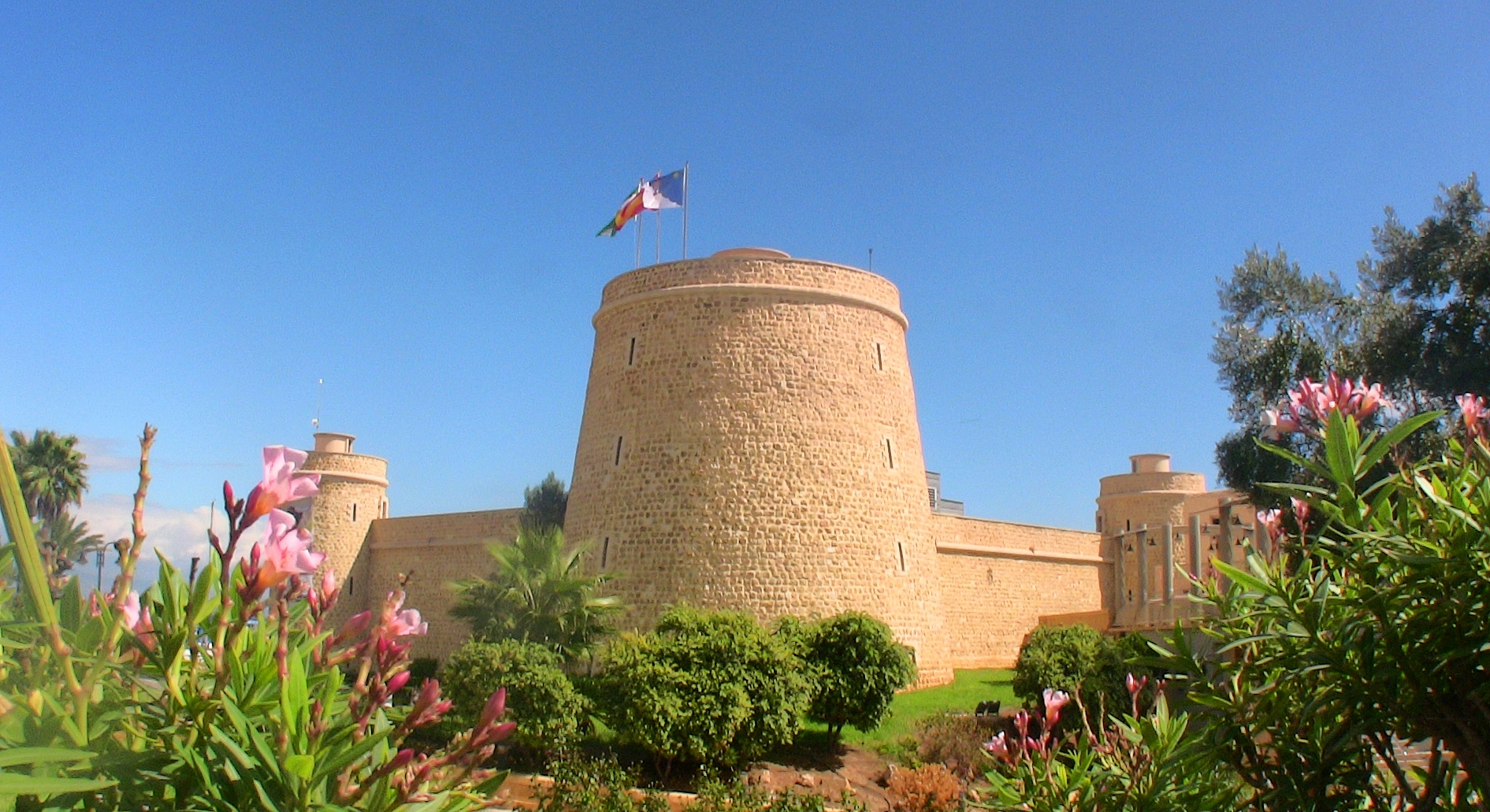
Castillo de Santa Ana, a fortification in Roquetas de Mar.

== See also ==
- APRAMP
- Aguadulce (Almería)
- Roquetas Pidgin Spanish – Dialect spoken by immigrants in Southern Spain
- List of municipalities in Almería
