= Spanish-based creole languages =

Creole language family

A Spanish creole (Spanish: criollo), or Spanish-based creole language, is a creole language (contact language with native speakers) for which Spanish serves as its substantial lexifier.

A number of creole languages are influenced to varying degrees by the Spanish language, including varieties known as Bozal Spanish, Chavacano, and Palenquero. Spanish also influenced other creole languages like Annobonese, Papiamento, and Pichinglis.

Any number of Spanish-based pidgins have arisen due to contact between Spanish and other languages, especially in America, such as the Panare Trade Spanish used by the Panare people of Venezuela and Roquetas Pidgin Spanish used by agricultural workers in Spain. However, few Spanish pidgins ever creolized with speakers of most pidgins eventually adopting Spanish or other language as their main tongue.

== Spanish creole languages ==
=== Bozal Spanish ===
Bozal Spanish is a possibly extinct Spanish-based creole language that may have been a mixture of Spanish and Kikongo, with Portuguese influences. Attestation is insufficient to indicate whether Bozal Spanish was ever a single, coherent or stable language, or if the term merely referred to any idiolect of Spanish that included African elements.

Bozal Spanish was spoken by African slaves in the Spanish Caribbean and other areas of South and Central America from the 17th century up until its possible extinction at around 1850. It has influenced the variety spoken in the Chota Valley in Ecuador, and a Spanish-based creole is still spoken in the Bolivian Yungas.

=== Chavacano ===
Chavacano (also Chabacano) is a group of Spanish-based creole language varieties spoken in the Philippines that emerged during the 18th century following the colonization of the Spaniards in the Philippines. While Chavacano refers to a large number of varieties, there are three main varieties: Ternate, Manila/Cavite, and Zamboanga.Ternate and Manila/Cavite are Northern dialects from Manila Bay on Luzon Island, while Zamboanga is a Southern dialect from Mindanao Island; both of these dialects are genetically related. The variety found in Zamboanga City has the largest number of speakers and is considered to be the most stable while the other varieties are considered to be either endangered or extinct (i.e. Ermitaño).

Creole varieties are spoken in Cavite City and Ternate (both on Luzon); Zamboanga, Cotabato and Davao (on Mindanao), Isabela City and other parts of province of Basilan and elsewhere. According to a 2007 census, there are 2,502,185 speakers in the Philippines. It is the major language of Zamboanga City.

While the different varieties of Chavacano are mostly intelligible to one another, they differ slightly in certain aspects such as in the usage of certain words and certain grammatical syntax. Most of the vocabulary comes from Spanish, while the grammar is mostly based on the Austronesian structure. In Zamboanga, its variant is used in primary education, television, and radio. Recently English and Filipino words have been infiltrating the language and code-switching between these three languages is common among younger speakers.

The name of the language stems from the Spanish word Chabacano which roughly means "tasteless", "common", or "vulgar", this Spanish word, however, has lost its original meaning and carries no negative connotation among contemporary speakers.

For more information see the article on Chavacano, or the Ethnologue Report on Chavacano.

=== Palenquero ===
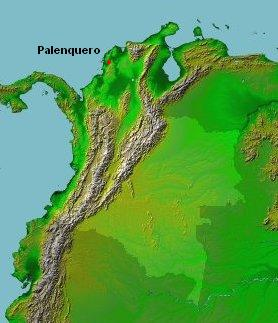
Palenquero

Palenquero (also Palenque) is a Spanish-based creole spoken in Colombia.

The ethnic group which speaks this creole consisted of only 2,500 people in 1989.

It is spoken in Colombia, in the village of San Basilio de Palenque which is south and east of Cartagena, and in some neighborhoods of Barranquilla.

The village was founded by fugitive slaves (Maroons) and Native Americans. Since many slaves had been only slightly exposed to contact with European people, the palenqueros spoke creole languages derived from Spanish and from their ancestral African languages.

Spanish speakers are unable to understand Palenquero. There is some influence from the Kongo language of the Democratic Republic of Congo. In 1998, only 10% of the population younger than 25 spoke Palenquero. It is most commonly spoken by the elderly.

For more information see the Ethnologue Report on Palenquero.

== Spanish-influenced creole languages ==
=== Annobonese Creole ===
The Annobonese Creole, locally called Fa d'Ambö (Fa d'Ambu or even Fá d'Ambô) is a Portuguese-based creole, similar to Forro, with some borrowings from Spanish. It is spoken by 9,000 people on the islands of Ano Bom and Bioko, in Equatorial Guinea. In fact, Fa d'Ambu shares the same structure of Forro (82% of lexicon).

In the 15th century, the island was uninhabited and discovered by Portugal but, by the 18th century, Portugal exchanged it and some other territories in Africa for Uruguay with Spain. Spain wanted to get territory in Africa, and Portugal wanted to enlarge even more the territory that they saw as the "New Portugal" (Brazil). Nevertheless, the populace of Ano Bom was against the shift and was hostile toward the Spaniards. This hostility, combined with their isolation from mainland Equatorial Guinea and their proximity to São Tomé and Príncipe—just 400 km from the island—has assured the maintenance of its identity.

Fa d'Ambu has gained some words of Spanish origin (10% of lexicon), but some words are dubious in origin because Spanish and Portuguese are closely related languages.

=== Papiamento ===
Papiamento is spoken in the Dutch Caribbean. It is a Portuguese-based creole, with a large influence from Spanish, some influence from Dutch and a little from Indigenous American languages, English and African languages. Spoken in Aruba, Bonaire, Curaçao, by 341,300 people in 2019. It was made the official language, alongside Dutch and English, in 2007.

Today, the Venezuelan Spanish influence is very strong, especially on the Aruban dialect, but, due to the similarities between the Iberian Romance languages, it is difficult to ascertain whether a certain feature is derived from Portuguese or from Spanish.

=== Pichinglis ===
Pichinglis is spoken on Bioko island, Equatorial Guinea. It originated with the arrival of Krio speakers from the mainland. Krio is a creole that derives most of its vocabulary from English, but the Spanish colonization of Guinea exerted Spanish influence on its lexicon and grammar.

== See also ==
Spanish-based interlanguages:

- Castrapo (Galician)
- Chipilo (Venetian)
- Cocoliche, Lunfardo (Italian)
- Frespañol/Fragnol (French)
- Jopará, the standard mixture with Guarani
- Portuñol/Portunhol (Portuguese)
- Spanglish, Llanito (English)
