= El Ejido, Los Santos =

El Ejido
- Corregimiento
- Location within Panama
- Coordinates: 7°55′00″N 80°23′00″W
- Country: Panama
- Province: Los Santos
- District: Los Santos
- Established: May 2, 2017

Population (2010)
  - Total: 1,280
- Population density calculated based on land area.
- Time zone: UTC5 (EST)

El Ejido is a corregimiento in Los Santos District, Los Santos Province, Panama, created on May 7, 2017 from parts of the corregimiento of Santa Ana.
