= Felix, Spain =

Felix
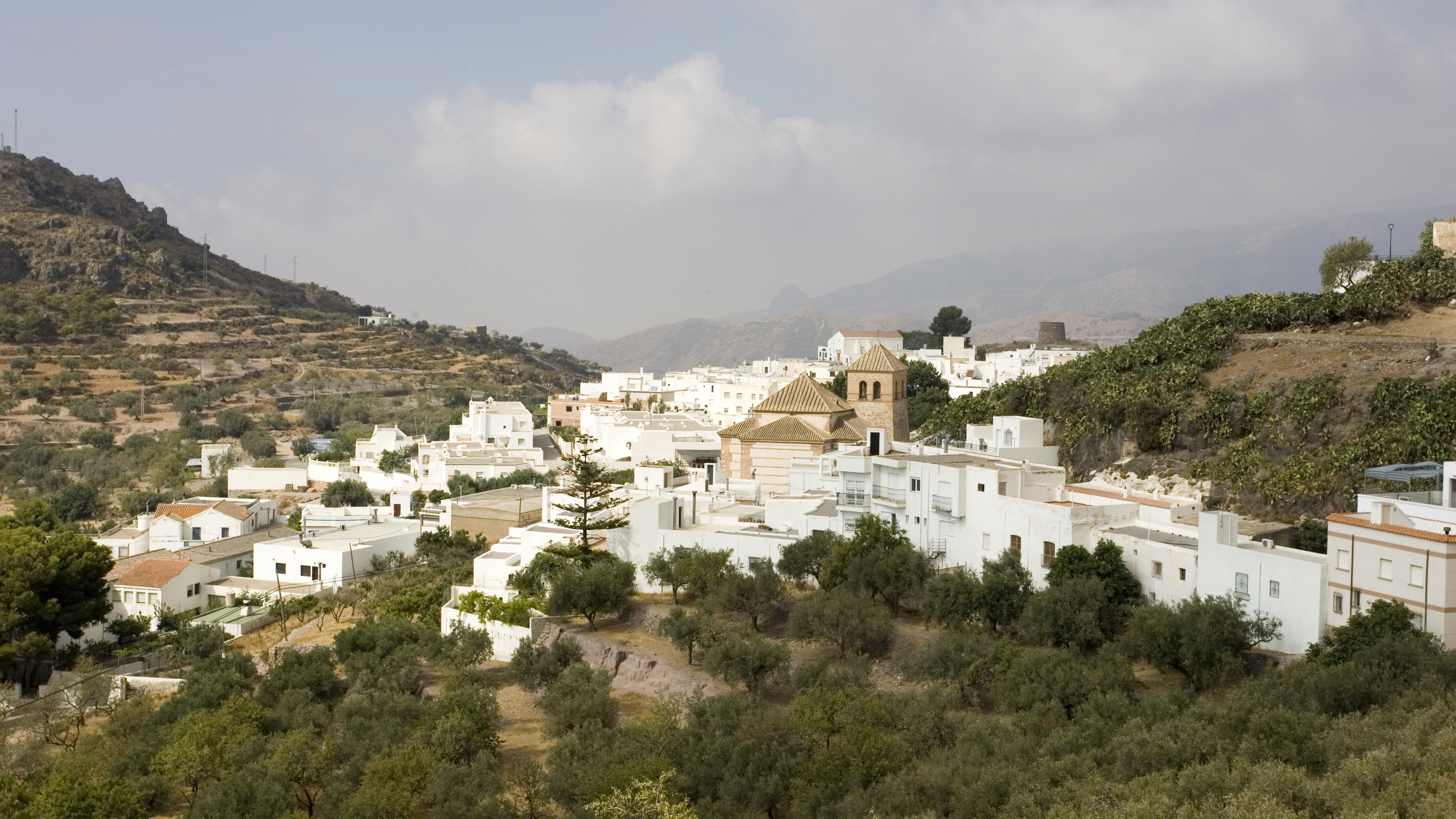

- Flag Coat of arms

- Location Felix (Spain)
- Coordinates: 36°52′07″N 2°39′28″W
- Country: Spain
- Community: Andalusia
- Province: Almería
- Comarca: Poniente Almeriense
- Municipality: Felix

Government
  - Mayor (2011- ): Baldomero Martínez Carretero (PPA)

Area
  - Total: 81 km^{2} (31 sq mi)
- Elevation: 815 m (2,674 ft)

Population (2025-01-01)
  - Total: 771
  - Density: 9.5/km^{2} (25/sq mi)
- Time zone: UTC+1 (CET)
  - Summer (DST): UTC+2 (CEST)

Felix (Spanish: [feˈli(ɣ)s]) is a municipality of Almería province, in the autonomous community of Andalusia, Spain.

== Demographics ==
Historical population
Year	Pop.	±%
1999	575	—
2000	571	−0.7%
2001	562	−1.6%
2002	566	+0.7%
2003	557	−1.6%
2004	564	+1.3%
2005	534	−5.3%

== See also ==
- List of municipalities in Almería
