= Ciavieja =

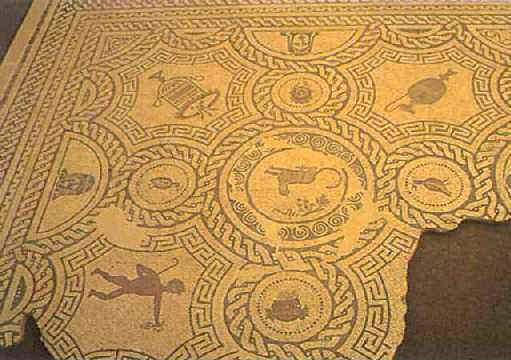
Ciavieja mosaic

Ciavieja (Murgi) was an ancient Roman city located in Hispania. It was the political and administrative center of territorium Murgitanum, which extended up to sierra de Gádor and Mediterranean Sea to the south, and to Urci and Abdera to the east and west, respectively.

It was mentioned by Pliny the Elder, who described its boundaries between Tarraconensis and Baetica. Claudius Ptolemy placed it between Detunda and Salduba, two turduli cities.

The oldest finds date back to the Copper Age. Evidence of settlement has been located from the Bronze Age to Roman Hispania, a period from which the civitas stipendiaria of Murgi dates. In 1983 a mosaic was discovered by Andrés Ramírez Franco, an engineer who used a metal detector. The archaeological excavation started two years later, and its works are being carried out until today, including guided visits. The last excavations in 2020 and 2026 were directed by Carmen Ana Pardo, archaeologist of Ancient History Department at Universidad de Almería.

In May 2026 it started new works on the baths and prerroman wall, extending the archaeological zone and restoring wall paintings. In October 2026 it announced new guided tours and archaeological activities.

== Bibliography ==
- Lázaro Pérez, Rafael (28 October 2016). La Respublica Murgitana y sus monumentos epigráficos (El Ejido-Almería). Universidad de Almería. p. 9-10. ISBN 9788416642212.
