= José María Rubio =

Spanish Jesuit

Saint José María Rubio SJ
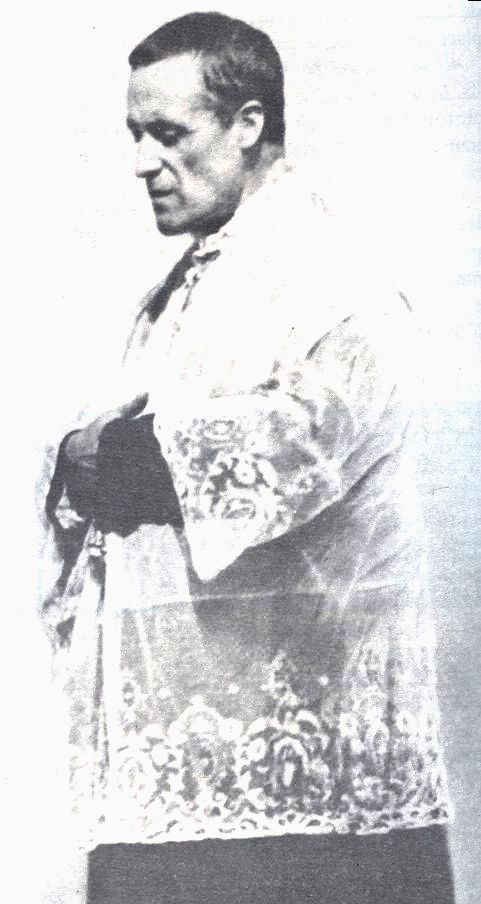

Priest
- Born: 22 July 1864; Dalías, Spain
- Died: 2 May 1929 (aged 64); Aranjuez, Spain
- Venerated in: Roman Catholic Church
- Beatified: 6 October 1985, Vatican City by John Paul II
- Canonized: 4 May 2003, Madrid by John Paul II
- Feast: 2 May

Jose Maria Rubio, SJ (22 July 1864 – 2 May 1929) was a Spanish Jesuit, known as the "Apostle of Madrid". He was canonised in 2003 by Pope John Paul II.

== Childhood and adolescence ==
Son of farmers and the oldest of thirteen brothers, born to Francisco Rubio and Mercedes Peralta, he grew up in the town of Dalías, until in 1876 he entered the diocesan seminary of Almeria, where he studied Human Studies and Philosophy.

In 1878 he then studied Philosophy and Theology for four years at the major seminary in Granada, where he was sponsored and protected by the professor and canon Joaquin Torres Asensio. On Ascensio's move to Madrid, Rubio followed his professor to study theology for a fifth year. He was ordained September 24, 1887 and celebrated his first Mass on October 12 on the altar of the conversion of San Luis Gonzaga of the then Cathedral of San Isidro in Madrid. He obtained a degree in theology in 1896 and a doctorate in Canon Law from Toledo in 1897.

== Priest in suburban Madrid ==
He then worked for three years as curate at Chinchón and in 1889 became pastor at Estremera. In both villages he was notable for his extreme austerity, his catechesis of children, and service of the poorest. Later, as Chaplain of Bernardine nuns in the church of the Sacrament in Almudena parish, he became distinguished by his activity in the suburbs of the capital with the cleaners and "dressmakers". In 1890 he began to teach Latin literature, pastoral theology and metaphysics at the seminary in Madrid, and was a notary and registrar of the vicariate of the diocese.

== Jesuit ==
During a pilgrimage to the Holy Land in 1904 he underwent deep spiritual experiences. During this period he described himself as a "fan of the Jesuits", because since his time as a student of theology at Granada he had wanted to join the Order. He entered the Jesuit novitiate in Granada in 1906 and made his religious profession in 1908. After the novitiate, he reviewed his theology for a year and had pastoral experience in Seville. After tertianship in 1910 at Manresa (Barcelona), he was sent to Madrid, where he took final vows at his residence at Calle de la Flor Baja and where lived the rest of his life.

He was a withdrawn and modest man, of great charity and tireless devotion to work. He excelled as a preacher and as a regular confessor, which caused long lines of faithful who were looking for support and spiritual help. His effectiveness and reputation grew quickly throughout the city. He was noted for his love of the poor, and preached often about one's responsibility for others. Many came forward to ask how they could help. Under his guidance, they opened tuition-free schools offering academic formation as well as instruction in various trades.

In 1911 the International Eucharistic Congress in Madrid instituted the "Guard of Honor of the Sacred Heart" and entrusted it to Rubio. He developed his work in towns and suburbs, and founded and organized several associations such as the work of the "Marys of the Tabernacles", and social schools in Ventilla neighborhoods, aided by young teachers Juan and Demetrio de Andrés, known as "Ventilla martyrs" killed during the Civil War, 1936.

He died in Madrid on May 2, 1929, sitting in an armchair, after directing that his spiritual notes be burned. When he died, the Archbishop of Madrid, Leopoldo Eijo y Garay, called him "apostle of Madrid" and wrote a pastoral letter on his example to the clergy of his diocese.

== Canonization ==
During his life miraculous events were reported, such as bilocation, healings, prophecy and clairvoyance, some, perhaps legendary, but others ratified by numerous witnesses. What dominates is the testimony of his example and his word next to the message that holiness is available to all who simply surrender to the will of God. His motto was: "Do what God wants and want what God does."

Peralta's spiritual writings were approved by theologians on 23 December 1952. He was beatified by John Paul II in Rome (October 6, 1985) and canonized in Madrid by the same pontiff (May 4, 2003). His remains are venerated in the church of San Francisco de Borja and the Sacred Heart of the Society of Jesus in Madrid. The extraordinary fact, considered as a miracle by the Congregation for the Causes of Saints in order for his canonization, was the healing of lung cancer of the Jesuit José Luis Gómez Munten (1988).

== Anecdotes in the life of José María Rubio ==
Rubio was a famous confessor. People came from long distances and queued for several hours to be shriven by Fr. Rubio.

Visit to the dying One day a lady came and gave him the directions to a man who had to confess soon, as he was dying. That evening, Rubio went to visit the dying, and following the directions, he had to go to a third floor without a lift. When he finally arrived, knocked and asked for the gentleman, "It's me" the gentleman said "but I think that someone has played a practical joke on you, as you see I'm in perfect health. Come on, man! have a drink and relax after you have had to climb so many stairs." Entering the room, Rubio saw a portrait on the wall, and while the man served him a drink. Rubio said that the lady was the one who sent him. The man laughed and said that the lady was his mother who died some years ago. Then, the gentleman said; "Look, anyway, as you are here, I'm going to confess because it's been years since I entered a church, and so your journey will not have been in vain". He confessed and died that night.

The seamstress

A seamstress from Madrid told in confession that her father hated the faith, and considered the Christian religion a swindle and a lie. Thus, she was afraid of the eternal damnation of her father. Rubio said that she should not be worried, as her father would be saved.

Some days after the confession, during a retreat and preaching, that seamstress came late. At the moment when she arrived, Rubio paused for a moment in his speech and said in loud voice: "At this very moment one of you just received a very special grace. Really very, very big. In a few days you will know what it is and whoever of you has received this, that lucky person has to thank our Lord Jesus Christ".

All women who were there present took note of the time and day, as he was already famous for these prophecies that were fulfilled. The seamstress in a few days noticed that his father died holy, and just at that time when Rubio was preaching, her father was confessing and receiving the last sacraments.

== Reflection by José María Rubio ==
You do very well in not seeking or wanting anything other than the fulfillment of the will of God. It is the surest way to sanctify the soul. This is life-giving sacrifice. It's what we want from the Divine Heart.
