= La Ribera de Algaida =

Archaeological site in Spain

Turaniana
- La Ribera de Algaida
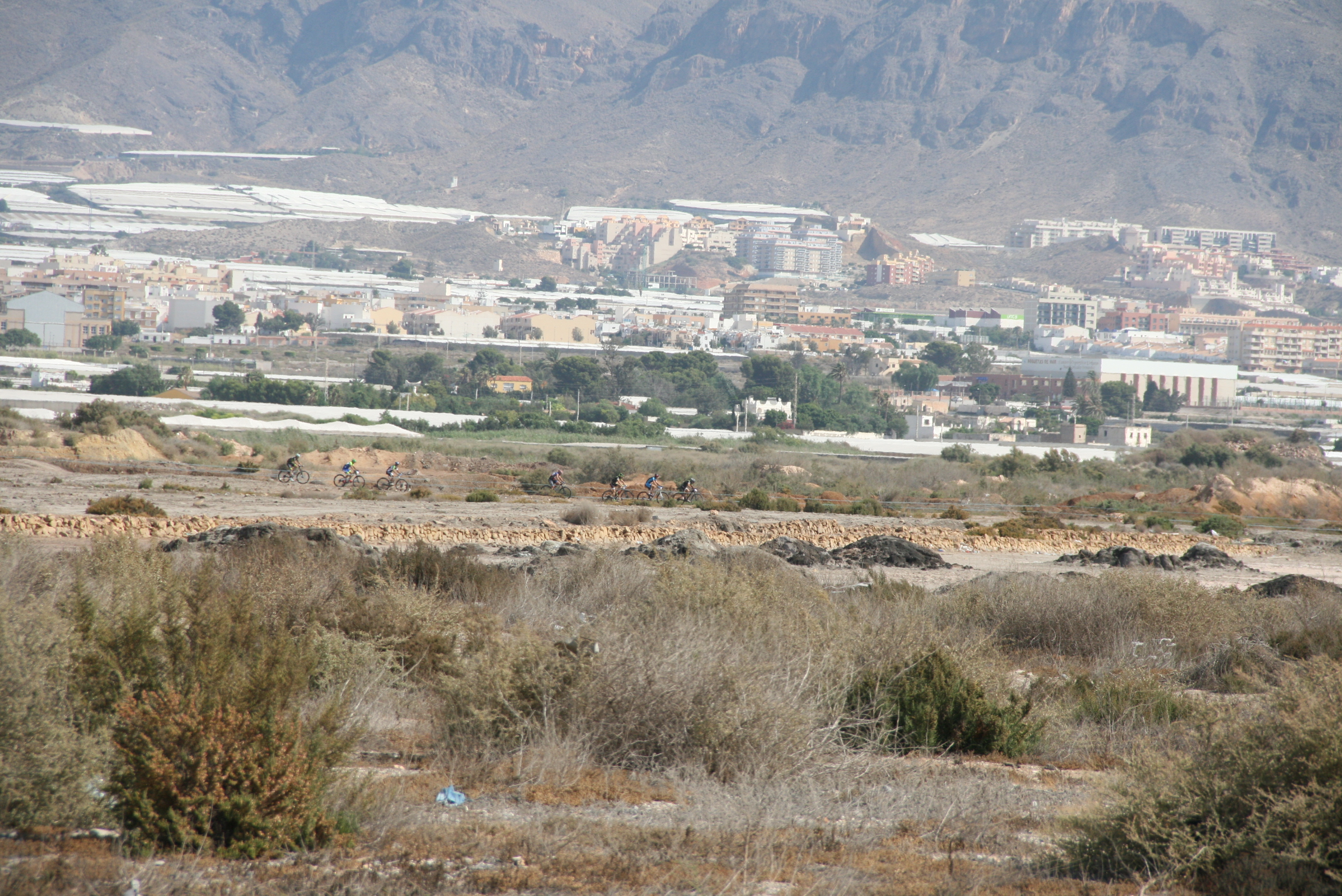
- Interactive map of Turaniana
- 36°47′31″N 2°35′13″W
- Location: Aguadulce

Site notes
- Archaeologists: Grupo de Investigación HUM145 - Abdera
- Discovered: 1859

The archaeological site of La Ribera de Algaida or Ribera de Turaniana is located in Aguadulce (Almería), Spain and discovered in 1859.

The site is one of the most important human settlements in the history of Almería, Spain, due to its size and long-term occupation. It has an area of 20 to 30 hectares (49 to 74 acres), and was occupied during the late Copper Age (from the Argaric culture until the Roman Era).

On 17 September 1991 it was added to the Bien de Interés Cultural (BIC) heritage register with the category of archaeological site.
