= Sierra de Gádor =

Mountain range in Almería, Spain

Coordinates: 36°54′N 2°47′W

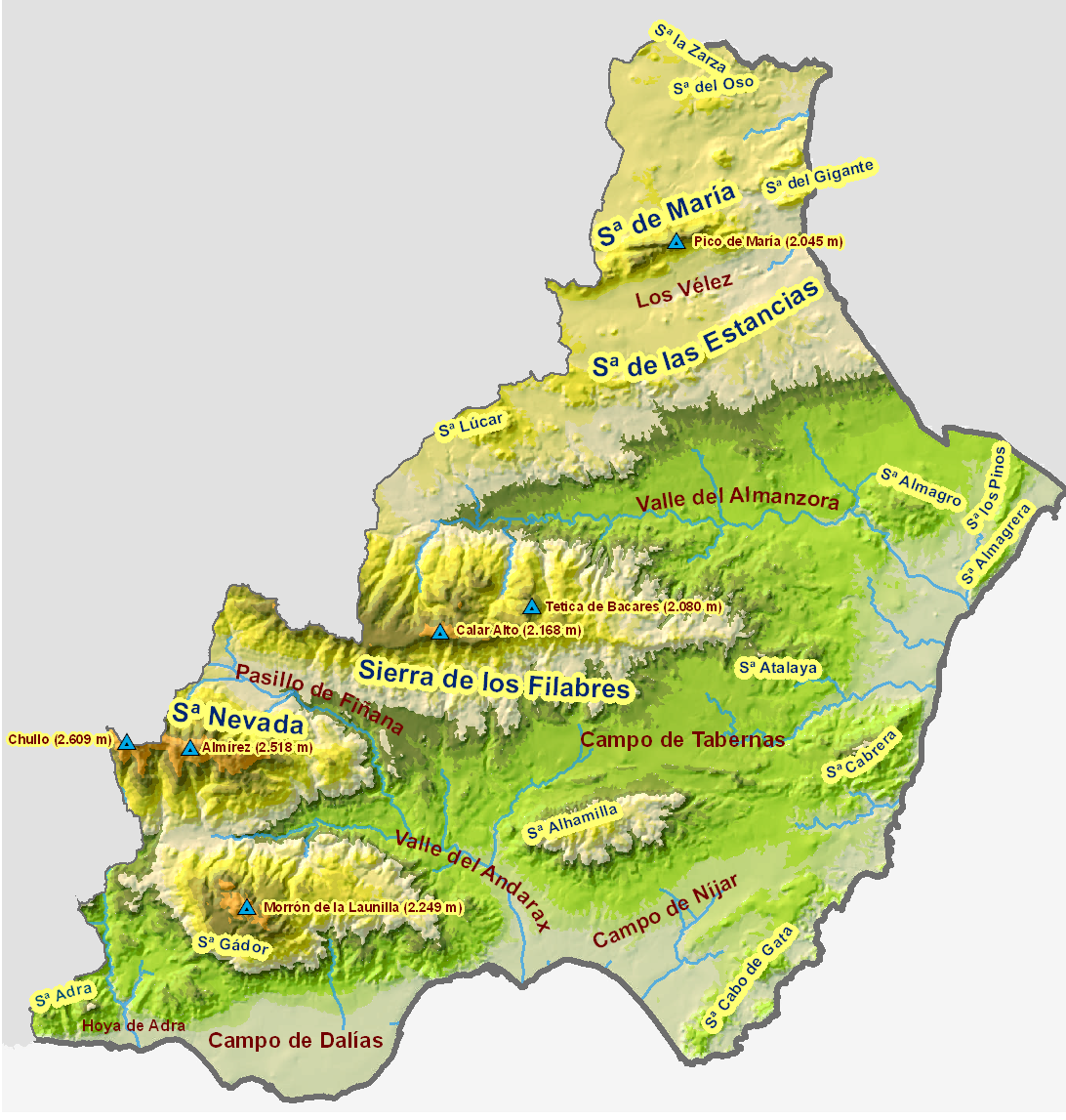
Location of S.Gador in the Almería relief map

Sierra de Gádor of Sierra Gador is a mountain range in southwest of the province of Almería, Spain.

It is bordered to the north by Sierra Nevada and to the south by the Mediterranean Sea.

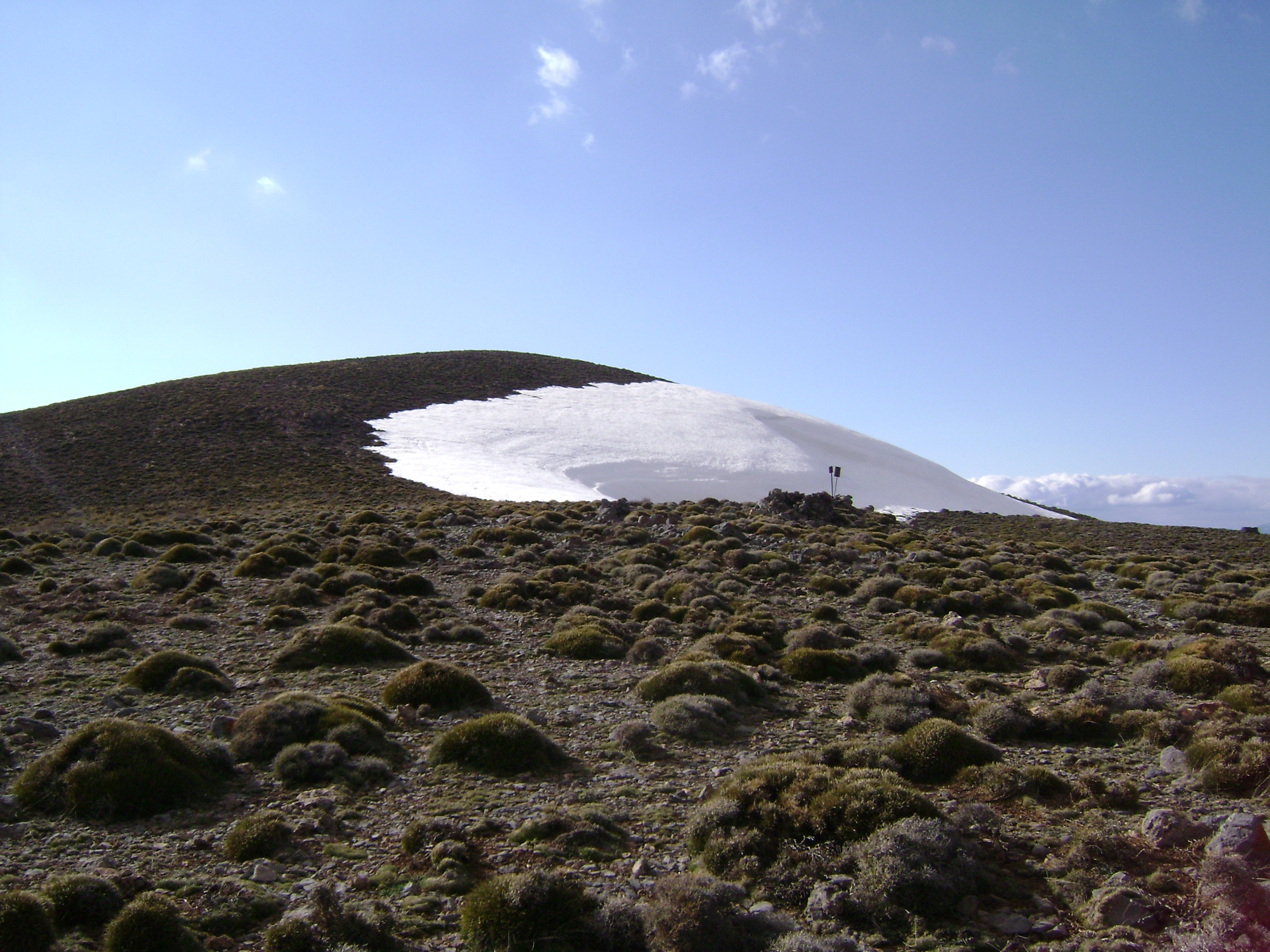
Morrón de la Lagunilla summit

It is an isolated massif in an arid and semi-arid complex. It has a very uneven relief. The highest peaks are Morrón de la Lagunilla (2,247 m), Pico Colorado (2,215 m), Pico de las Cabras (2,000 m), Nuevo Mundo (2,215 m), el Pecho Cuchillo (1,955 m) and Dos Hermanas (1,996 m). Its average height decrease to the east, with peaks Molinero (1,499 m), Piorno (1,444 m) and Pozuelo (1,263 m).

The eastern part is also known as Sierra de Enix, named after the city of Enix, the only major populated place in the area. This part may be geologically divided into two distinct areas: a valley made up of sedimentary materials and the hilly area with elevations up to 1,000 m covered mostly by bushes and grasslands.
