= El Ejido, la loi du profit =

- Directed by: Jawad Rhalib
- Screenplay by: Caroline Becker
- Produced by: Latcho Drom, Clap d’Ort Films
- Cinematography: Philippe Therasse
- Edited by: Karima Saïdi
- Music by: Marc Van Eyck
- Release date: 2006
- Running time: 134 minutes
- Country: Belgium

El Ejido, la loi du profit is a Belgian 2006 documentary film.

== Synopsis ==
Today, the formerly-desertic region of Almeria in southern Spain produces one third of Europe's winter consumption of fruits and vegetables and reaps two thirds of the country's farm profits. This 'economic miracle' in a greenhouse relies on the labour of nearly 80,000 immigrants, half of whom do not have working papers. In a destroyed environment where the air is vitiated by pesticides and ground water is running out, the village of El Ejido illustrates, almost to the point of caricature, this industrial exploitation of men and the land encouraged by globalisation. Driss, Moussaid and Djibril are day-labourers there, working for a pittance and, as is the case with most of their peers, without a working contract. They stay in chabolas, small constructions made of cardboard and plastic, without water or electricity. It is a near-slavery that fills our tables.

== Awards ==
- FESPACO 2007
