= Santa Ana, Los Santos =

Coordinates: 7.6667°N 80.4167°W

Santa Ana
- Corregimiento
- Location within Panama
- Country: Panama
- Province: Los Santos
- District: Los Santos

Area
  - Land: 69.7 km^{2} (26.9 sq mi)

Population (2010)
  - Total: 3,329
  - Density: 47.8/km^{2} (124/sq mi)
- Population density calculated based on land area.
- Time zone: UTC−5 (EST)

Santa Ana is a corregimiento in Los Santos District, Los Santos Province, Panama with a population of 3,329 as of 2010. Its population as of 1990 was 2,652; its population as of 2000 was 2,970.
