= Bozal Spanish =

Extinct Spanish creole

- español bozal
- Native to: Latin America
- Extinct: Date unknown (gradual assimilation); Last documentation: 1850 (in Cuba)
- Language family: Spanish-based creole?

Language codes
- ISO 639-3: None (mis)
- Glottolog: None

Bozal Spanish is a possibly extinct Spanish-based creole language or pidgin that may have been a mixture of Spanish and Kikongo, with Portuguese influences. Attestation is insufficient to indicate whether Bozal Spanish was ever a single, coherent or stable language, or if the term merely referred to any idiolect of Spanish that included African elements.

== Etymology ==
Bozal is the Spanish word for "muzzle", and shares its etymology with the word bosal. In their New World colonies, the Spaniards distinguished between negros ladinos ("Latinate Negroes", those who had spent more than a year in a Spanish-speaking territory) and negros bozales (wild, untamed Negroes; those born in or freshly arrived from Africa).

Similarly, the Portuguese distinguished between índios mansos (tamed, domesticated Indians) and índios bravos (untamed, wild Indians), and between negros crioulos or ladinos (Black creoles born in the territory of a European empire) and negros africanos or boçais (blacks born in Africa) (crioulo has now become the main anti-black slur in Brazilian Portuguese, whereas the Spanish cognate, criollo came to refer to Hispanoamerican whites and castizos).

== Historic use ==
Bozal Spanish was spoken by African slaves in Cuba, Uruguay and other areas of South and Central America from the 17th century up until its possible extinction at around 1850. Although Bozal Spanish is extinct as a language, its influence still exists. In some Cuban folk religious rituals today, people speak what they call "Bozal". Similarly, many songs of the afro genre, which flourished in Cuba in the 1930s and '40s, contain lyrics reminiscent of the language.

In Puerto Rico esclavos bozales were slaves ("esclavos") brought from Africa, as opposed to those born in Puerto Rico from slaves. Such slaves spoke different languages, other than Spanish, which they eventually learned while enslaved. These slaves were primarily used in the fields and agriculture as opposed to those born under bondage who were generally used in domestic chores.

== See also ==
- Slavery in colonial Spanish America
- Papiamento
