= Intensive farming in Almería =

Greenhouse agriculture in southern Spain

Location of the province of Almeria (Spain).

The intensive agriculture of the province of Almeria, Spain, is a model of the utilization of highly technical means to achieve maximum economic yield based on the rational use of water, use of plastic greenhouses, highly technical training and high levels of employment of inputs, applied to the special characteristics of a particular environment. The greenhouses (invernaderos) are located between Motril and Almeria. The area of El Ejido is well known to be agriculturally productive. The large scale of greenhouse deployments has been claimed to raise the albedo of the Earth's surface in the region, resulting in ~0.3 °C cooling per decade locally since the 1980s.

== History ==
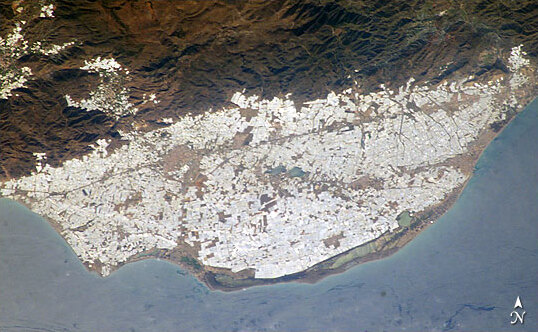
Campo de Dalías satellite image and its "plastic sea" formed by greenhouses.

The first greenhouse was built in 1963 and the technique was extended by the Campo de Dalías or Poniente Almeriense and later by the Campo de Níjar, in the east. The use of polyethylene as a substitute for glass had already been tested in the Canary Islands and Catalonia. The plastic was spread over wooden posts or metal structures and secured by wire. The transparent plastic intensifies the heat and maintains the humidity. This allows harvests to be harvested one month earlier than in an open field and ahead of other regions, starting harvesting in December and allowing the plant growth of the autumn-winter plantings until March. This allows for doubling, and sometimes tripling, the number of harvests.

=== Migrant agricultural workers ===
Beginning in the 2000s in the El Ejido region of Andalusia, African (including large numbers of Moroccan) immigrant greenhouse workers have been documented as being faced with severe social marginalization and racism while simultaneously exposed to extremely difficult working conditions with significant exposure to toxic pesticides. The El Ejido region has been described by environmentalists as a "sea of plastic" due to the expansive swaths of land covered by greenhouses, and has also been labeled "Europe's dirty little secret" due to the documented abuses of workers who help produce large quantities of Europe's food supply.

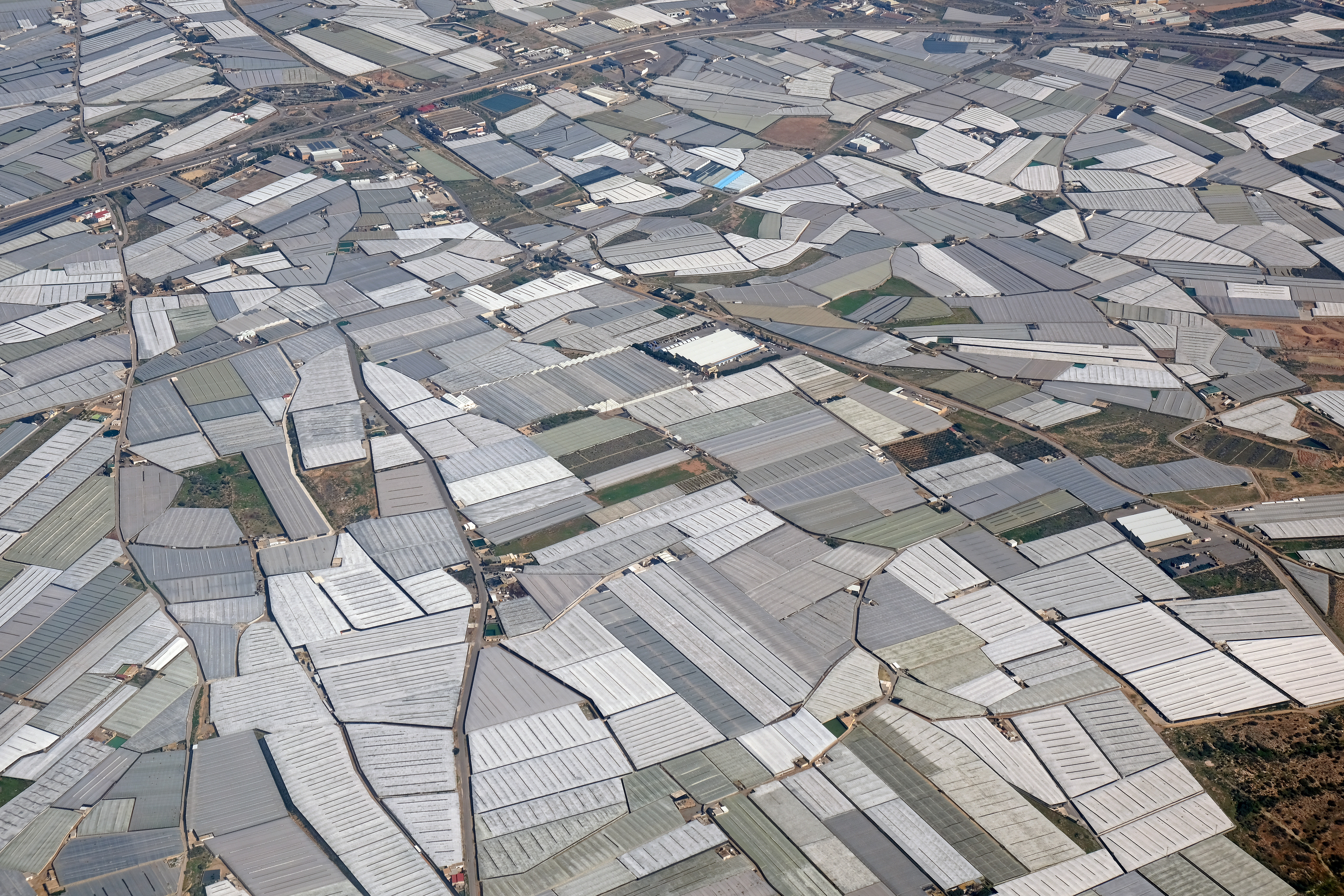
Greenhouses at El Ejido

In these greenhouses, workers are allegedly required to work under "slave-like" conditions in temperatures as high as 50 degrees Celsius with nonexistent ventilation, while being denied basic rest facilities and earning extremely low wages, among other workplace abuses. As of 2015, out of 120,000 immigrant workers employed in the greenhouses, 80,000 are undocumented and not protected by Spanish labour legislation, according to Spitou Mendy of the Spanish Field Workers Syndicate (SOC). Workers have complained of ill health effects as a result of exposure to pesticides without proper protective equipment.

=== Groundwater pollution and drilling of water wells ===
Groundwater is being polluted with fertilizers and pesticides. Some 5200 tons of chemical waste is dumped into the area each year.

The local government has also banned drilling new water wells, but this is often ignored and new wells are drilled up to a depth of 2000 meters.

=== Plastic waste ===
Some 30 000 tons of plastic waste is created each year, and in places where the soil has become infertile, the greenhouses are abandoned after plastics shredding. The plastic waste from the greenhouses is reported to run off into the Mediterranean Sea.

== Commercial evolution ==
In February 2010 a new certification regulation of the N brand of AENOR for fruits and vegetables for fresh consumption came into force. This regulation describes the control system of the ISO 155 standard. This mark guarantees to customers that the products comply with quality protocols that include good agricultural practices, respect for the environment, traceability and social measures. The fulfillment of the norm covers almost all the requirements that the great European distribution demands to the producers of fruits and vegetables. These standards are homologated with the GLOBALGAP protocol.

According to data from EXTENDA (Andalusian Agency for Foreign Promotion), the value of exports of fruit and vegetables in 2012 amounted to 1,914.1 million euros, a growth of 9.7% compared to 2011. Fresh vegetables and vegetables contributed 1,665.5 million. There were 359 exporting companies, 222 regular. These sales accounted for 47.3% of the total of the autonomous community. Among the client countries are Germany, 29.7% of the total, France, 15%, the Netherlands, 13.1%, the United Kingdom, 11.3%, and Italy, 7.2%. They are followed by Poland, Belgium, Sweden, Denmark and Portugal. According to the same source, in the first six months of 2013 sales totaled 1,600 million euros, 14.6% more than the previous year.

Between January and October 2013, the province exported more than 12.8 million kilos of live plants and cut flowers, 18.4% more than in the same period of 2012. The turnover amounted to almost 18.7 million euros, 56% more. Exports of ornamental plants accounted for more than 17.8 million euros, an increase of 59% over the same period in 2012. The main buyers are France, with 59.6% of the plants, Germany, with a 14.2%, and the Netherlands, with 10.6%. They are followed by Belgium, Portugal, Italy, United Kingdom, United States and Morocco.

The specialization of farmers by a single product is increasingly observed, as is the concentration of gender marketing in a few large firms. The largest companies such as Agroponiente, Unica Group, CASI, Alhóndiga La Unión, Agroiris and Vicasol account for 35% of the market share in 2015.

== Sustainable practices ==
Some farms in El Ejido have begun to take up sustainable growing practices, i.e. practicing integrated pest management (IPM), using biological crop protection and residue-free growing. Some comply to very strict specifications, forcing them to develop a greenhouse management system based on the principles of integrated production with a minimum use of synthetic products for fertilization (meaning that no pesticides are used).

=== Integrated pest management (IPM) ===
In agriculture, integrated pest management (IPM) or integrated pest control (IPC) is understood as a strategy that uses a variety of complementary methods: physical, mechanical, chemical, biological, genetic, legal and cultural for control of pests. These methods are applied in three stages: prevention, observation and application. It is an ecological method that aims to reduce or eliminate the use of pesticides and minimize the impact on the environment. There is also talk about ecological pest management (EPM) and natural pest management.

Up to 2015, 60% of the area devoted to horticultural crops in the province used biological pest control techniques. The percentages are higher in some fundamental crops like pepper, 100%, and tomato, 85%. In all, some 26600 hectares of protected horticulture use these techniques, when in 2006 they were only used in about 129.

The Regional Ministry of Agriculture and Fisheries of the Andalusian Government is launching a plan (Compromiso Verde or Green Commitment) in 2016 to expand the area to 100%. For the Regional Government, this is the model that should extend the distances with traditional crops and leave a definitive patent that Almeria produces with more quality, more traceability and more food security than any:

...guarantees the quality and improves the positioning of our products in international markets, increases the profitability of farms, enhances respect for the environment and minimizes the presence of insect vectors of viruses and favors the correct management of pests." (Carmen Ortiz Rivas, Minister of Agriculture, Fisheries and Rural Development.)

Analysis of horticultural products indicate that only 0,6% of samples show pesticide residues, when the European average is 2,8% (five times more).

=== Hydroponics ===
Some greenhouses are beginning to use computer-controlled hydroponics systems, using rock wool for rooting.

== Aerial photographs and coordinates ==
- Centre of Campo de Dalías - Google maps Dense concentration of plastic greenhouses
- 36.86°N 2.38°W Eastern outskirts of Almería
- 36.91°N 2.15°W Níjar valley
- 36.70°N 3.44°W Carchuna
- 36.74°N 3.365°W Valley north of Castell de Ferro

== See also ==
- Prostitution in Roquetas de Mar
- Roquetas Pidgin Spanish – Dialect spoken by immigrants in Southern Spain
- Albedo

== Bibliography ==
- Vázquez de Parga, Raúl. "Campo de Dalías, milagroso oasis de Almería" (Field of Dalías, miraculous oasis of Almería), Selecciones del Reader's Digest, tome LXXXIV, nº 504, November 1982, D.L.: M. 724-1958
- Several authors. "Atlas Geográfico de la Provincia de Almería. El medio – La sociedad – Las actividades" (Geographic Atlas of the Province of Almería. The medium - The society - The activities), Ed. Instituto de Estudios Almerienses, Diputación de Almería, D.L. AL 818–2009, ISBN 978-84-8108-437-5
