= Dalías =

Dalías, Spain
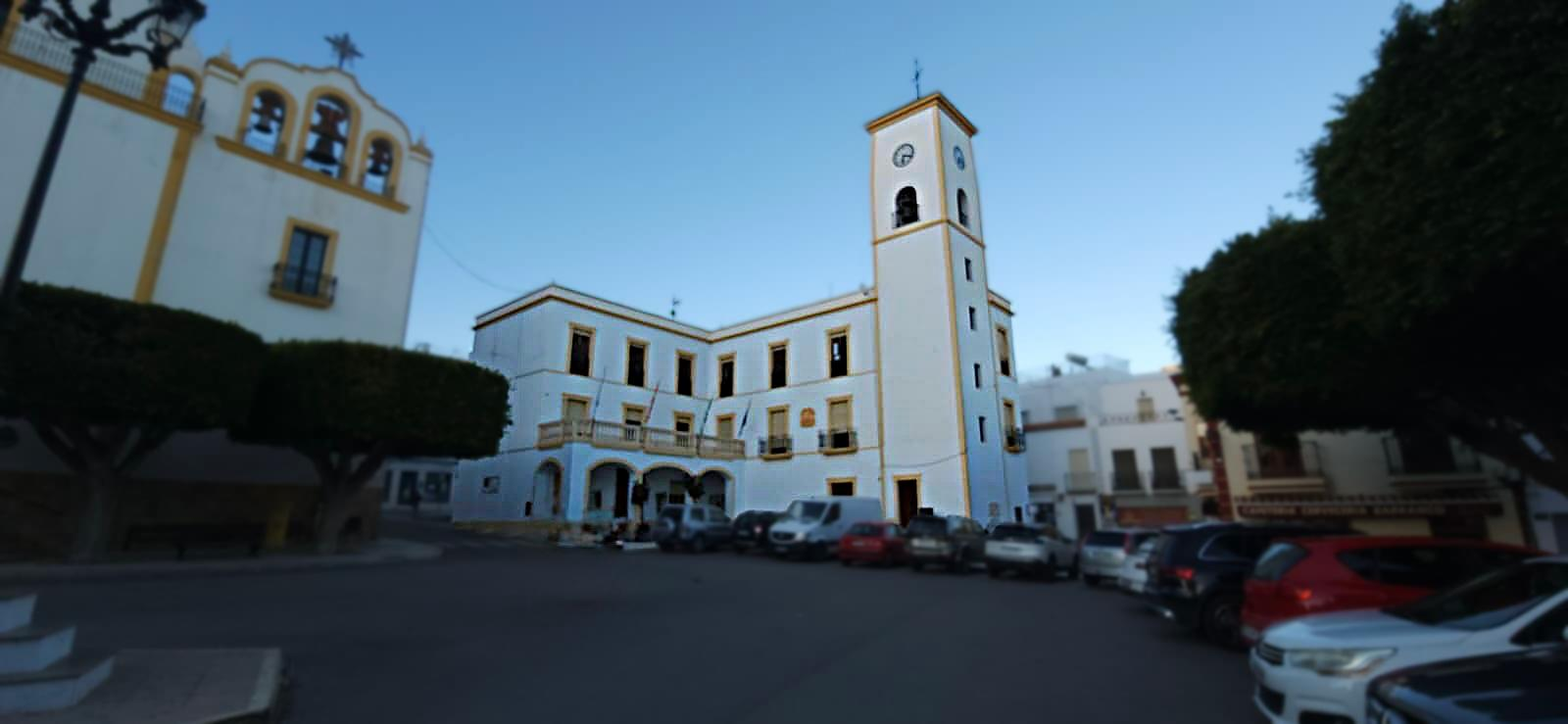
- Town hall

- Flag Coat of arms

- Location of Dalías Dalías (Andalusia) Dalías (Spain)
- Coordinates: 36°49′17″N 2°52′13″W
- Country: Spain
- Community: Andalusia
- Province: Almería
- Comarca: Poniente Almeriense
- Municipality: Dalías

Government
  - Mayor (2022-): Francisco Trinidad Lirola Martín (PP)

Area
  - Total: 140 km^{2} (54 sq mi)
- Elevation: 411 m (1,348 ft)

Population (2025-01-01)
  - Total: 4,196
  - Density: 30/km^{2} (78/sq mi)
- Time zone: UTC+1 (CET)
  - Summer (DST): UTC+2 (CEST)

Dalías is a municipality of Almería province, in the autonomous community of Andalusia, Spain.

== Demographics ==
Historical population
| Year | Pop. | ±% |
|---|---|---|
| 1999 | 3,663 | — |
| 2000 | 3,634 | −0.8% |
| 2001 | 3,679 | +1.2% |
| 2002 | 3,680 | +0.0% |
| 2003 | 3,660 | −0.5% |
| 2004 | 3,675 | +0.4% |
| 2005 | 3,773 | +2.7% |
| 2018 | 4,031 | +6.8% |
Source: INE (Spain)

== See also ==
- List of municipalities in Almería
