= Enix, Spain =

Municipality in Andalusia, Spain

Enix
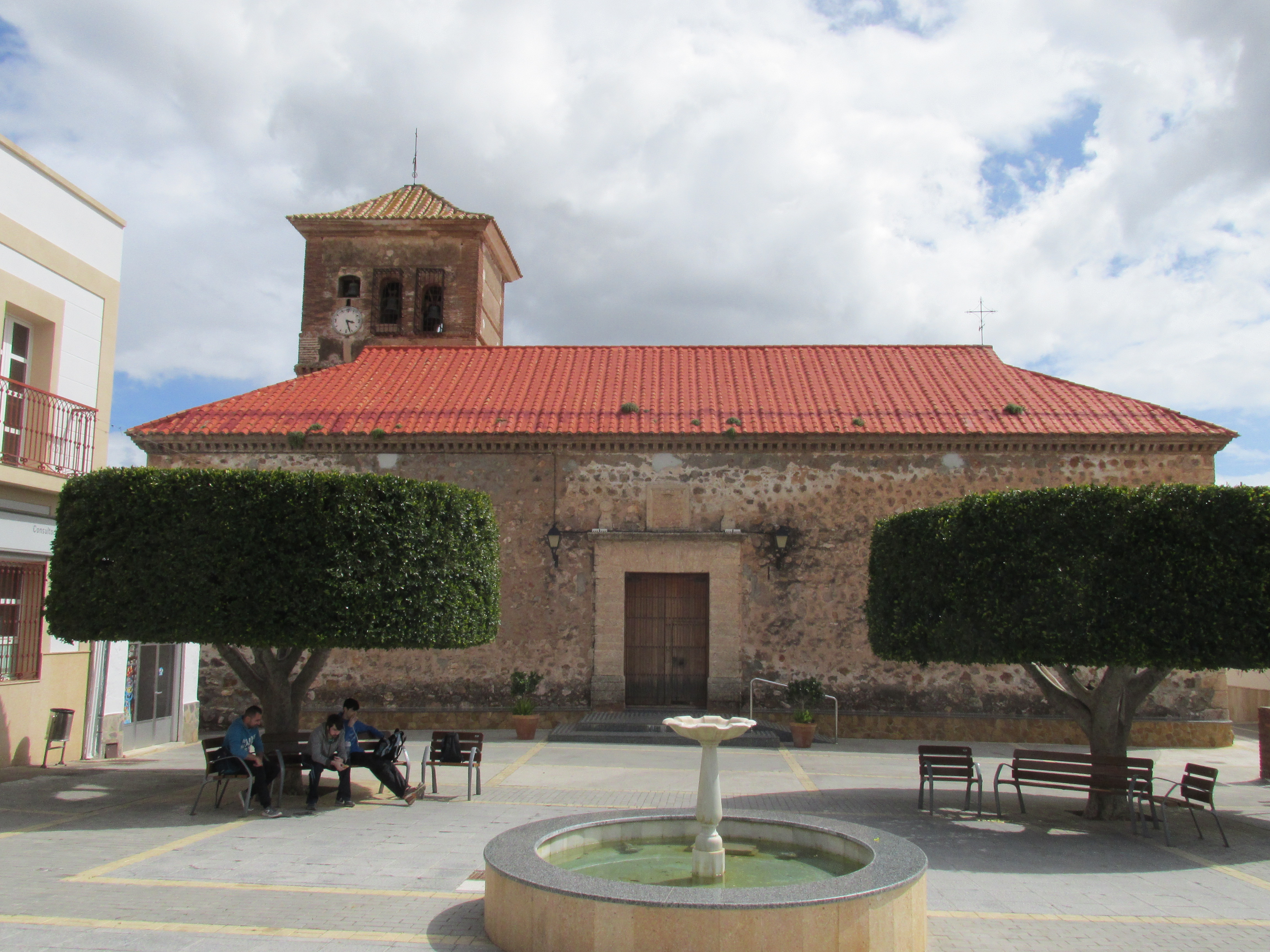

- Flag Coat of arms

- Location Enix (Andalusia) Enix (Spain)
- Coordinates: 36°52′37″N 2°36′07″W
- Country: Spain
- Community: Andalusia
- Province: Almería
- Comarca: Poniente Almeriense
- Municipality: Enix

Government
  - Mayor (2015- ): Álvaro Izquierdo Álvarez (PPA)

Area
  - Total: 67 km^{2} (26 sq mi)
- Elevation: 723 m (2,372 ft)

Population (2025-01-01)
  - Total: 612
  - Density: 9.1/km^{2} (24/sq mi)
- Time zone: UTC+1 (CET)
  - Summer (DST): UTC+2 (CEST)
- Website: enix.es

Enix is a municipality of Almería province, in the autonomous community of Andalusia, Spain.

== Demographics ==
Historical population

Year	Pop.	±%
1842	1,100	—
1877	1,683	+53.0%
1887	1,719	+2.1%
1897	1,692	−1.6%
1900	1,733	+2.4%
1910	1,876	+8.3%

Year	Pop.	±%
1920	1,884	+0.4%
1930	1,140	−39.5%
1940	948	−16.8%
1950	845	−10.9%
1960	684	−19.1%
1970	500	−26.9%

Year	Pop.	±%
1981	268	−46.4%
1991	241	−10.1%
2001	261	+8.3%
2011	426	+63.2%
2017	434	+1.9%

- 1842–2011: Population according to Instituto Nacional de Estadística
- 2017: Population according to the register of inhabitants

== Notable people ==
- Agustín Gómez-Arcos was born in 1933 in Enix and died on March 20, 1998, in Paris.

== See also ==
- List of municipalities in Almería
