= List of Bienes de Interés Cultural in the Province of Almería =

This is a list of Cultural Heritage landmarks in the Province of Almería, Spain.

== A ==
- Álbum de estampas inglesas con el ex-libris de María Cristina, Reina de España
- Alcazaba of Almería
- Aljibe Bermejo
- Almería Cathedral
- El Argar y La Gerundia
- Arte rupestre del arco mediterráneo de la Península Ibérica en Almería

== B ==
- Baños de la Reina (Celín)
- Basílica de Nuestra Señora de las Mercedes (Oria)
- Benizalón

== C ==
- Cable Inglés
- Casa Fuerte de la Cruceta
- Castillo de Guardias Viejas
- Castillo de las Escobetas
- Castillo de Huebro
- Castillo de San Cristóbal (Almería)
- Castillo de Santa Ana
- Castillo de Tabernas
- Castillo de Vélez-Blanco
- Catedral de la Encarnación de Almería
- Centro histórico de Almería
- Cerro del Nacimiento
- El Cerrón (Dalías)
- Ciavieja
- Círculo Mercantil e Industrial (Almería)
- Convento de los Agustinos
- Cortijo Nuevo
- Yacimientos arqueológicos del Cerro del Espíritu Santo
- Zona arqueológica del Cerro del Mojón
- Zona arqueológica de El Chuche (Benahadux)

== E ==
- Epitolario de Felipe IV
- Estación de Almería

== F ==
- Yacimiento arqueológico de Fuente Álamo (Cuevas del Almanzora)
- Fundición de Santo Tomás (Almería)

== G ==
- Gérgal

== H ==
- Hospital de Santa María Magdalena
- Huécija

== I ==
- Iglesia de Nuestra Señora de la Encarnación (Vera)
- Iglesia de San Benito (Vícar)
- Iglesia de Santa María (Tíjola)

== L ==
- Yacimiento arqueológico de La Ribera de la Algaida
- Loma de Galera
- Los Millares
- Lugarcico Viejo (Antas)

== M ==
- Mausoleo romano de Abla
- Despoblado de Los Millares

== N ==
- Necrópolis megalítica de Gádor

== P ==
- El Peñón de las Juntas
- El Peñón de la Reina (Alboloduy)
- Las Pilas-Mojácar la Vieja

== S ==
- Santuario del Saliente (Albox)

== T ==
- Terque
- Torre de Cerrillos
- Torre de Cárdenas
- Torre de la Garrofa (Almería)
- Torre de Macenas
- Torre del Perdigal (Almería)
- Torre García
- Torres de vigilancia costera
- Torreón de San Miguel (Almería)

== Y ==
- Yacimiento arqueológico El Villar
