= Calar Alto =

Mountain peak in Andalusia, Spain

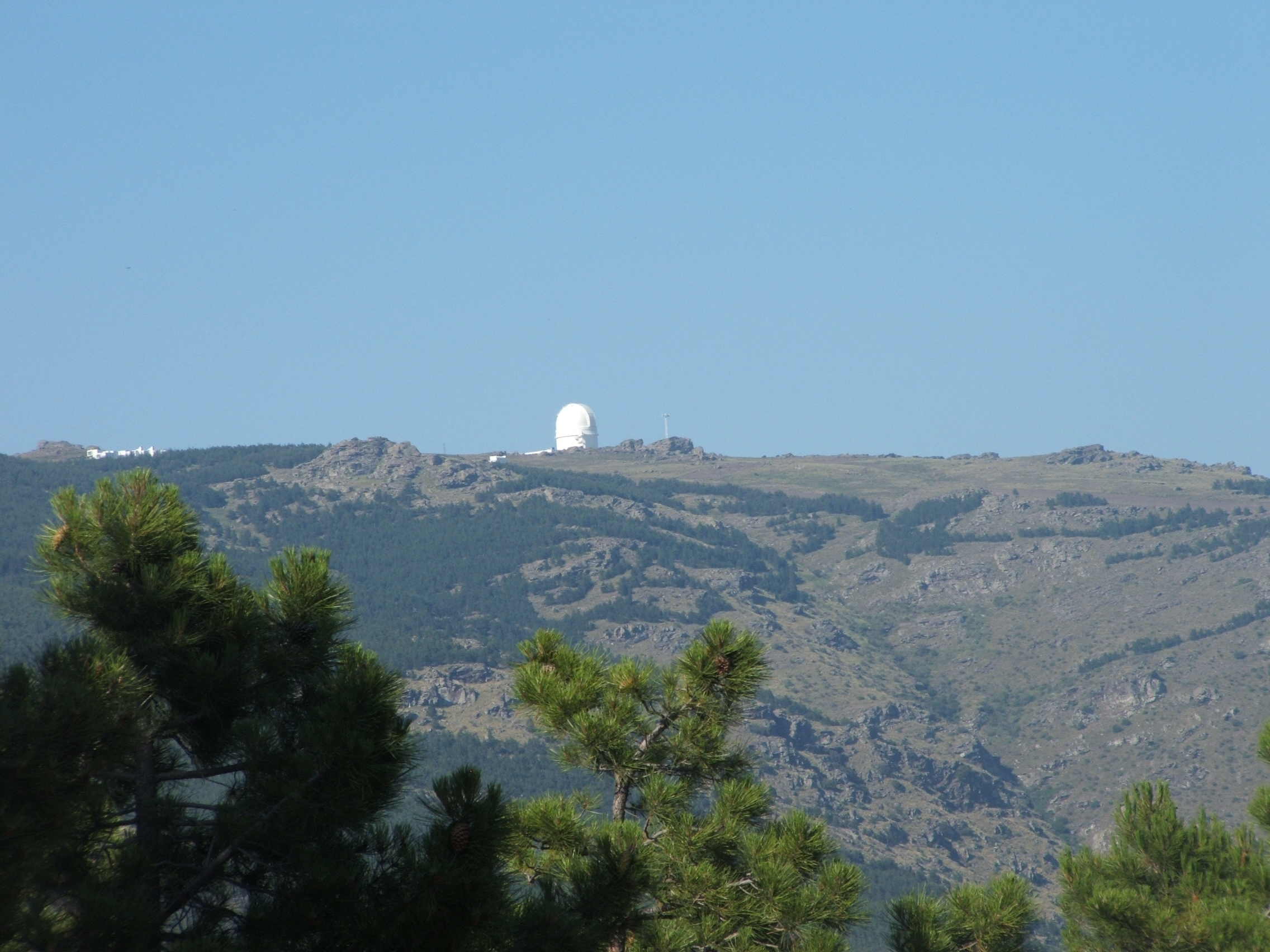
- View of the Calar Alto Observatory

Highest point
- Elevation: 2,168 m (7,113 ft)
- Prominence: 399 m (1,309 ft)
- Coordinates: 37°13′25″N 02°32′46″W

Geography
- Location within Spain
- Location: Almería Province, Spain
- Parent range: Sierra de Los Filabres

Geology
- Mountain type: Schist

Climbing
- Easiest route: From Gérgal

Calar Alto is the highest peak (2168 m over sea level) in the Sierra de Los Filabres, a mountain subrange of the Sierra Nevada in Andalusia, Spain. It is also the highest peak in the said mountain subrange.

It hosts the Calar Alto astronomical observatory, which benefits from two aspects of the climate in the region: the dry atmosphere reduces the restrictions that atmospheric water vapor adds to the transmission characteristics of seeing through the atmosphere (see also the article Tabernas Desert), and the low number of cloudy nights adds nicely to the efficiency of observations through the year.

== See also ==
- Calar Alto Observatory
