= Almería murders =

1981 trial for murder in Andalusia, Spain

Court case about the Almería murders
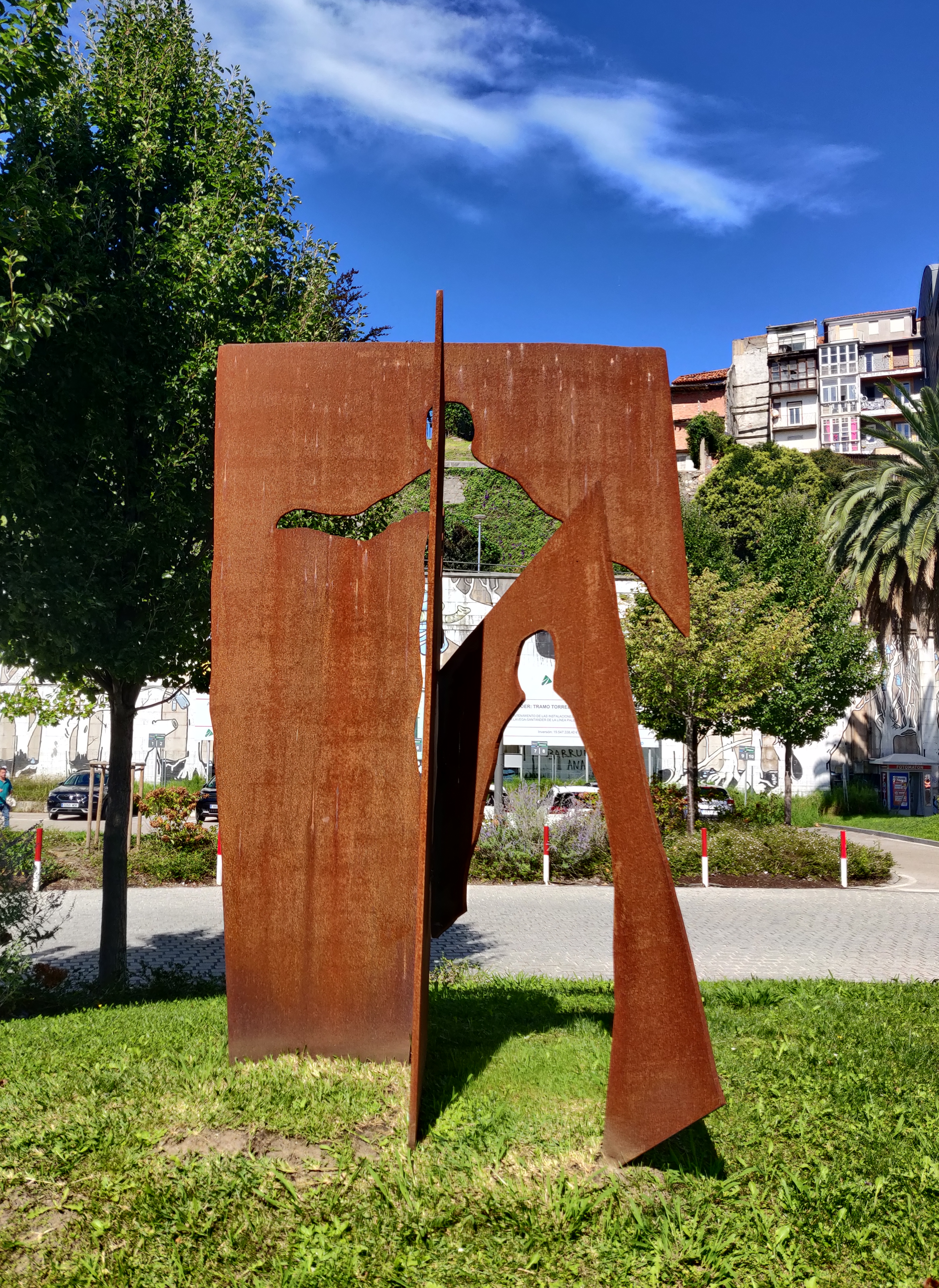
- Monument erected in remembrance of the victims
- Court: Audiencia Provincial de Almería
- Decided: 28 July 1982

Keywords
- Homicide

The Almería murders were a series of murders and tortures of three young men in Roquetas de Mar (Almería) on 10 May 1981. They led to a trial of various members of the Spanish Civil Guard for their various crimes, known popularly as the Almería Case.

== Background ==
In the early 1980s, Spanish democracy was far from being consolidated. The failed coup d'état attempt on 23 February 1981 made evident the discontent which existed among some high-ranking military officials about the economic and political crisis that the country was suffering, as well as the numerous attacks by ETA against members of the army, National Police Corps and Civil Guard.

On 7 May 1981, ETA attacked Lieutenant General Joaquín de Valenzuela in Madrid, who, at that moment, was the chief of the Military Chamber of the Royal House of Juan Carlos I. The attack was carried out using the so-called "Algerian technique": on a motorcycle the two attackers followed the Army's Dodge Dart in which the Lt. General was travelling. When the vehicle stopped for a traffic light, near 5 Conde de Peñalver Street, the attackers situated themselves side by side with the car, and the motorcycle's passenger situated a bag on top of the car, which exploded shortly after, when the attackers were already fleeing the scene.

As a result of the explosión, Lieutenant Coronel Guillermo Tevar Saco, a non-commissioned officer of the Royal Guard Antonio Nogueras García and the Royal Guard soldier who was driving, Manuel Rodríguez Taboada, died. Lt. General Valenzuela was seriously injured, but did not die (he would later die in 1996). Twenty bystanders were injured as well.

== Detention and crime ==
On 8 May 1981, three young men, residents of Santander (Cantabria), Luis Cobo Mier (aged 29), born in Santander and employee of Aceriasa in Nueva Montaña; Juan Mañas Morales (aged 24), born in Pechina (Almería) and destined to work in FEVE; and Luís Montero García (aged 33), born in La Fuente de San Esteban (Salamanca) and employee of Fyesa in Boo de Guarnizo, were travelling to Andalusia, to Mañas' hometown, to attend the first communion of his brother Francisco Javier. While in transit through Manzanares el Real (Community of Madrid), their car, property of Cobo, suffered a mechanical malfunction, so they took a train to Alcázar de San Juan (Ciudad Real) to then head to Puertollano (Ciudad Real), where they rented another car, a green Ford Fiesta, to reach their destination. It is speculated that the rental car company owner had a strange feeling about the hurry the three travellers had, and he communicated his suspicion to the Civil Guard in the case it could be that they had committed the attack in Madrid days before and whose facial composite appeared in press and TV.

On 9 May, they arrived at their destination, and the next day, they continued towards Roquetas de Mar (Almería) to visit another of Mañas' brothers. There, they were detained at gunpoint by the Civil Guard with the intention of transporting them to the command headquarters in Almería. The following day, their dead bodies, completely burnt and with multiple gunshot wounds, appeared, inside the Ford Fiesta, near Gérgal.

The official version, sustained by the Civil Guard, indicated that the Civil Guards were traveling to Madrid with their own vehicle, and that, near the kilometer point 8.350 of the road to Gérgal, the three men assaulted the Guard's vehicle driver, who jumped out, as well as his passenger. The head of the Guards, Lieutenant Coronel Carlos Castillo Quero, who was behind, in another car, ordered all of them to stop and shoot at the Ford Fiesta, which fell down the side of the road, catching fire, with nothing the eleven guards present could do.

== The trial ==
The trial for the death of the three men started on 14 June 1982 in the Audiencia Provincial de Almería. The prosecutor described the incident as constitutive of a homicide and asked for Lt. Coronel Carlos Castillo Quero to be condemned to 42 years in prison, and 27 years for the other two people accused.

The sentence which put an end to the case was dictated in July 1982. It was proven that Lt. Col. Castillo and his men tortured until death the three detained in an abandoned encampment named Casafuerte and that, afterwards, in an attempt to destroy evidence, threw their vehicle down an embankment, shot it multiple times, and set it on fire.

Lieutenant Coronel of the Civil Guard Carlos Castillo Quero was sentenced to twenty-four years in prison, on three counts of homicide, returning to probation on 20 July 1992. Lieutenant Manuel Gómez Torres and guard Manuel Fernández Llamas were condemned for the same crimes to fifteen and twelve years respectively with the extenuating circumstance of due obedience. At the same time, the sentence obliged the condemned to pay four million pesetas as compensation to each of the victims' families.

Lt. Col. Castillo, in probation since 20 July 1992, died in Córdoba on 2 April 1994, after suffering from a heart attack at the age of 60.

== Homages to the victims ==
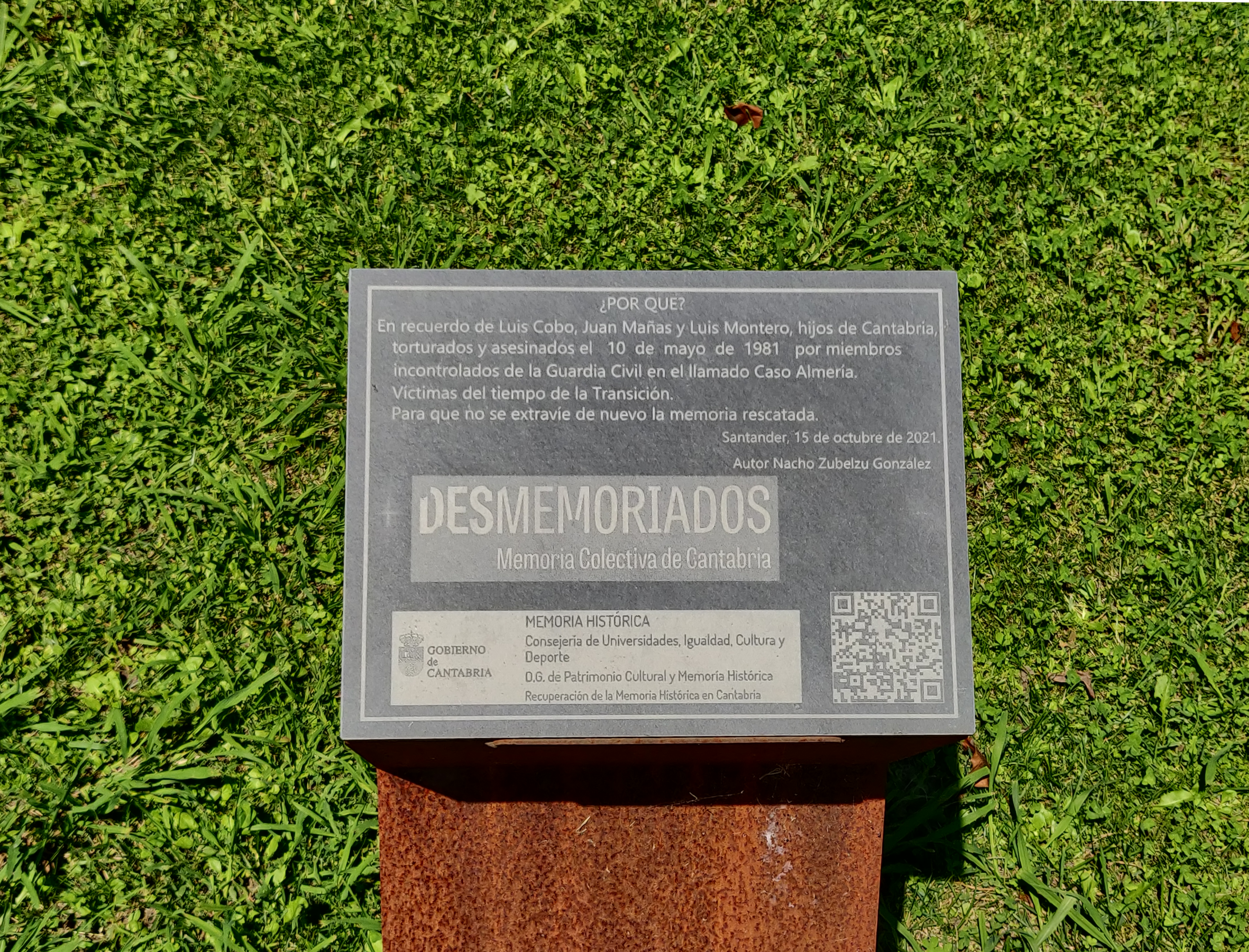
Plaque on the monument in remembrance of the victims of the Almería Case

From May 2021, on the occasion of the 40th anniversary of the events, a monolith remembers the incident in the point in the road in Gérgal (Almería) where the burnt wrecked car was found. In October of that same year, a monument was erected in Plaza de las Estaciones, Santander (Cantabria), city from where the three victims departed.

In 2023, the Government held a ceremony in remembrance with the victims' families in which it gave out compensation diplomas.
