= 1769 in Spain =

- Decades: 1740s; 1750s; 1760s; 1770s; 1780s
- See also: History of Spain; Timeline of Spanish history; List of years in Spain

Events in the year 1769 in Spain.

== Incumbents ==
- King: Charles III
- First Secretary of State - Jerónimo Grimaldi

== Events ==
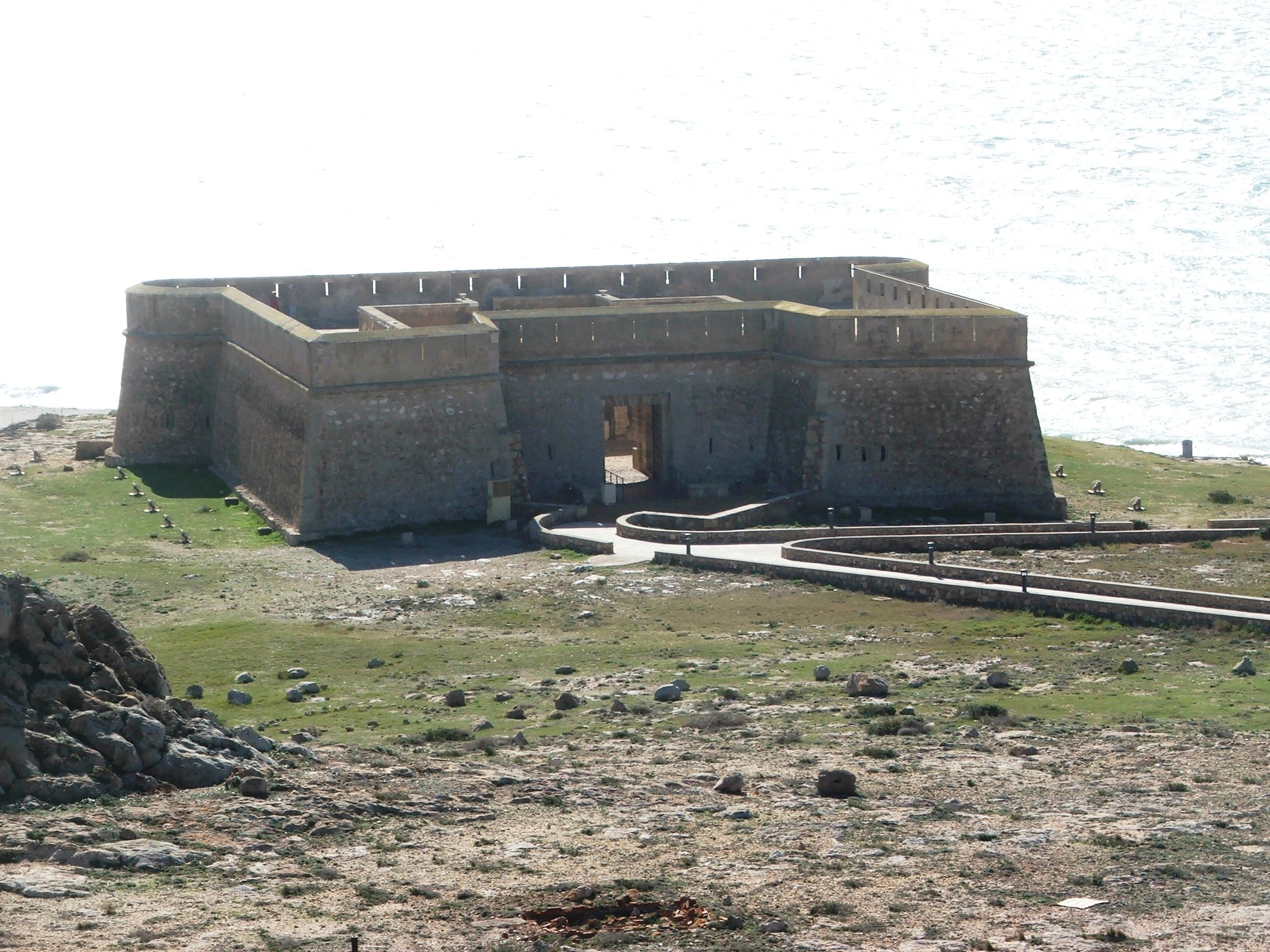
Castillo de Guardias Viejas

- Castillo de Guardias Viejas built in Almeria, Andalusia

== Births ==
- Enrique O'Donnell, Conde de La Bisbal, Spanish general of Irish descent (d. 1834)
