= Khashkhash Ibn Saeed Ibn Aswad =

Navigator of Al-Andalus

- Born: Pechina, Andalusia (modern-day Spain)
- Occupations: Navigator, Explorer, Writer
- Writing career
- Language: Arabic
- Period: 9th century
- Genre: Travel literature
- Notable work: Account of his voyages to the Atlantic Ocean

Khashkhash ibn Saeed ibn Aswad (Arabic: خَشْخَاش ٱبْن سَعِيد ٱبْن أَسْوَد, Khaškhāš ibn Saʿīd ibn ʾAswad; born in Pechina, Andalusia) was an Andalusian navigator.

According to Abbasid historian Abu al-Hasan Ali al-Mas'udi (871-957), Khashkhash Ibn Saeed Ibn Aswad sailed over the Atlantic Ocean and discovered a previously unknown land (Arḍ Majhūlah, أرض مجهولة). In his book The Meadows of Gold, al-Mas'udi writes that Khashkhash Ibn Saeed Ibn Aswad, from Delba (Palos de la Frontera) sailed into the Atlantic Ocean in 889 and returned with a shipload of valuable treasures.

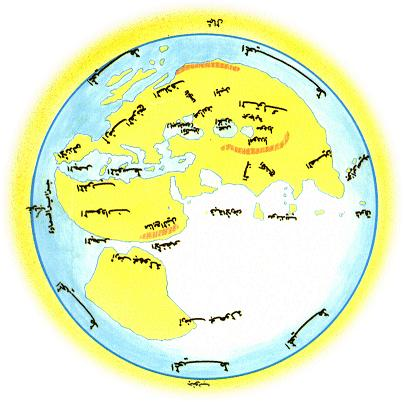
Al-Mas'udi's atlas of the world (reversed on the North–South axis) also includes a continent west of the Old World

Ali al-Masudi, in his historical account The Meadows of Gold (947 CE), wrote:

In the ocean of fogs (the Atlantic) there are many curiosities which we have mentioned in detail in our Akhbar az-Zaman (News of our Era), on the basis of what we saw there, adventurers who penetrated it on the risk of their life, some returning safely, others perishing in the attempt. Thus a certain inhabitant of Cordoba, Khashkhash by name, assembled a group of young men, his co-citizens, and went on a voyage on this ocean. After a long time he returned with booty. Every Spaniard knows this story.

The same passage, in Aloys Sprenger's 1841 English translation, is interpreted by some authors to imply that Ali al-Masudi regarded the story of Khoshkhash to be a fanciful tale:

Some people consider this sea as the origin of all others. There are some wonderful stories related respecting it, for which we refer the reader to our book the Akhbár ez-zemán; there he will find an account of those crews who have risked their lives in navigating this sea, and who of them have escaped, and who have been shipwrecked, also what they have encountered and seen. Such an adventurer was a Moor of Spain, of the name of Khoshkhash. He was a young man of Cordoba: having assembled some young men they went on board a vessel which they had ready on the ocean, and nobody knew for a long time what had become of them. At length they came back loaded with rich booty. Their history is well known among the people of al-Andalus.

== See also ==
- Pre-Columbian trans-oceanic contact

== Bibliography ==
- Abul Hasan Ali Al-Masu'di (Masoudi) (ca. 895?-957 CE), The Book of Golden Meadows, c. 940 CE
