= 1770 in Spain =

- Decades: 1750s; 1760s; 1770s; 1780s; 1790s
- See also: History of Spain; Timeline of Spanish history; List of years in Spain

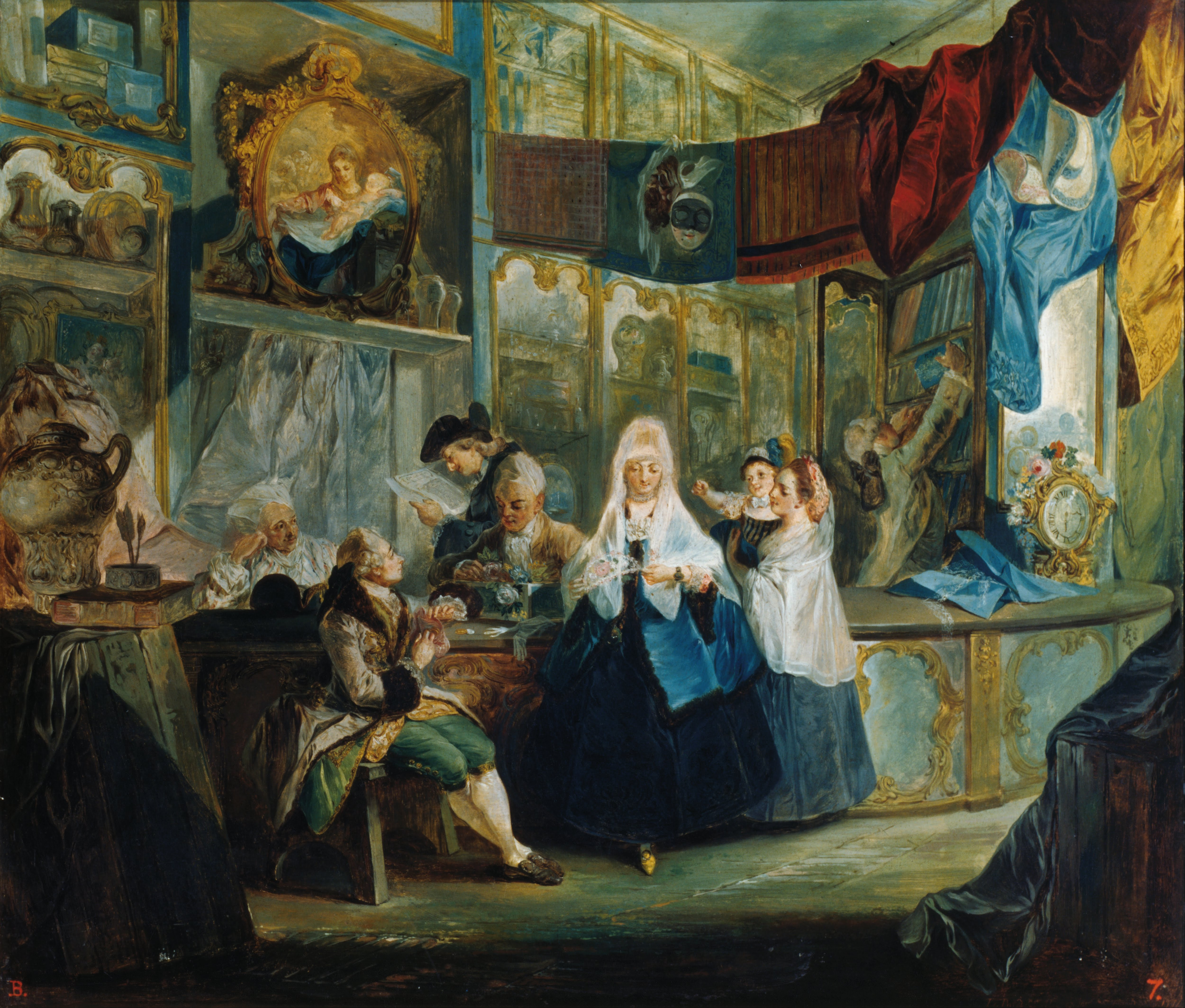
Luis Paret y Alcázar - The Shop - Google Art Project

Events from the year 1770 in Spain.

== Incumbents ==
- Monarch – Charles III
- First Secretary of State - Jerónimo Grimaldi

== Events ==
- Zoo Aquarium de Madrid

== Deaths ==
- Diego de Torres Villaroel a Spanish writer, poet and professor.
- Nicolas de Carvajal a Spanish nobleman and Military figure.
- José de Escandón a Spanish colonial leader and the founder of Nuevo Santander.
