= Pechina =

Municipality in Andalusia, Spain

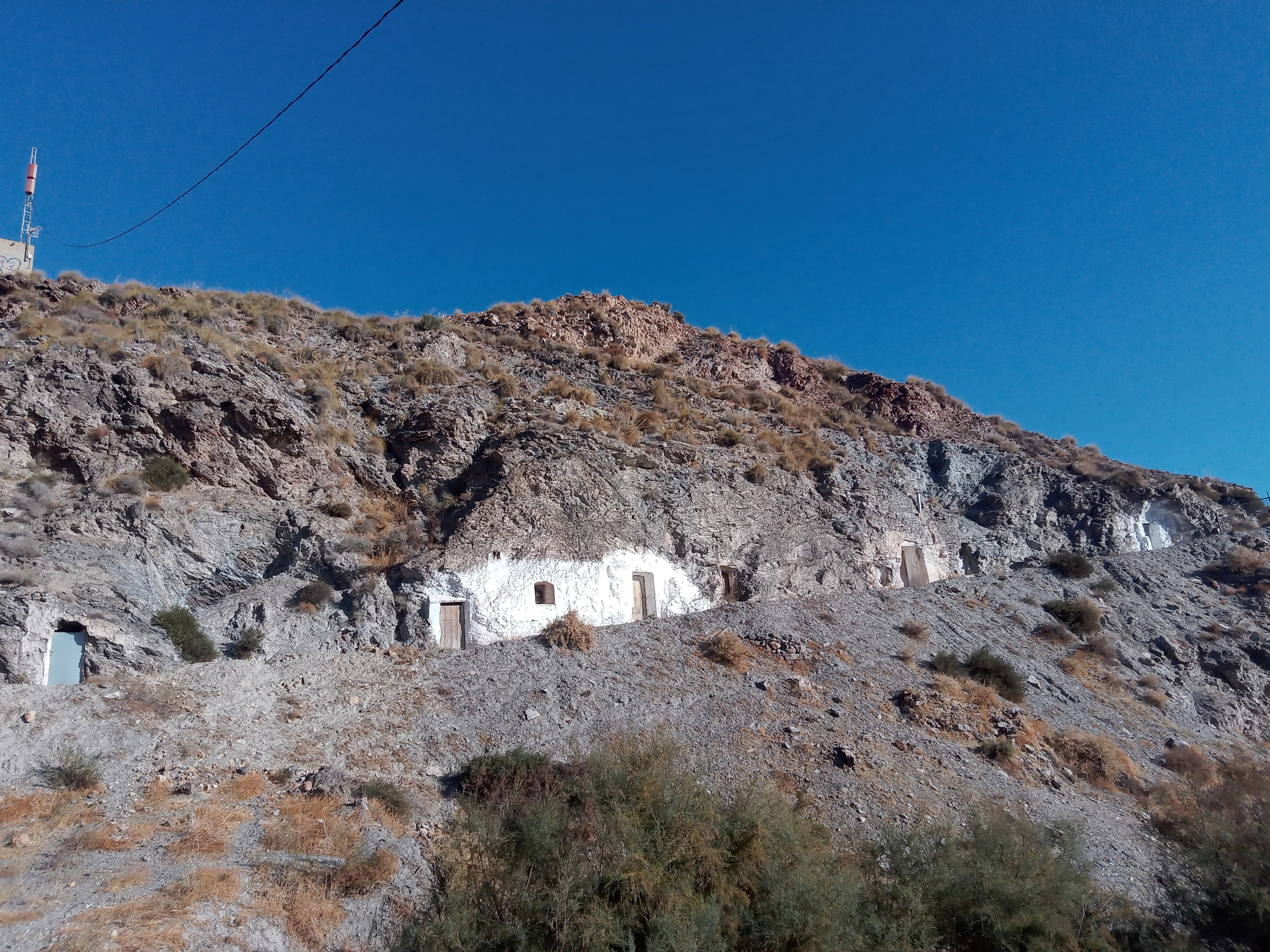
- Cave houses in Sierra Alhamilla, Pechina

- Flag Coat of arms

- Location within Andalusia Location within Spain
- Coordinates: 36°54′59″N 2°26′25″W
- Country: Spain
- Community: Andalusia
- Municipality: Almería

Government
  - Mayor: José Manuel Moreno Díaz (PSOE)

Area
  - Total: 46 km^{2} (18 sq mi)
- Elevation: 98 m (322 ft)

Population (2025-01-01)
  - Total: 4,552
  - Density: 99/km^{2} (260/sq mi)
- Time zone: UTC+1 (CET)
  - Summer (DST): UTC+2 (CEST)
- Climate: BWk

Pechina is a municipality of the Province of Almería, in the autonomous community of Andalusia, Spain. It is on the site of the ancient town of Urci.

Pechina, called Bajjāna in Arabic, was the centre of a Yemeni colony during the period of the Umayyad caliphate in Spain. Founded before 886, the self-governing colony was known as the ursh al-Yaman. Jews also shared in the prosperity of Pechina. In 922 it was incorporated into the caliphate. It oversaw a ribat (fortress) and maintained its own navy that could be put use for piracy or official Umayyad campaigns. Between 939 and 944 it took part in four expeditions against the Franks, Idrisids and Fatimids. By 955, it had been eclipsed by Almería.

== Demographics ==
Historical population
Year	Pop.	±%
1999	2,689	—
2000	2,763	+2.8%
2001	2,836	+2.6%
2002	2,910	+2.6%
2003	3,024	+3.9%
2004	3,114	+3.0%
2005	3,307	+6.2%
Source: INE (Spain)

== Notable people ==
- Khashkhash Ibn Saeed
- Juan Mañas Morales, murdered by Civil Guard officers in Almería Case

== See also ==
- List of municipalities in Almería
