= Mojácar la Vieja =

Archeological site in Almería, Spain

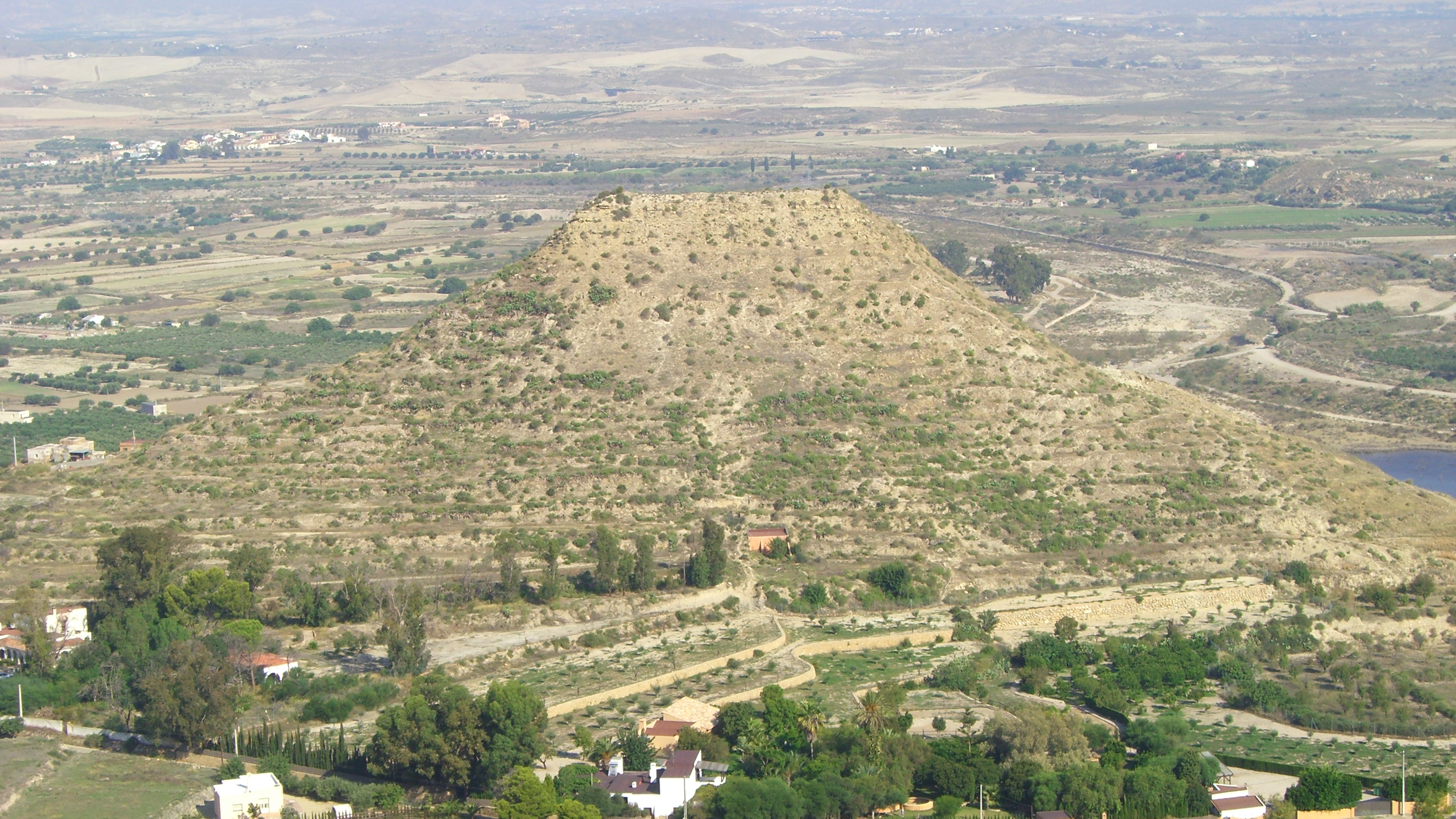
- Interactive map of Mojácar la Vieja
- 37°08′50″N 1°51′49″W

Mojácar la Vieja is an archaeological site located in Mojácar, Almería which was declared Bien de Interés Cultural.

The first archaeological fieldwork started in 2018 by Universidad de Granada, and it was discovered some structures dated in XII and XIII century. Previously in 1990 it was discovered a necropolis with the same dates.

It has been carrying out archaeological works until today.
