= Convento de los Agustinos =

Buildings in Andalusia, Spain

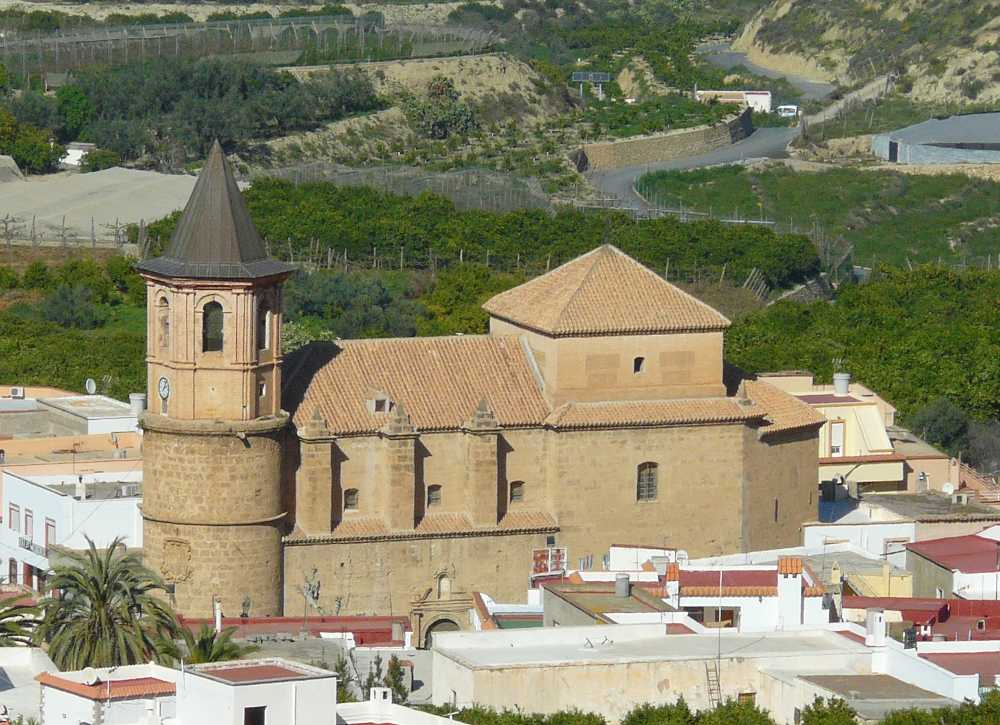
- Interactive map of Convento de los Agustinos
- Location: Huécija, Almeria, Spain
- Coordinates: 36°58′5″N 2°36′31″W
- Beginning date: 16th century
- Completion date: 1729

The Augustinian convent (Spanish: Convento de los Agustinos) is one of the most important landmarks of Huécija municipality in the province of Almería in Andalusia, Spain. It consists of a baroque church and some remains of the Augustinian monastery which it formerly served.

== History ==
The monastery was established in the 16th century with the aim of reaching out to the local morisco population. The church sustained damage in an earthquake in 1522 and an arson attack in 1568 during the Rebellion of the Alpujarras. It was rebuilt in the 18th century.

The monastery was closed in the 19th century as part of the desamortizacion, while the church remained in active use.
