= Casa Fuerte de la Cruceta =

Castle and fortress in Andalusia, Spain

Coordinates: 36.8364°N 2.3270°W

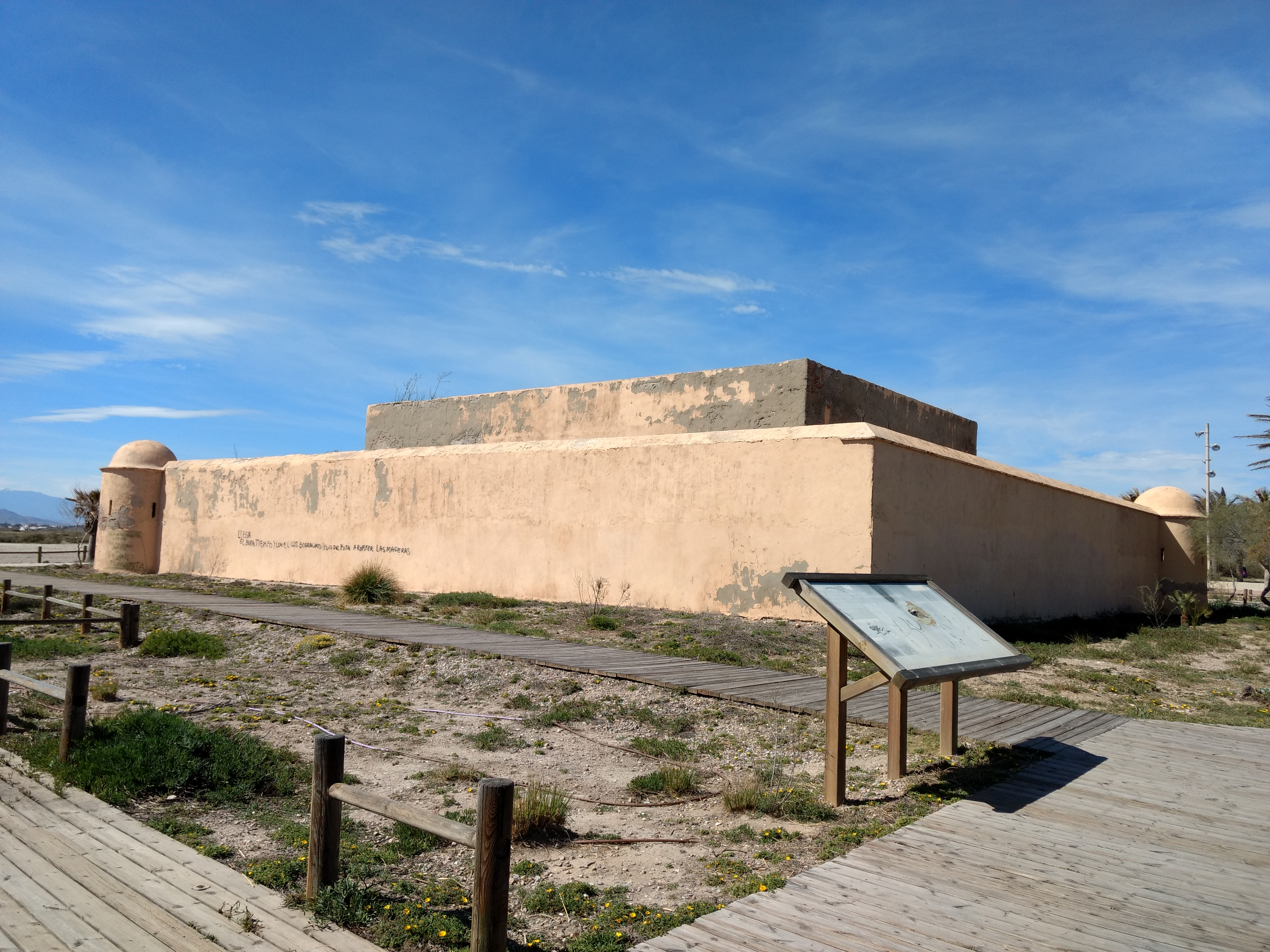

The Casa Fuerte de la Cruceta or the Casas Fuertes is a privately owned castle and coastal defense fortress in Almería, Province of Almería, Andalusia, Spain.

== History ==
The Casa Fuerte de la Cruceta was finished in 1773 for the purpose of housing cavalry units. The fortress was one of the westernmost defensive positions built in the 18th century by King Charles III of Spain to defend the area of Almería and the Cabo de Gata. It was originally intended to house soldiers who were tasked with guarding the areas between Torre García and Perdigal. The King approved plans for its construction in 1771 and works were completed in 1773. In 1778 the fort had a permanent garrison of 14 soldiers.

By 1830, the fort was abandoned by the army but in 1857, it was transferred to the control of the Carabineros. In 1941, the fort was garrisoned by the Guardia Civil.

The fortress was restored in 2005 and is accessible as a part of the waterfront of El Toyo.

== Bibliography ==
- GIL ALBARRACÍN, A. Almería: las defensas exteriores. Barcelona 2006, p 61 y ss
- Almería conserva siete fortalezas que hacían frente a los ataques piratas, artículo aparecido en El Almería.es el 31 de agosto de 2008.
- Las defensas costeras de Andalucía - Arquitectura y defensa de la costa oriental andaluza: un itinerario cultural, Boletín del Instituto Andaluz de Patrimonio Histórico, nº 40–41, en el sitio Web de la Consejería de Cultura de la Junta de Andalucía.
