= Castillo de las Escobetas =

Castle in Garrucha, Andalusia, Spain

Coordinates: 37.1725°N 1.823611°W

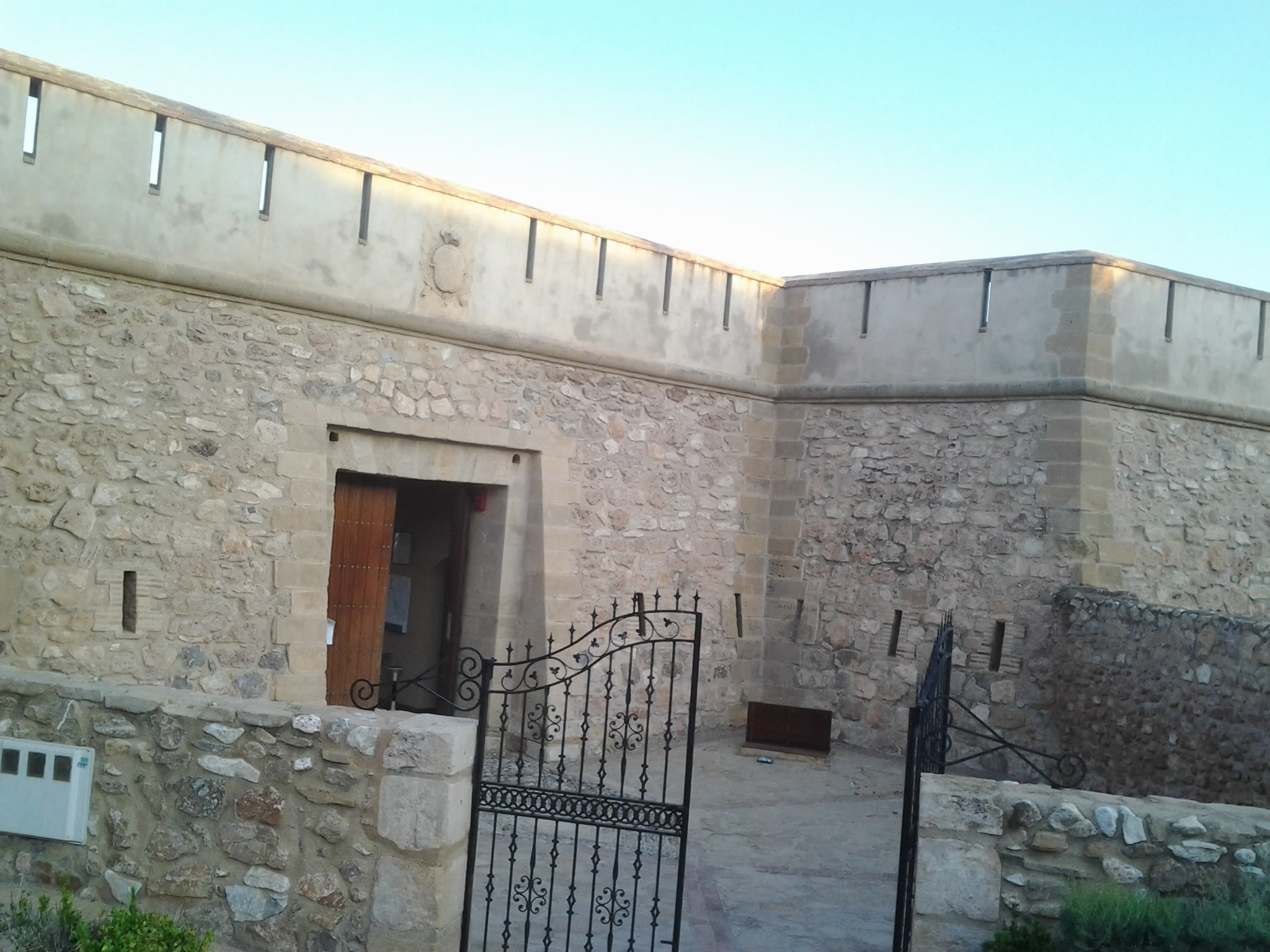
Castillo de las Escobetas

Castillo de las Escobetas ("Castle of the Nazarene") is located 3.25 miles (5.23 km) northward of Cantal Point, in the town of Garrucha, Almería province, in the autonomous community of Andalusia, Spain. The fishing village of Garrucha suffered at the hands of Berber pirates until the year 1766 when barracks were built at Escobetas, a provisional military building which cost 13,970 reais. In 1769, the castle was completed at a cost of 181,000 reais. The fort was designed by the architect Francisco Ruiz Garrido. After its construction, Garrucha began to grow. It is of masonry construction in three section. The central portion is rectangular with rounded short sides. Attached to the right lateral side, there is a truncated pyramid shape with sloping walls. In its upper part, a parapet is pierced with loopholes. The main body is attached to the left side, of lower height, without openings. It is accessed by an external staircase and one tranche that attaches to the right side. In 1963, the Ministry of Culture declared the site a Bien de Interés Cultural monument.
