= Huécija =

Huécija, Spain
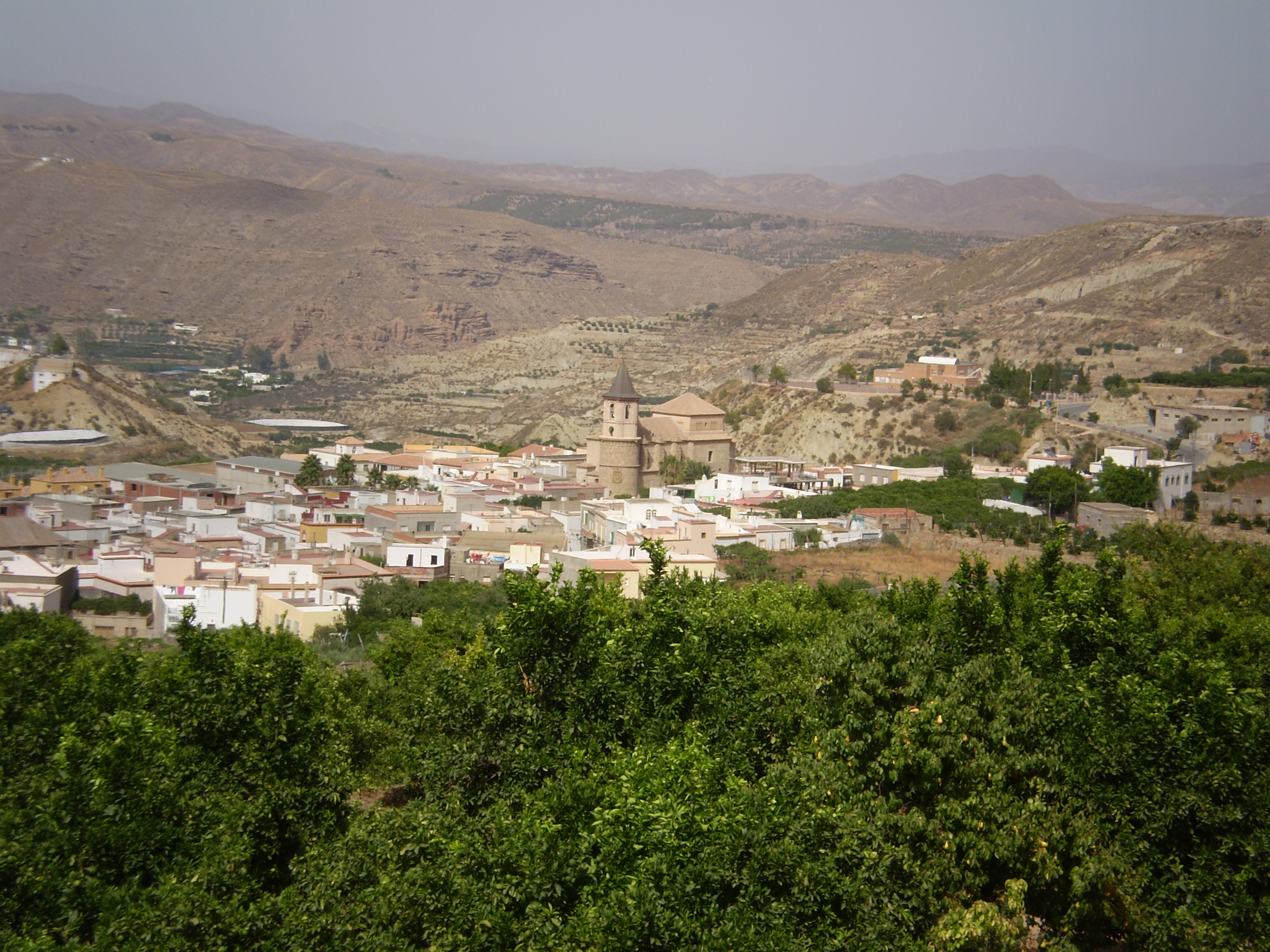

- Flag Coat of arms

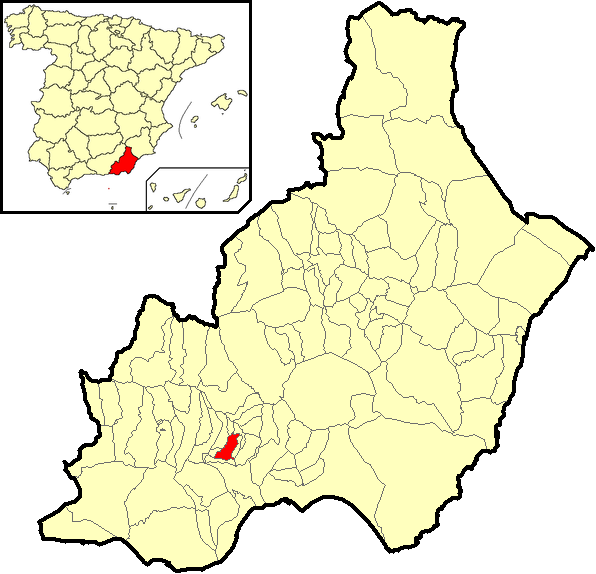
- Location
- Coordinates: 36°58′N 2°36′W
- Country: Spain
- Autonomous Community: Andalusia
- Province: Almería

Government
  - Mayor: Juan José Ramírez Andrés(PSOE)

Area
  - Total: 19 km^{2} (7.3 sq mi)
- Elevation: 410 m (1,350 ft)

Population (2025-01-01)
  - Total: 526
  - Density: 28/km^{2} (72/sq mi)
- Time zone: UTC+1 (CET)
  - Summer (DST): UTC+2 (CEST)
- Postal code: 04409
- Area code: 34 (Spain) + 950 (Almería)
- Website: huecija.com

Huécija is a municipality of Almería province, in the autonomous community of Andalusia, Spain.

It has two churches, one of which the Convento de los Agustinos, is notable as an example of baroque architecture.

== Demographics ==
Historical population
Year	Pop.	±%
1999	531	—
2000	558	+5.1%
2001	551	−1.3%
2002	560	+1.6%
2003	551	−1.6%
2004	551	+0.0%
2005	539	−2.2%
Source: INE (Spain)

== See also ==
- List of municipalities in Almería
