= Castillo de Guardias Viejas =

Castle in El Ejido, Andalusia, Spain

Coordinates: 36.700278°N 2.851389°W

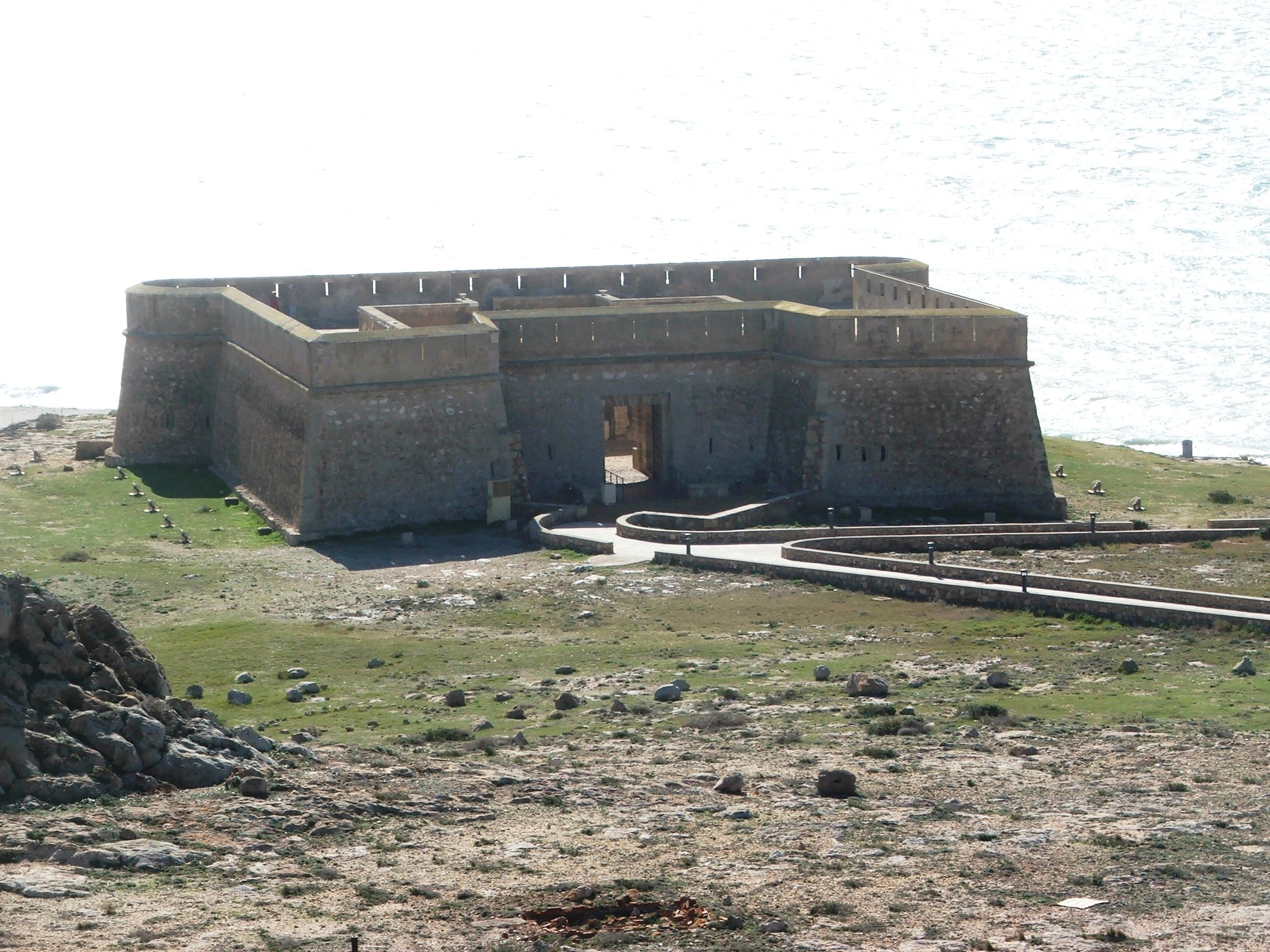
Castillo de Guardias Viejas

Castillo de Guardias Viejas is a castle located in the town of Los Baños de Guardias Viejas, within the municipality of El Ejido, Almería province, in the autonomous community of Andalusia, Spain. It is a battery built in 1769, near the rocky surface low rise of the Mediterranean Sea. Owned by the Regional Government of Andalusia, the municipality has carried out renovation work in the building, which houses a permanent exhibition of clothes and weapons of the Napoleonic era. It was restored in 1980. In 1985, it was declared a Bien de Interés Cultural monument. The castle is one of five forts in the town, next to the Moorish Tower Hill, the Square Tower, Tower of the Netherlands and the Tower of Balerma. It has been a venue for musical events such as the Natural Music Festival and the festival Creamfields Andalucía.
