= Gérgal =

Gérgal, Spain
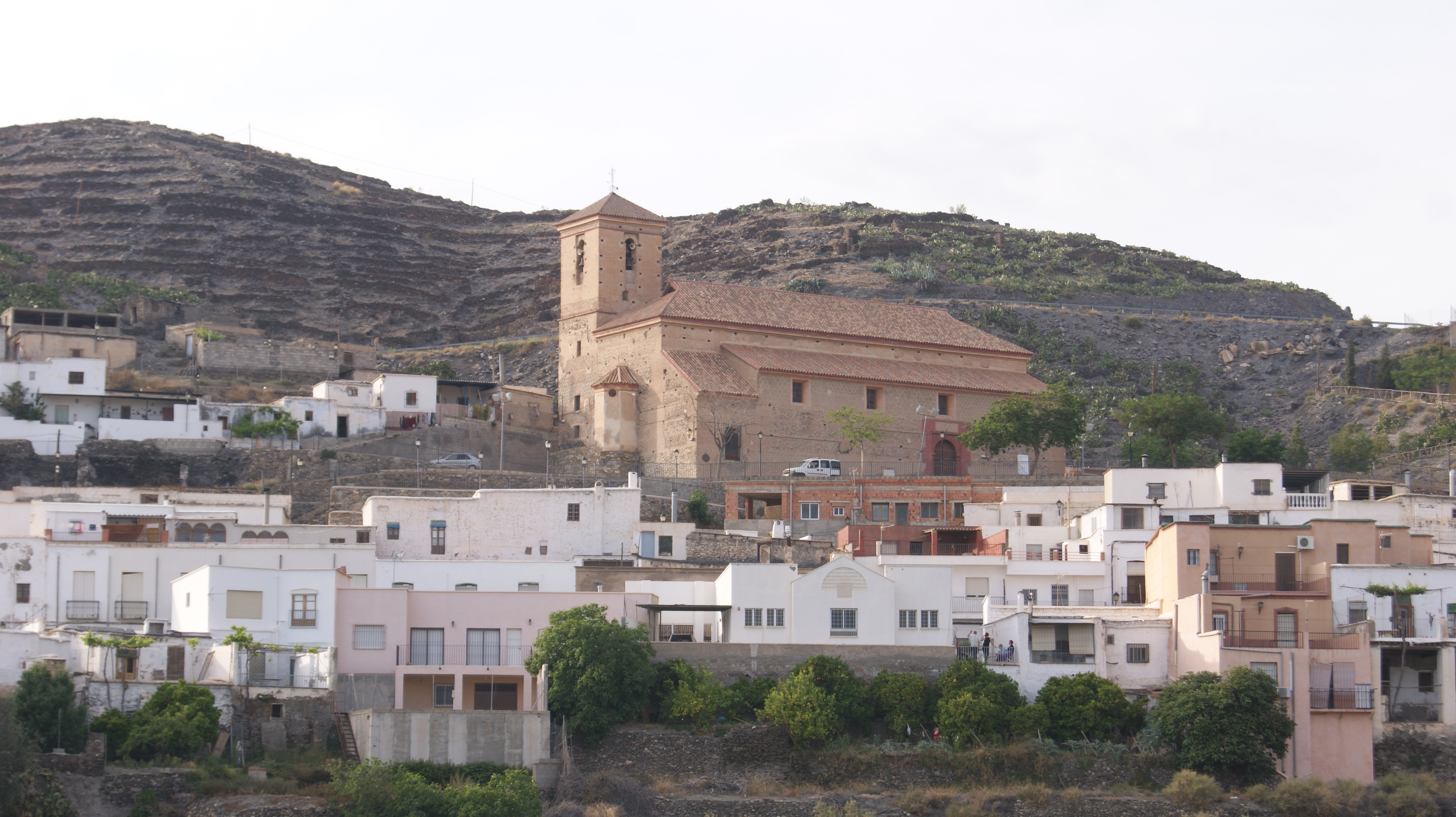

- Coat of arms
- Interactive map of Gérgal, Spain
- Coordinates: 37.118565°N 2.539563°W
- Country: Spain
- Community: Andalusia
- Municipality: Almería

Government
  - Mayor: Leonor María Membrive Gómez (PSOE)

Area
  - Total: 228 km^{2} (88 sq mi)
- Elevation: 758 m (2,487 ft)

Population (2025-01-01)
  - Total: 1,211
  - Density: 5.31/km^{2} (13.8/sq mi)
- Time zone: UTC+1 (CET)
  - Summer (DST): UTC+2 (CEST)

Gérgal is a municipality of Almería province, in the autonomous community of Andalusia, Spain.

The town is located at the foot of the southern side of the Sierra de Los Filabres.

== Demographics ==
Historical population
Year	Pop.	±%
1999	1,067	—
2000	1,059	−0.7%
2001	1,050	−0.8%
2002	1,029	−2.0%
2003	1,062	+3.2%
2004	1,068	+0.6%
2005	1,057	−1.0%

== See also ==
- List of municipalities in Almería
